= After the Fire discography =

- Studio albums: 5
- Live albums: 1
- Compilation albums: 3
- Singles: 15
- Video albums: 1

This is the discography of British rock band After the Fire.

== Albums ==
=== Studio albums ===
Title	Album details	Peak chart positions
Title	Album details	UK
Signs of Change	Released: April 1978; Label: Rapid; Formats: LP	—
Laser Love	Released: 21 September 1979; Label: CBS; Formats: LP, MC	57
80-f	Released: 24 October 1980; Label: Epic; Formats: LP, MC	69
Batteries Not Included	Released: 19 March 1982; Label: CBS; Formats: LP, MC	82
AT2F	Released: November 2006; Label: Angel Air; Formats: CD; Recorded in 1982, yet had remained unreleased	—
"—" denotes releases that did not chart or were not released in that territory.

=== Live albums ===
Title	Album details
Live at Greenbelt…Plus	Released: March 2006; Label: Angel Air; Formats: CD

=== Compilation albums ===
Title	Album details	Peak chart positions	
Title	Album details	CAN	US
Der Kommissar	Released: August 1982; Label: CBS; Formats: LP, MC; Released first in North America as ATF with a slightly rearranged track listing	28	25
Der Kommissar – The CBS Recordings	Released: 31 January 2005; Label: Edsel; Formats: 2xCD	—	—
Radio Sessions 1979–1981	Released: June 2009; Label: Angel Air; Formats: CD	—	—
"—" denotes releases that did not chart or were not released in that territory.

=== Video albums ===
Title	Album details
Live at Greenbelt	Released: September 2005; Label: Angel Air; Formats: DVD

== Singles ==
Title	Year	Peak chart positions									Album
Title	Year	UK	AUS	CAN	GER	NZ	SA	SWE	US	US Main	Album
"One Rule for You"	1979	40	—	—	—	—	—	—	—	—	Laser Love
"Laser Love"	1979	62	—	—	—	—	—	—	—	—	Laser Love
"Life in the City"	1979	—	—	—	—	—	—	—	—	—	Laser Love
"Love Will Always Make You Cry"	1980	—	—	—	—	—	—	—	—	—	80-f
"Wild West Show"	1980	—	—	—	—	—	—	—	—	—	80-f
"80-F" (Europe-only release)	1981	—	—	—	—	—	—	—	—	—	80-f
"Dancing in the Shadows"	1981	—	—	—	—	—	—	—	—	—	Batteries Not Included
"Frozen Rivers"	1981	—	—	—	—	—	—	—	—	—	Batteries Not Included
"Rich Boys"	1982	—	—	—	—	—	—	—	—	—	Batteries Not Included
"Der Kommissar"	1982	47	17	12	61	13	2	20	5	4	Der Kommissar
"Sternenflug" (Netherlands-only release)	1982	—	—	—	—	—	—	—	—	—	Non-album single
"Dancing in the Shadows" (re-recording)	1983	147	—	—	—	—	—	—	85	—	Der Kommissar
"8-Ball in the Top Pocket" (withdrawn and subsequently released as a solo single by Andy Piercy)	1983	—	—	—	—	—	—	—	—	—	Non-album singles
"One Rule (For Trade Justice)"	2005	—	—	—	—	—	—	—	—	—	Non-album singles
"Back to the Light" (Japan promo-only release)	2012	—	—	—	—	—	—	—	—	—	Signs of Change
"—" denotes releases that did not chart or were not released in that territory.
