= Every Lover's Sign =

Single by The Lover Speaks

from the album The Lover Speaks
- B-side: "Every Lover's Sign (Dub Mix Edit)"
- Released: October 1986 (UK); November 1986 (US); January 1987 (Australia)
- Genre: Pop
- Length: 4:07
- Label: A&M Records
- Songwriters: David Freeman, Joseph Hughes
- Producers: Jimmy Iovine, The Lover Speaks

The Lover Speaks singles chronology
"Tremble Dancing" (1986)	"Every Lover's Sign" (1986)	"I Close My Eyes and Count to Ten" (1987)

"Every Lover's Sign" is a song by British duo the Lover Speaks, released in 1986 as the third single from their self-titled debut album. It was written by David Freeman and Joseph Hughes, and produced by Jimmy Iovine and the Lover Speaks.

== Background ==
David Freeman and Joseph Hughes formed the Lover Speaks in 1985, having previously worked together in the punk outfit the Flys. After signing to A&M Records in early 1986, the band recorded their self-titled debut album with Jimmy Iovine. The lead single, "No More "I Love You's"", was released in July that year and peaked at No. 58 in the UK. In August, the album was released, but failed to chart, as did a second single, "Tremble Dancing" when released in September.

In October, "Every Lover's Sign" was released as the album's third single (and second in America). For its release as a single, Bruce Forest and Andy Wallace were hired to remix the song. Together, at Sigma Sound Studios in New York, they created a 7" remix, along with an extended version (known as "New Extended Mix" or "New York Mix") and a "Dub Mix", both designed for club play. The "Dub Mix" was edited by The Latin Rascals (Albert Cabrera and Tony Moran) and additional keyboards provided by David Coles. Although it failed to chart in the UK, the song became a club hit in America, reaching No. 6 on the Billboard Dance Club Songs and remaining on the chart for nine weeks. Attempts to capitalise on the club success of the song, A&M tried to generate airplay to break the song onto the Billboard Hot 100, but they were unsuccessful. It was the duo's only chart entry in the States.

As with each track on The Lover Speaks album, "Every Lover's Sign" is a reference to a concept in Roland Barthes' book A Lover's Discourse: Fragments (Fragments d'un discours amoureux). In the liner notes of the 2015 re-issue of the album, Freeman revealed of the track's lyrics: "Lyrically, "Every Lover's Sign" is a simple concept. Every single sign that any lover makes ever at any time in history has already been made before. Nothing is new. The whole language of love is there before we are born. The idea of that song is that everything I could do to prove I love you outwardly is coming from a pop parade that has existed before we were born." The song is Hughes' favourite from the album. Recalling the demo version the duo produced prior to the album, he said: "The original demo had an aura we couldn't quite capture, but it didn't matter as the album version was great."

== Release ==
"Every Lover's Sign" was released by A&M Records on 7" and 12" vinyl in the UK, Germany, America and Canada. In January 1987, it was given a release in Australia too. The B-Side on all releases was the "Dub Mix" version of the song, except in the UK, where a "Dub Mix (Edit)" version was included. For the 12" vinyl, the extended version of the song was featured, known as "New Extended Mix" in the States and "New York Mix" elsewhere. The North American versions of the single featured a different picture sleeve to the one released in the UK and Germany.

In 2015, to coincide with the Cherry Pop re-issue of The Lover Speaks album, DJ Paul Goodyear reconstructed the "Dub Remix" of the song, which was named the "SanFranDisko Expanded Edition Re-Rub". It was given away as a free download, through Classic Pop, to those who purchased the re-issue.

== Critical reception ==
Upon release, Billboard listed the song under the "Recommended" section of the "Pop" category. They described the song as "new romantic-type British technopop". In another issue of Billboard, Brian Chin spoke of the song: "Level 42's "World Machine" smashes Janet Jackson's record for most-delayed single release; the cut was playing off the album a year ago. But the Shep Pettibone remix is excellent and worthwhile; certainly, the single should be a pop priority... same is true of the Lover Speaks' "Every Lover's Sign", which is already charting dance. Especially as remixed by Bruce Forest, this is the kind of material that the Thompson Twins are desperately in need of..." In December 1986, the song was voted best new song of the week ("Screamer of the Week") by listeners of WLIR 92.7 FM.

In a contemporary review of the album, Terry Atkinson of Los Angeles Times said: "Though its ultra-romantic, stylishly emotional approach sometimes leads to Tears for Fears/Wham! mush, this new English duo bows with a frequently intriguing album. Unusual arrangements interweave a male voice with Freeman's female-like background vocals, enhancing the best tracks here - big-boom ballads "No More 'I Love You's'," "Still Faking This Art of Love," "Every Lover's Sign" and the impressionistic "Of Tears.""

In a retrospective review of the album, Michael Sutton of AllMusic commented: ""Every Lover's Sign" and "Never to Forget You" offer respite from all the melancholy confessions; however, it's the stinging ache in tracks such as "Face Me and Smile," a tale of infidelity, that linger after the album has finished spinning." Imran Khan of PopMatters said: "...other numbers, like "Every Lover's Sign", evince the sunny and clean jubilance of America's West Coast beaches. Singer David Freeman has a powerfully commanding baritone which he accents with a slightly overwrought, Jacobean flourish, infusing these ringing pop tunes with a sense of Olympian grandeur."

In 2013, Ira Israel of The Huffington Post included the song in his blog article "10 Amazing Pop Songs & Ballads You May Have Missed". He said: "I know I'm going to take alot [sic] of flak on this one. It's so terribly dated, I know. But try to look past the electronic drums to hear the backing vocals over the chorus. I would put this up against Jimmy Iovine's other hit from that era anytime: Stevie Nicks' 'Stand Back'."

== Track listings ==
7" single (UK release)

1. "Every Lover's Sign" - 4:07
2. "Every Lover's Sign" (dub mix edit) - 5:19

7" single (US release)

1. "Every Lover's Sign" (remix) - 4:07
2. "Every Lover's Sign" (dub mix) - 6:37

7" single (US promo)

1. "Every Lover's Sign" (remix) - 4:07
2. "Every Lover's Sign" (remix) - 4:07

12" single (UK/German release)

1. "Every Lover's Sign" (New York mix) - 5:57
2. "Every Lover's Sign" (dub mix) - 6:37

12" single (US release)

1. "Every Lover's Sign" (new extended mix) - 5:57
2. "Every Lover's Sign" (dub mix) - 6:37

== Chart performance ==
Chart (1984)	Peak position
U.S. Billboard Dance Music/Club Play Singles	6

== Personnel ==
- David E.D. Freeman – vocals, producer, arranger
- Joseph Hughes – producer, arranger
- Barry Gilbert – keyboards
- Jimmy Iovine – producer
- June Miles-Kingston, Alex Brown, Lynn Davis – backing vocals
- Fred Defaye – engineer
- Marc O'Donoghue – assistant engineer
- Joe Chiccarelli – mixing, recording
- Craig Engel – mix assistant
- Joe Borja, Robert de la Garza – recording
- Holly Warburton - photography (US sleeve)
- Mike Owen - photography (UK/European sleeve)
- John Warwicker - art direction, design
