= Your Love (Nicki Minaj song) =

2010 song by Nicki Minaj

- Updated artwork

Single by Nicki Minaj

from the album Pink Friday
- Released: June 1, 2010
- Studio: Glenwood Place Studios (Burbank, CA)
- Genre: Hip-hop; R&B
- Length: 4:04
- Label: Young Money; Cash Money; Universal Motown
- Songwriters: Onika Maraj; Pop Wansel; David Freeman; Joseph Hughes
- Producer: Pop & Oak

Nicki Minaj singles chronology
"Woohoo" (2010)	"Your Love" (2010)	"Bottoms Up" (2010)

Music video
- "Your Love" on YouTube

"Your Love" is a song by rapper Nicki Minaj from her debut studio album, Pink Friday (2010). It was released on June 1, 2010 by Young Money, Cash Money, and Universal Motown as the lead single from the album. Written in 2008 by Minaj and producer Pop Wansel, featuring a sample of Annie Lennox's 1995 cover of "No More "I Love You's"", the song was an unmastered demo not intended to be released. The demo was leaked in early 2010 and gained a significant amount of listeners, charting on Billboard.

A rap-singing ballad, "Your Love" is a different style compared to Minaj's previously released work, and features a hip hop backbeat alongside finger snaps and xylophone sounds. After its official release, it peaked at number 14 on the US Billboard Hot 100 and number four on the Hot R&B/Hip-Hop Songs chart. A remix featuring British singer Jay Sean was released on August 2, 2010. In March 2011, the song was certified platinum by the Recording Industry Association of America.

== Composition and release ==
"Your Love"
A sample of "Your Love", which samples Annie Lennox's "No More I Love You's"

"Your Love" is a ballad with rap and singing, driven by a hip hop backbeat and featuring finger snaps and xylophone sounds. It samples Annie Lennox's 1995 cover version of "No More "I Love You's"" by the Lover Speaks. According to the sheet music published at Musicnotes.com by Sony/ATV Music Publishing, the song is set in common time with a metronome of 94 beats per minute. It is composed in the key of E major with Minaj's vocal range spanning from the low-note of B_{3} to the high-note of C♯_{5}.

"Your Love" was created after a series of accidents; producer Pop Wansel made the beat in his mother's basement. A fan of Lennox, his sister suggested sampling "No More I Love You's". Despite his disdain for the song, after hearing his sister playing the song he looped a sample in his basement, adding a kick and snap. While sending Minaj some beats over email, Pop accidentally attached the track. He texted her saying it was an accident, but she liked the vibe and wrote her verses for it. After recording a demo with his beat, the song went in limbo for two years until an anonymous hacker at Hot Beats Studio in Atlanta leaked it online. Pop said Minaj was horrified as she disliked how she sounded in the recording and the AutoTune, and she was concerned about the public's reception of her singing on it. They both thought the leak would be forgotten, however its profile grew, rising in listeners and surpassing Minaj's current single "Massive Attack". An unmastered demo, the leak entered the Billboard charts. Lenox did not clear the sample, so Pop and his producing partner Oak replayed the sample, sent Minaj a new beat and she re-recorded it. According to AOL, the first version of "Your Love" appeared on Minaj's unofficial mixtape Barbie World from January 2010, with different lyrics in the pre-chorus and a faster tempo.

Minaj's label released the song on June 1, 2010, six months after the leak. Pop said that Minaj's management did not want the song released, but the public loved it. In an interview with Hot 93.7, Minaj spoke about the leak of the song, saying "That was a leak and I was so upset they put it out 'cause I recorded that song like two years ago. Next thing you know, people started falling in love with it." While on the set of its music video, Minaj further explained:

"I was not planning on putting the song out at all. But then I heard it one day, somebody told me it was online. And I was like, 'No way, no way in the world that song is out.' I went and listened to it and was really upset. It wasn't mixed, it wasn't finished, it wasn't anything — I wasn't gonna use it at all. But then radio started playing it."

Rap-Up posted a cover art of the single featuring a close up of Minaj smiling to her right, however that was not used by the artist. The song's cover art features a cartoon version of Minaj, made by illustrator Asia Kendrick-Horton who posted it for Minaj on Twitter.

The official remix, featuring labelmate Jay Sean, was also leaked on the internet on August 2, 2010, and later made available for purchase in Australia via iTunes.

== Critical reception ==
Lean Greenblatt of Entertainment Weekly wrote: "Rap's spitfire explores her softer side, sampling Annie Lennox on her honey-tongued ode to a good man." Rap-Up stated that Minaj "slows down her rapid-fire verses on the sticky and sweet [song] ... even exercises her vocal chops." Writing for Billboard, Mariel Concepcion commented on Minaj toning it down, stating that she "puts the sleazy talk aside and finds herself smitten with a young man... Minaj proves that even the wildest ones can be tamed."

Alexis Petridis of The Guardian highlighted Minaj's artistic fluidity, describing her sounding like "devoted girlfriend material" on the song. In Los Angeles Times, Margaret Wappler said that some of Minaj's lyrics seem as if she speaking to herself, deeming the song "just another fantasy clattering around the head of this Queens-bred imagineer of urban music whose sense of identity is so whimsically schizoid". Allison Stewart of The Washington Post called it a great song and "another example of Minaj trying on and ultimately discarding various personas". David Jeffries of AllMusic deemed the track an album highlight, adding that it "waltzes out of the speakers with a unique brand of hood majesty". In 2014, Pitchfork's Meaghan Garvey praised Minaj's writing, describing the song as a "metaphysical kind of love, the kind that makes you get all existential and start thinking about past lives".

== Chart performance ==
"Your Love" debuted on the US Billboard Hot 100 at No. 51, becoming Minaj's first song to chart on the Hot 100 as a solo artist. It eventually peaked at No. 14, becoming her first top 20 hit in the country. It debuted at No. 23 on the US Hot R&B/Hip-Hop Songs chart, and peaked at number four. "Your Love" peaked at No. 1 on the US Rap Songs chart for eight consecutive weeks. Minaj became the first female rapper to top the chart since Kanye West's "Good Life", featuring T-Pain. Minaj also became the first artist to lead the chart with a song without any features since Jadakiss in 2004 with "Why?". On the Canadian Hot 100, the song peaked at No. 43. "Your Love" also charted in the United Kingdom, at a peak of No. 71 on the UK Singles Chart and at No. 13 on the UK R&B Chart. The song peaked at number 32 on the Australian Urban Singles chart. "Your Love" made appearance in some few Europeans countries, such as Belgium and France, becoming her first entry on both. On March 30, 2011, the song was certified platinum by the Recording Industry Association of America (RIAA), denoting sales of over one million copies.

== Music video ==
Minaj is dressed in Japanese-styled fashions throughout the "Your Love" video.

The music video was directed by Director X on the weekend of July 4, 2010 in Los Angeles. Minaj asked fans on Twitter who they would like to see portray her love interest in the video. In an interview on the set of "Your Love", Minaj said, "We wanted to have geisha themes, samurai themes, stuff like that. I wanted to tell a love story. It's just kinda liking a guy, where he's not really for you to like—the forbidden fruit—and me and this other girl happen to like him and we go to war." The video premiered July 21, 2010 on MTV.com, and was posted on Minaj's Youtube channel on August 3, 2010.

The video depicts the story of a samurai-in-training, who falls in love with her master while a jealous peer fights for his affection, resulting in a duel. Actor Michael Jai White portrays Minaj's love interest. In some scenes, Minaj wears a blonde wig and black bodysuit and in front of a green flowing backdrop. According to MTV News, the scenes of the duel pay homage to Uma Thurman as The Bride and Lucy Liu as Cottonmouth in Kill Bill.

Robbie Daw of Idolator commended the video's plot twist, and believed that the fancy attire from the "No More I Love You's" video inspired Minaj's in the "Your Love" video. Nicole Sia of MTV Buzzworthy stated that the video resembles Crouching Tiger, Hidden Dragon in its fight scene and praised Minaj's look. Tray Hova of Vibe considered the best parts to be Minaj chopped through the blocks of cement, her crazy faces, silk sheets and headgear, and the worst part the "melodramatic ending" and "the return of those Freddy Krueger fingers".

== Remixes by other artists ==
Rapper Flo Rida released an unofficial remix to the song, in which he adds a verse. Jamaican recording artist Sean Paul also did a remix to the song, in which he contributed ad-libs throughout the song and added his own verse. Other remixes to the song include those done by Rick Ross, Chris Brown and Cuban Link.

== Personnel ==
Credits are taken from the Pink Friday liner notes.

- Vocals – Nicki Minaj
- Production – Pop Wansel, Oak Felder
- Recording/Mixing – Ariel Chobaz, assisted by Lyttleton "Cartwheel" Carter
- Mixing – Neal Pogue

== Charts and certifications ==
=== Weekly charts ===
Weekly chart performance for "Your Love"
Chart (2010)	Peak position
Australia Urban (ARIA)	32
Australian Hitseekers (ARIA)	9
Belgium (Ultratop 50 Wallonia)	26
Canada Hot 100 (Billboard)	43
Canada CHR/Top 40 (Billboard)	24
France (SNEP)	25
UK Singles (Official Charts)	71
UK Hip Hop/R&B (Official Charts)	13
US Billboard Hot 100	14
US Hot R&B/Hip-Hop Songs (Billboard)	4
US Hot Rap Songs (Billboard)	1
US Pop Airplay (Billboard)	22
US Rhythmic Airplay (Billboard)	5

=== Year-end charts ===
Year-end chart performance for "Your Love"
Chart (2010)	Position
US Billboard Hot 100	66
US Hot R&B/Hip-Hop Songs (Billboard)	26
US Rhythmic (Billboard)	24

=== Certifications ===
Certifications for "Your Love"
Region	Certification	Certified units/sales
Australia (ARIA)	Platinum	70,000^{‡}
New Zealand (RMNZ)	Platinum	30,000^{‡}
United Kingdom (BPI)	Silver	200,000^{‡}
United States (RIAA)	Platinum	1,200,000
^{‡} Sales+streaming figures based on certification alone.

== Release history ==
Release history and formats for "Your Love"
Region	Date	Format
United States	June 1, 2010	Digital download
United States	June 15, 2010	Mainstream airplay
United Kingdom	June 7, 2010	Digital download
Africa	June 6, 2015	Digital download
