= Der Kommissar =

Der Kommissar may refer to:

- "Der Kommissar" (song), the name of a 1981/1982 hit single by the Austrian musician Falco, covered in 1983 by the British act After the Fire
- Der Kommissar (album), an album by After the Fire
- Der Kommissar (German: "The Commissioner"), a term used in relation to law enforcement in Germany
- Der Kommissar - The CBS Recordings, a reissue of After the Fire's albums
- Der Kommissar (TV series), a German TV series
- Der Kommissar (fashion), lingerie line of Annelies Nuy
