= The Lover Speaks (album) =

Studio album by The Lover Speaks
- Released: August 1986
- Studios: A&M (Hollywood); The Church (London)
- Genres: Pop, new wave
- Length: 42:23
- Label: A&M
- Producers: Jimmy Iovine; The Lover Speaks

The Lover Speaks chronology
The Lover Speaks (1986)	The Big Lie (1987)

Singles from The Lover Speaks
- 1. "No More 'I Love You's'" Released: July 1986; 2. "Tremble Dancing" Released: September 1986; 3. "Every Lover's Sign" Released: October 1986; 4. "Never to Forget You (Australia only)" Released: June 1987

The Lover Speaks is the self-titled debut studio album from British duo the Lover Speaks, released by A&M in 1986.

== Background ==
David Freeman and Joseph Hughes formed The Lover Speaks in 1985, having previously worked together in the punk outfit The Flys. Deriving their name from the Roland Barthes' book A Lover's Discourse: Fragments, the duo began writing material and also recruited keyboard player Barry Gilbert after advertising for a keyboardist. Although Gilbert was not an official member of the group, he would record and tour with the duo. Later in 1985, the band sent a demo tape to Dave Stewart of Eurythmics and soon signed with Stewart's Anxious Music Publishing. Meanwhile, Stewart had forwarded the demo tape to Chrissie Hynde, who sent it to producer Jimmy Iovine. Iovine was successful in getting the band a recording contract with A&M Records in early 1986.

Work on the duo's debut album began in February 1986 at A&M Studios in Los Angeles. The Church Studios in London was also used for recording and Marcus Recording Studios was used to master the album. With Iovine as co-producer, the album took three months to complete. Originally, Freeman had put forward two possible titles for the album – The Politics of Roses and Seriously Purple Prose – but both were rejected by A&M in favour of being self-titled. Describing the album's theme, Freeman recalled in 2015:

"Each song on the album is a reference to a specific idea in Roland Barthes' book Fragments d'un discours amoureux. Our idea was to produce a musical cartoon of his book. The whole album is based on that book – an exercise in camp with a bouffant hairdo.

Hughes described the duo's concept to Record Mirror in 1986,

"We're just trying to look at love differently. A lot of people are very anti our stance, but we're very stubborn people so we'll persevere. There's a lot of misperception relating to the Lover Speaks. Basically though, we feel our music is very romantic. "

In July 1986, the band's debut single, "No More 'I Love You's'", peaked at No. 58 in the UK. In August, the debut album was released, but failed to chart. To promote the album, the band opened for Eurythmics during their Revenge World Tour. A second single from the album, "Tremble Dancing" was released in September, but also failed to chart. A third single, "Every Lover's Sign", was released in October in the UK and November in the US. In December, it reached at No. 6 on the US Billboard Dance Club Songs Chart.

In 1987, the duo followed the album with a cover of Dusty Springfield's "I Close My Eyes and Count to Ten", but the single failed to chart. In June 1987, "Never to Forget You" was released in Australia as a single, with "I Close My Eyes and Count to Ten" as the B-Side. During the same year, the band recorded their second album, The Big Lie, but A&M decided not to release it.

== Release ==
The album was released by A&M Records on vinyl, CD and cassette across the world including in the UK, Europe, US, Canada, Japan and Australia. In June 2015, The Lover Speaks was re-issued on CD by Cherry Pop with eight bonus tracks. The re-issue was produced by Vinny Vero and mastered by Andy Pearce. The liner notes were written by Larry R. Watts with artwork and design by Johan Mauritzson.

As of March, 2022, this critically acclaimed album is not available on iTunes.

== Critical reception ==
Professional ratings
Review scores
Source	Rating
AllMusic	4.5/5 stars
Number One	3/5 stars
PopMatters	8/10 stars
Smash Hits	6/10 stars
Sounds	4/5 stars

Upon its release, Chris Roberts of Sounds noted that the album "ring[s] with booms, croons and soaring falsettos, tripping dramatically over its own analytical word-play and inverted romantic clichés". He added that the lyrics were "among the most ambitious and involving I've encountered all year" and, while the duo's "own slick proficiency dilutes the active angst", there are "moments on this elegantly and eloquently presented record where the Lover Speaks transcend their mute mastery of the synthetic and fly with genuine emotional complexity". Frank Gillespie of Number One said, "Hearts heave as synthesisers are programmed and tears roll down cheeks in the studio as Ultravox's 'Vienna' royalties are fondly remembered. The Lover Speaks are a better looking, more believable pair of crooners than Godley and Creme. The production is slinky and smooth and the lyrics have a sad memory from the past to accommodate everyone. Just the stuff for a quiet night in with your nearest and dearest." Newcastle Evening Chronicle said, "Nothing radically different, just good quality pop-rock performed with verve." Colette Campbell of Smash Hits stated, "This lot must be one of the drippiest cry-baby bands ever. Every song on the album is about the trials and tribulations of being 'in lurve'. The music actually sounds quite nice in a desperately gloomy synthesisery sort of way, so it's a shame they're so overwhelmingly serious and pretentious."

In the US, Billboard wrote, "Intricate vocals and splashy arrangements spark this debut, dominated by vocalist/songwriter David Freeman's soul-drenched pop originals." Terry Atkinson of Los Angeles Times remarked: "Though its ultra-romantic, stylishly emotional approach sometimes leads to Tears for Fears/Wham! mush, this new English duo bows with a frequently intriguing album. Freeman's hyper-emotional lead vocals are sometimes ludicrously overwrought, but all in all this collection is well worth checking out." Cash Box listed the album as one of their "feature picks" during August 1986, calling it an "engaging set led by the interesting and captivating 'No More 'I Love You's'".

Kyle Swanson of the Canadian magazine Nerve said: "Exquisitely produced by Jimmy Iovine, The Lover Speaks is disturbingly likeable. It makes no pretense about being pretentious, and all ten tunes are pure love song pop - but state of the art. A vocal hook here, a sweeping melody there, and soon you're humming and smiling and thinking of sunsets. A supremely good make-out record, The Lover Speaks is rare, stellar pop music." Stuart Coupe of The Sydney Morning Herald said: "The Lover Speaks display the influences of early Motown, and a production style that has led to comparisons with Phil Spector. Well worth investigating."

In a retrospective review, Michael Sutton of AllMusic praised the "stylishly crafted, soulful pop" of "No More 'I Love You's'", which he felt was "elevated by Freeman's booming voice". He wrote that "Absent One" and "Love Is: "I Gave You Everything" "surge with bruised emotions", while "Every Lover's Sign" and "Never to Forget You" "offer respite from all the melancholy confessions". He summarised: "...it's the stinging ache in tracks such as 'Face Me and Smile,' a tale of infidelity, that linger after the album has finished spinning." Imran Khan of PopMatters described the duo's sound as a "baroque and windswept drama of romance and pop" and remarked that the album is "full of bouncy, ebullient grooves and an atmosphere of high drama which still maintains its charm nearly 30 years later".

== Track listing ==
All tracks written and composed by David Freeman and Joseph Hughes except "Of Tears" written by Freeman, Hughes and Barry Gilbert, and "I Close My Eyes and Count to Ten" written by Clive Westlake.

No.	Title	Length
1.	"Every Lover's Sign"	4:38
2.	"No More 'I Love You's'"	4:04
3.	"Never to Forget You"	4:22
4.	"Face Me and Smile"	4:19
5.	"Absent One"	4:16
6.	"Love Is: "I Gave You Everything""	4:27
7.	""This Can't Go On!""	3:52
8.	"Still Faking This Art of Love"	4:22
9.	"Tremble Dancing"	4:16
10.	"Of Tears"	3:43

Cherry Pop CD bonus tracks
No.	Title	Length
11.	"Every Lover's Sign" (7" Remix)	4:07
12.	"I Close My Eyes and Count to Ten"	3:57
13.	"Tremble Dancing" (Extended)	5:17
14.	"Every Lover's Sign" (New York Mix)	5:53
15.	"I Close My Eyes and Count to Ten" (12" Dance Mix)	4:50
16.	"Every Lover's Sign" (Dub Mix)	6:37
17.	"I Close My Eyes and Count to Ten (Reprise)"	1:08
18.	"Every Lover's Sign" (Dub Mix Edit)	5:19

== Personnel ==
The Lover Speaks

- David E.D. Freeman – vocals, producer, arranger
- Joseph Hughes – producer, arranger

with:

- Barry Gilbert – keyboard, arranger (track 10)

Additional personnel

- Nils Lofgren, Steve Lukather, Mike Landau, Robert Farrell – guitar
- Dave A. Stewart – guitar, keyboard
- Roy Bittan – piano
- Charles Judge – synthesizer
- Peter King – saxophone
- Mike Finesilver – bass
- Bobbye Hall, Paulinho da Costa – percussion
- Steve Jordan, Thommy Price – drums
- June Miles-Kingston, Alex Brown, Lynn Davis – backing vocals

Technical

- Jimmy Iovine – producer
- Fred Defaye – engineer
- Marc O'Donoghue – assistant engineer
- Joe Chiccarelli – mixing, recording
- Craig Engel – mix assistant
- Joe Borja – recording
- Robert de la Garza – recording
- John Warwicker – art direction, design
- Matt Mahurin – photography
- Atelier Koninck – typography

== Charts ==
Chart (2015)	Peak position
UK Independent Album Breakers Chart (OCC)	15
