= No More "I Love You's" =

1986 single by the Lover Speaks

"No More 'I Love You's'"

Single by the Lover Speaks

from the album The Lover Speaks
- B-side: "This Can't Go On!"; "Of Tears"
- Released: 30 June 1986
- Length: 4:04
- Label: A&M
- Songwriters: David Freeman; Joseph Hughes
- Producers: Jimmy Iovine; the Lover Speaks

The Lover Speaks singles chronology
"No More 'I Love You's'" (1986)	"Every Lover's Sign" (1986)

"No More 'I Love You's'" is a song written by British musicians David Freeman and Joseph Hughes and recorded by them as the Lover Speaks. It was released in June 1986 as the lead single from their self-titled debut album. The song was covered by the Scottish singer Annie Lennox and became a commercial success for her in 1995, reaching number two on the UK Singles Chart.

== The Lover Speaks version ==
=== Writing ===
"No More 'I Love You's'" was the first song which David Freeman and Joseph Hughes wrote together as the Lover Speaks in 1985. The song originated with Freeman, who came up with the chorus and the bassline, and Hughes then had the idea for the "do-be-do-be-do-do-do" hook. Freeman had the lyrics for the chorus completed at an early stage and wrote those for the verses later on.

As with each track on The Lover Speaks album, "No More 'I Love You's'" is based on a concept in Roland Barthes' book A Lover's Discourse: Fragments (Fragments d'un discours amoureux). In 2015, Freeman recalled of the lyrics, "When you say to someone 'I love you', it could be to your kids, your lover, your parents, usually, you hear, 'I love you, too'. And then one day you say, 'I love you', and there's silence because that person has reached the 'no more 'I love you's' stage'. They cannot say 'I love you, too'. It's as simple as that. All I did lyrically, I think, was put it in Gothic terms."

=== Recording ===
The song was first demoed on a portastudio during a rehearsal studio session, with Robert Farrell on guitar, Barry Gilbert on keyboards and Pete King on drums. It was then demoed again at Pathway Studios in August 1985, with Farrell on guitar, Ian Thomas on drums and Hughes' ex-girlfriend, singer June Miles-Kingston, on backing vocals. The Lover Speaks signed to A&M Records in early 1986 and began recording their debut album with Jimmy Iovine as co-producer. The Pathway Studios demo was used as a guide for the studio version of "No More 'I Love You's'". Freeman later released the Pathway demo, with additional recording in 1992 and 1996, on his fifth solo studio album, Apart & Together (1996).

=== Music video ===
The song's music video was directed by Matt Mahurin and produced by David Naylor and Sharon Oreck. Joseph Hughes told Record Mirror in 1986 that the duo wanted to "create a bit of mystery" with the video and give it a "dark, dreamy quality". He said, "We wanted to make a video which wasn't so obviously promotional, but one which people might watch and be able to say 'that's beautiful'." In the US, it achieved active rotation on MTV.

=== Release ===
"No More 'I Love You's'" was released as the Lover Speaks' debut single on 30 June 1986. It reached its peak at number 58 in the UK Singles Chart on 24 August 1986, becoming the duo's only UK top 100 chart entry as both their debut album and successive singles failed to chart. The song achieved both BBC and regional airplay. It was originally added to BBC Radio 1's 'C List' for the week commencing 21 July 1986 and was promoted to the station's 'A List' the following week, where it remained for four consecutive weeks.

On 21 March 1988, the song was reissued as a single in the UK only, but it failed to reach the top 100. It spent a single week on BBC Radio 1's 'B List' in early April 1988.

=== Critical reception ===
Upon its release, the Bury Free Press awarded the single a 7 out of 10 rating and described it as an "intriguing piece of summer pop with a swaying rhythm and catchy back-up". John Lee of the Huddersfield Daily Examiner called the song both "a totally over-the-top heartbreak ballad which demands to be a monstrous hit" and a "paced-up love anthem [which] is the Walker Brothers in 1986 – big, bold and brilliant". James Belsey of the Bristol Evening Post named it "single of the week" and described it as a "gloriously over-the-top, over-romantic, over-rich song and production with a wildly hummable hook". The Newark Advertiser noted that the "backing comprises a high pitched effect in contrast to the butch bass" and the chorus is "more orthodox, with a punchy backing". The reviewer added how Freeman "shows quite a range" and "there is a startling revelation inasmuch as [his] voice starts in a very low pitch". The Lancashire Evening Telegraph called it an "unusual single" which is "almost poetry to music", with an "easy on the ear background tune that sounds familiar". In the US, Billboard listed the single under "new and noteworthy" and wrote, "A dreamy, eerie, British beat ballad that carries rock overstatement to splendid heights and misses no Spectorian trick; towering walls of sound." Cash Box considered it a "captivating debut" which has a "good shot at CHR" with its "hooky female refrain and powerful lead vocal".

Reviewing its March 1988 reissue, Tom Doyle of Smash Hits selected "No More 'I Love You's'" as the "single of the fortnight". He noted that it "originally flopped without dignity, but at least the Lover Speaks have the rather good sense to realise this record deserves to be top five". He added, "You're sure to recognise it, and whimper and blub at the tale of lurve gone mouldy which unfolds." Betty Page of Record Mirror named it one of the "singles of the week" and praised it as an "epic pop song" which "sounds like Phil Spector-meets-Lord Byron in Tamla Motown". She stated, "Pay attention this time around to David Freeman's exquisite wordplay, wistful voice and playful girly backing vocals and be moved." Jonathan Romney of NME described the "deconstructive tearjerker" as "a colossal, nay Wagnerian, record" on which "very weird chipmunk vocals sing the most contorted hook in history". He concluded, "Buy this and put some Barthes in the charts." John Lee, reviewing again for the Huddersfield Daily Examiner, applauded the reissue, noting it would have been a "criminal waste of a haunting, magnificent, Walker Brothers-esque big ballad". He commented on the "inexplicable failure" of the single's original release and believed it had "got to be a hit in '88".

In a retrospective review of The Lover Speaks, Michael Sutton of AllMusic praised the song as "stylishly crafted, soulful pop" which is "elevated by Freeman's booming voice" and also noted the "soaring, heartbreaking chorus". Imran Khan of PopMatters noted the difference between the original and Lennox's version, with the original "opting for a far more baroque and windswept drama of romance and pop" which he considered to be "an apt description of exactly what the Lover Speaks was all about".

=== Track listings ===
==== 1986 release ====
- 7-inch single (UK, Europe, US, Canada and Australia)
1. "No More 'I Love You's'" – 4:04
2. "This Can't Go On!" – 3:49
- 12-inch single (UK and Europe)
1. "No More 'I Love You's'" – 4:04
2. "Of Tears" – 3:37
3. "This Can't Go On!" – 3:49

==== 1988 UK reissue ====
- 7-inch single
1. "No More 'I Love You's'" – 4:04
2. "Tremble Dancing" – 4:16
- 12-inch and CD single
1. "No More 'I Love You's'" – 4:04
2. "Tremble Dancing" (Extended) – 5:17
3. "Every Lover's Sign" – 4:38
4. "I Close My Eyes and Count to Ten" – 4:50

=== Personnel ===
- David Freeman – lead vocals, backing vocals
- June Miles-Kingston – backing vocals
- Robert Farrell – guitar
- Joseph Hughes – bass
- Steve Jordan – drums

Production

- Jimmy Iovine – production
- The Lover Speaks – production
- Fred Defaye – engineering
- Marc O'Donoghue – assistant engineering
- Joe Chiccarelli – mixing
- Craig Engel – assistant mixing

Other

- John Warwicker – art direction, design
- Matt Mahurin – photography
- Atelier Koninck – typography
- Vivid I.D. – design (1988 reissue only)

=== Charts ===
Chart (1986)	Peak position
Netherlands (Dutch Top 40 Tipparade)	3
UK Singles (OCC)	58
US Cash Box Top 100	88

== Annie Lennox version ==
"No More 'I Love You's'"

Single by Annie Lennox

from the album Medusa
- B-side: "Ladies of the Canyon"
- Released: 6 February 1995
- Studio: The Aquarium (London)
- Genre: Pop
- Length: 4:54
- Label: RCA; BMG
- Songwriters: Joseph Hughes; David Freeman
- Producer: Stephen Lipson

Annie Lennox singles chronology
"Little Bird" / "Love Song for a Vampire" (1993)	"No More 'I Love You's'" (1995)	"A Whiter Shade of Pale" (1995)

Music video
- "No More 'I Love You's'" on YouTube

Scottish singer and songwriter Annie Lennox covered "No More 'I Love You's'" and released it as the lead single from her second studio album, Medusa (1995), in February 1995 by RCA and BMG. The song features slightly altered lyrics from the original version and added background vocals that can be heard around the 2:50 mark of the song.

Lennox's version, produced by Stephen Lipson, was a commercial success, topping the singles charts of Canada, Israel, Italy and Spain, reaching number two on the UK Singles Chart, and becoming a top-20 hit in at least 10 other countries. In the United States, the song reached numbers 18 and 23 on the Cash Box Top 100 and Billboard Hot 100, and peaked atop the Dance Club Songs chart. In 1996, the song won Lennox the Grammy Award for Best Female Pop Vocal Performance at the 38th Annual Grammy Awards. The accompanying music video was directed by Lennox with Joe Dyer, based on an idea by Lennox. It depicts the singer as a courtesan at an old time London bordello. "No More 'I Love You's'" was also featured in the very first episode of The Sopranos.

=== Background ===
In a 1995 article she wrote for The Independent, Lennox stated why she chose to record her own version of the song:

"The Lover Speaks was a group formed by a man called David Freeman. When the song was released it made a mild murmur in the charts, but I don't think it ever really became a hit. There are quite a few songs floating around which should have touched the consciousness of the nation – they should have made their mark, and this is one of them. I thought, well, I might be sticking my neck out to do this, but I really wanted to give it another chance because it's a magnificent song. The lyrics are extraordinary, poetic and abstract – the perfect sort of vehicle for me."

Freeman said in 2015, "When Annie Lennox covered 'No More "I Love You's"', she nailed it! She has the ability to be camp and soulful. We were very lucky that she recorded our song." The success of Lennox's version earned Freeman and Hughes a BMI award each in 1996, as well as three Ivor Novello award nominations for "PRS Most Performed Work", "International Hit of the Year" and "Best Song Musically and Lyrically". It also generated some renewed interest in the Lover Speaks, which in turn prompted Freeman to independently release some of his solo material across six albums in 1996.

=== Music video ===
Lennox co-directed the music video for the song with director and cameraman Joe Dyer. In an interview with The New York Times, Lennox described it as 'a fantasia on the whole "mythology of love"'. The concept for the video was all her idea. She searched out an abandoned music hall in London and created a turn-of-the-century bordello modeled after paintings by Edgar Degas and Henri de Toulouse-Lautrec. In the video, Lennox appears as a courtesan surrounded by different characters, such as male travesti ballerinos (one of whom is played by actor Jake Canuso), in a homage to Les Ballets Trockadero de Monte Carlo. The video was nominated for an MTV award in the category for Best Female Video. Gavin Report praised it as a contender for "video of the year". Music Week viewed it as a "hugely effective if slightly unsettling costume video". Michael Althen of Süddeutsche Zeitung wrote, "We're at a masked ball set sometime in the last century. Annie Lennox plays the Queen of the Night, and while heavy guys play easy girls on the stage, the finer gentlemen in the stalls and in the boxes amuse themselves with less fine ladies. The whole thing looks as if Fellini had gone through all the motions: decadence and dabadaba-dupdupdup."

=== Critical reception ===
The song received positive reviews from most music critics. AllMusic editor Rick Anderson wrote in his review of Medusa, that Lennox's rendition of "No More 'I Love You's'" is "ravishingly, heartbreakingly lovely". Larry Flick from Billboard magazine found that "she picks up right where she left off floating fluttering phrases over a sea of atmospheric synths and strings that are propelled by a subtle, shuffling beat." He added that the track "builds to a dramatic musical climax that perfectly suits the declarative tone of the lyrics." Karen Allen from Cash Box noted its "orchestral plush". Dave Sholin from the Gavin Report remarked, "Whenever Annie Lennox steps in front of a microphone, something magnificent happens. The twists and turns of this haunting new release are a perfect match for her unique talent. And just when it seems all original video concepts have been exhausted, along comes this contender for video of the year." Another editors, Fell and Rufer, said, "Here's yet another way to say "It's over, baby." This new Lennox single is a richly orchestrated breakup song with excellent adult appeal." Karen Leverich from The Heights described it as "a serene blend of voices". Irish Evening Herald felt it "successfully bridged the gap between Nineties pop sophistication and her ritzy hits with Dave Stewart", while Irish Independent praised it as a "gem". Chuck Campbell from Knoxville News Sentinel felt the song is using "a sweeping arrangement" a la "Why", remarking that the singer "draws on her gift of smirking melancholy." In his weekly UK chart commentary, James Masterton stated, that it's "her own beautifully-rendered and faithful version of one of the great long-lost classics of British pop. Right down from the purity of her voice, the cuteness of the backing vocals and the impeccable Valentine's day timing, the song could hardly fail to be a hit."

Pan-European magazine Music & Media concluded that "it's that contrast between the superbly sophisticated cover of the Lover Speaks' 1986 soul hit and the weird intermezzo of talking and hysterical laughing that makes it so irresistible." Head of music Liz Elliott at Metro Radio Group/Newcastle said, "Because she mostly only cuts original material, at first nobody realised it was a cover. Then we all admitted how cleverly she has adjusted the song to her own style." A reviewer from Music Week gave it five out of five, adding that "this unusual song sounds stunning given the Lennox treatment. Radio will gobble it up and, given that it is accompanied by another hugely effective if slightly unsettling costume video, TV will, too." John Kilgo from The Network Forty felt that "it shouldn't take more than one listen to know this mass-appeal song is a total smash." He added that Lennox "displays incredibly polished vocals". In a retrospective review, Pop Rescue declared the song as "a fantastic showcase for her vocals". Tony Cross from Smash Hits gave it five out of five and named it Best New Single. He wrote, "This soft-gothic ballad of lost love is as sad as they come. But it's wrapped in her classy slo-mo cotton wool vocals, and there's a mournful pride about the whole tear-jerking affair that makes you feel not such a saddo when you sing (gently) along. A brilliant record for romantics-with-a-quiet-moment-to-spare everywhere." Another Smash Hits editor, Jordan Paramor, described the song as "haunting". Elizabeth Morse from The Stanford Daily called it "bittersweet" and "a cheerful melody intertwined with devastatingly disconsolate lyrics".

=== Commercial performance ===
The song became the highest-charting solo single for Lennox in the United Kingdom, entering and peaking at number two on the UK Singles Chart for two weeks. It spent a total of 12 weeks on the UK chart. The track also became a top-25 hit in the United States, peaking at number 23 on the Billboard Hot 100. With it, Lennox won the 1995 Grammy Award for Best Female Pop Vocal Performance. The song topped Canada's RPM 100 Hit Tracks chart, the Israeli top 30 singles chart, Italy's Musica e dischi chart, and Spain's AFYVE chart; on the Canadian chart, the song was Lennox's second number-one hit, following "Walking on Broken Glass" in 1992.

=== Samples ===
Lennox's version of "No More 'I Love You's'" has been sampled multiple times. It was first sampled on Trinidadian rapper Nicki Minaj 2010 song's "Your Love", the lead single from her chart-topping debut album Pink Friday (2010). The song was originally recorded two years before but never intended to be put out for release until it was leaked in January 2010. After becoming a hit worldwide, reaching the top twenty in 10 countries, it was slightly rewritten and re-recorded and this revised version was released in June 2010. Prior to the official release of Minaj's song, the cover was sampled in 2009 by Jason Derulo and Auburn in their song "How Did We". It was then sampled by J.R. Rotem for singer Razah's 2010 single called "I Remember", using the same instrumental beat used for "How Did We". Singer Hailee Steinfeld included the sample as well in her 2020 single "I Love You's".

=== Legacy ===
In 2015, Idolator ranked Lennox' version of "No More 'I Love You's'" one of "The 50 Best Pop Singles Of 1995". An editor, Stephen Sears, wrote that the song "is a linguist's delight – 'changes are shifting outside the words' – with a lyric about the verbal clues of a fading love affair." He added, "Lennox's theatrical vocal is on a high wire throughout the song, climbing up and down the scales. She made subtle tweaks to the original lyrics and added a bizarre, spoken middle eight in which she assumes a child's voice, gushing, "There are monsters outside!" The lush moment at 3:08, when a multi-tracked Lennox cascades back in, is flat-out beautiful. "No More 'I Love You's'" lives as a testament to the power of the vocalist as an actor."

In 2025, it featured on episodes of the thriller series Good American Family and A Murder at the End of the World.

=== Track listings ===
7-inch single

No.	Title	Length
1.	"No More 'I Love You's'"
2.	"Ladies of the Canyon"

CD 1

No.	Title	Length
1.	"No More 'I Love You's'"	4:50
2.	"Ladies of the Canyon"	3:40
3.	"Love Song for a Vampire"	4:17

CD 2

No.	Title	Length
1.	"No More 'I Love You's'"	4:51
2.	"Why" (Unplugged Version)	4:59
3.	"Cold" (Unplugged Version)	4:57
4.	"Walking on Broken Glass" (Unplugged Version)	3:59

- Tracks 2, 3, and 4 are taken from a live acoustic session for MTV Unplugged in July 1992

"Whiter Shade of Pale"/"No More 'I Love You's'"

No.	Title	Length
1.	"A Whiter Shade of Pale"	4:49
2.	"No More 'I Love You's'" (Radio edit +)	4:28
3.	"No More 'I Love You's'" (Junior's club mix)	7:34
4.	"No More 'I Love You's'" (Soundfactory mix)	11:40
5.	"No More 'I Love You's'" (Tribal Mix)	8:18*

* Medley of "No More 'I Love You's'", "Take Me to the River", and "Downtown Lights"
+ Junior's Radio Edit

=== Charts and sales ===
==== Weekly charts ====
Chart (1995)	Peak position
Australia (ARIA)	16
Austria (Ö3 Austria Top 40)	11
Belgium (Ultratop 50 Flanders)	27
Belgium (Ultratop 50 Wallonia)	19
Canada Top Singles (RPM)	1
Canada Adult Contemporary (RPM)	1
Denmark (IFPI)	8
El Salvador (UPI)	4
Europe (Eurochart Hot 100)	3
Europe (European Hit Radio)	1
France (SNEP)	13
Germany (GfK)	27
Iceland (Íslenski Listinn Topp 40)	7
Ireland (IRMA)	2
Israel (Israeli Singles Chart)	1
Italy (Musica e dischi)	1
Italy Airplay (Music & Media)	2
Mexico (Notitas Musicales)	1
Netherlands (Dutch Top 40)	23
Netherlands (Single Top 100)	17
New Zealand (Recorded Music NZ)	22
Norway (VG-lista)	12
Poland Airplay (Music & Media)	1
Scottish Singles Sales (Official Charts)	2
Spain (AFYVE)	1
Sweden (Sverigetopplistan)	15
Switzerland (Schweizer Hitparade)	14
UK Singles (Official Charts)	2
UK Airplay (Music Week)	1
US Billboard Hot 100	23
US Adult Contemporary (Billboard)	10
US Dance Club Songs (Billboard)	1
US Dance Singles Sales (Billboard) with "A Whiter Shade of Pale"	2
US Pop Airplay (Billboard)	23
US Cash Box Top 100	18

==== Year-end charts ====
Chart (1995)	Position
Australia (ARIA)	99
Belgium (Ultratop 50 Wallonia)	86
Brazil (Crowley)	42
Canada Top Singles (RPM)	10
Canada Adult Contemporary (RPM)	3
Europe (Eurochart Hot 100)	45
Europe (European Hit Radio)	4
France (SNEP)	89
Iceland (Íslenski Listinn Topp 40)	60
Israel (Israeli Singles Chart)	29
Latvia (Latvijas Top 50)	6
Netherlands (Dutch Top 40)	211
UK Singles (OCC)	52
UK Airplay (Music Week)	10
US Billboard Hot 100	78
US Adult Contemporary (Billboard)	26
US Dance Club Play (Billboard)	21
US Maxi-Singles Sales (Billboard)	35

=== Certifications and sales ===
Region	Certification	Certified units/sales
United Kingdom (BPI)	Gold	400,000^{‡}
^{‡} Sales+streaming figures based on certification alone.

=== Release history ===
Region	Date	Format(s)	Label(s)	Ref.
Australia	6 February 1995	CD; cassette	RCA; BMG	
United Kingdom	6 February 1995	7-inch vinyl; CD1; cassette	RCA; BMG	
United Kingdom	13 February 1995	CD2	RCA; BMG	
Japan	8 March 1995	Mini-CD	RCA	
