= Sleep Like Breathing =

Single by Alison Moyet with David Freeman

from the album Raindancing
- B-side: "Love Resurrection" (Live)
- Released: 21 September 1987
- Genre: Pop
- Length: 4:20
- Label: CBS
- Songwriters: David Freeman; Joseph Hughes
- Producers: Jimmy Iovine; David Freeman; Joseph Hughes

Alison Moyet with David Freeman singles chronology
"Ordinary Girl" (1987)	"Sleep Like Breathing" (1987)	"Love Letters" (1987)

Music video
- "Sleep Like Breathing" on YouTube

"Sleep Like Breathing" is a song by English singer Alison Moyet with David Freeman, released on 21 September 1987 as the fourth and final single from her second studio album, Raindancing. The song was written by Freeman and Joseph Hughes, both of whom made up The Lover Speaks, and was produced by Jimmy Iovine, Freeman and Hughes.

== Background ==
During the 1986 recording sessions of her second studio album Raindancing, Moyet collaborated with the Lover Speaks, who at the time were in the process of recording their debut album with Raindancing's producer, Jimmy Iovine. The Lover Speaks contributed three songs during the sessions: "Sleep Like Breathing", "Take My Imagination to Bed" (released as a b-side on the 12-inch single release of "Weak in the Presence of Beauty in 1987) and an unreleased track. At the time, Moyet was pleased with the results and praised the duo, "Their work is so moody and deep – it's great working with them." Speaking of the three tracks that the duo collaborated with Moyet on, Joseph Hughes of the Lover Speaks told Record Mirror in 1986, "It's nothing radically different from what she's done before. She's very open to new ideas. The music itself is probably more in our vein than she's used to."

== Release ==
"Sleep Like Breathing", a duet between Moyet and the Lover Speaks' singer David Freeman, was included as the fifth track on Raindancing, released by CBS in April 1987. In September 1987, it was released as the album's fourth and final single and reached number 80 in the UK Singles Chart. With the collaboration between the two artists, Moyet and Freeman became friends and the release of "Sleep Like Breathing" sparked further rumours in the British press that the pair were romantically involved. Freeman denied the rumours at the beginning of 1987 and told the Coventry Evening Telegraph, "This is very upsetting for Alison and it's not true. We became very close friends working together in Los Angeles, but we have not slept together. She is going through a traumatic time with her divorce. The trouble is we are friends and if you go out together for a drink, the press jump to conclusions. [When] she came backstage to see us support Eurythmics at Wembley, the press took our picture, put two and two together and got it wrong."

== Critical reception ==
Upon its release as a single, Music & Media described "Sleep Like Breathing" as a "hypnotic and atmospheric ballad". Jerry Smith of Music Week called it a "striking duet, as much for Freeman's superb vocal contribution as Moyet's". He also noted the "sympathetic production" and believed it "should gain good exposure". The Birmingham Daily News commented, "Alison's gorgeous voice glides along in a deep, sweet melody. Here she's duetting with David Freeman. Could be a copper-bottomed hit." Roger Morton of Record Mirror noted the "tingling vocal interplay on this nursery room waltz" and added, "A slow-step rhythm, pulsing keyboards and dreamy harmonies make this the ideal record to practise your breathing exercises to. Alternatively, it could be used as a sex aid for PE sufferers. Now there's value for money." Andy Rutherford of the Gateshead Post was critical, calling it "wistful, mid-paced nonsense from a lady whose voice is not being used to its full potential".

In a review of Raindancing, Betty Page of Record Mirror picked "Sleep Like Breathing" as the album's highlight and described it as "a lullaby which aches with a languid heaviness and sways with veiled suggestion and delicate sensuousness". Jonathan Butler of the US magazine People considered it to be one of only two songs on Raindancing to "exhibit the haunting quality [Moyet] is capable of" and "reminiscent of more cerebral, Kate Bush-like material." J. D. Considine of The Baltimore Sun felt the song "allows Moyet to exploit her dramatic range to its fullest". Digital Audio and Compact Disc Review commented that "there's just no hope for such dull, lethargic ballads as 'Blow Wind Blow' and 'Sleep Like Breathing'". The Trouser Press Record Guide singled-out the song as the album's "low point", calling it "stiflingly schmaltzy".

In a retrospective review of Raindancing, Paul Scott-Bates of the music website Louder Than War commented that the song's single release was "almost criminally ignored". Loz Etheridge of God is in the TV considered it a "tragically overlooked duet" and a "standout" on Raindancing. Adrian Janes of Penny Black Music said the song "plumbs the emotional depths".

== Formats ==
7-inch single

1. "Sleep Like Breathing" – 4:20
2. "Love Resurrection" (Live) – 6:22

12-inch single (UK release)

1. "Sleep Like Breathing" – 4:20
2. "Love Resurrection" (Live) – 6:22
3. "Ne Me Quitte Pas" (Live) – 5:12

12-inch single (UK limited edition release)

1. "Sleep Like Breathing" – 4:20
2. "Love Resurrection" (Live) – 6:22
3. "Don't Burn Down the Bridge" (Live) – 5:00

12-inch single (European release)

1. "Sleep Like Breathing" – 4:20
2. "Love Resurrection" (Live) – 6:22
3. "Ne Me Quitte Pas" (Live) – 5:12
4. "Don't Burn Down the Bridge" (Live) – 5:00

== Personnel ==
- Alison Moyet – vocals
- David Freeman – vocals, producer
- Mike Shipley – associate producer on "Sleep Like Breathing"
- Jimmy Iovine, Joseph Hughes – producer on "Sleep Like Breathing"
- Philippe Bertrand – recording, mixing (live tracks)

== Charts ==
Chart (1987)	Peak position
UK Singles Chart	80
