= Nowhere to Go =

Nowhere to Go may refer to:

== Films ==
- Nowhere to Go (1958 film), a 1958 British film directed by Basil Dearden and Seth Holt
- Nowhere to Go (1998 film), a 1998 American film starring John Shea

== Literature ==
- "Nowhere to Go: The Tragic Odyssey of the Homeless Mentally Ill", a 1988 book by E. Fuller Torrey

== Music ==
- Nowhere to Go, a 2004 album by Takayoshi Ohmura
- "Nowhere to Go" (Hayden James song), a 2019 single by Hayden James
- "Nowhere to Go", a song by Agnostic Front from their 1999 album Riot, Riot, Upstart
- "Nowhere to Go", a song by Annihilator from their 2010 album Annihilator
- "Nowhere to Go", a song by Backstreet Boys from Unbreakable
- "Nowhere to Go", a song by Bad Omens from their 2022 album The Death of Peace of Mind
- "Nowhere to Go", an unreleased George Harrison song
- "Nowhere to Go", a song by Jan Hammer from the album Hammer
- "Nowhere to Go", a song by Melissa Etheridge from her 1995 album Your Little Secret
- "Nowhere to Go", a song by The Miracles from their 1973 album Renaissance
- "Nowhere to Go", a song by Mushroomhead from their 2003 album XIII
- "Nowhere to Go", a song by Nite Jewel from The Music of Grand Theft Auto V
- "Nowhere to Go", a song by Soul Asylum from their 1986 album Time's Incinerator
- "Nowhere2go", a 2018 song by Earl Sweatshirt
- "Stuck in Paris (Nowhere to Go)", a song by After the Fire from their 2005 album Der Kommissar - The CBS Recordings
- "Working Man (Nowhere to Go)", a 1988 song by the Nitty Gritty Dirt Band
