= Laser Love =

Laser Love may refer to:

- Laser Love (album), a 1979 album by After the Fire, or the title song
- Laser Love (song), a 1976 single by T. Rex
