= Life in the City =

Life in the City may refer to:

- "Life in the City", a song by After the Fire from their 1979 album Laser Love
- "Life in the City", a song by the Lumineers from their 2019 album III
