= Kommissar =

Kommissar may refer to:

- Commissar, a Communist political officer
- Commissar (film), a 1967 Soviet film
- Kommissar X, German crime fiction series of books from the Pabel Moewig publishing house
- "Der Kommissar" (song), a song originally recorded by Falco in 1981 and covered in 1982 by After the Fire
- Der Kommissar (album), a 1982 compilation album by After the Fire
- Der Kommissar (TV series), a German television series originally broadcast from 1969 to 1976
- Kommissar Hjuler (b. 1967), a German sound recordist, visual artist, film maker, and police officer

== See also ==
- Commissioner
