= How to Date Men When You Hate Men =

Non-fiction book by Blythe Roberson

- First edition
- Author: Blythe Roberson
- Language: English
- Genre: Non-fiction
- Publisher: Flatiron Books
- Publication date: 2019
- Publication place: United States
- Media type: Print, ebook
- ISBN: 978-1250193421

How to Date Men When You Hate Men is a 2019 non-fiction book written by Blythe Roberson.

== Background ==
The book was completed while Roberson was working as a researcher on The Late Show with Stephen Colbert. The original title of the book was Towards A Unified Theory Of Why I Am Forever Alone In This Life.

== Overview ==
How to Date Men When You Hate Men is non-fiction self-help book by American writer and author Blythe Roberson. The book is a collection of comedic, self-deprecating, and philosophical essays interrogating what it means to date men under patriarchy. Although the title gives the impression that the book offers dating advice, it is instead an exploration of dating in the 21st century under the patriarchy. Roberson conceived the book as a "modern response to A Lover's Discourse" by Roland Barthes.

This book is a self-criticism to the current state of affairs of dating in a contemporary society. Roberson does not hate men, and instead focuses on how men can break and unlearn societal rules and narratives. Roberson draws on her personal experiences for readers to add comedic relief to her writing and demonstrate her personal experiences.

== Reception ==
A review in The Economist describes the response to the book as a "mixed bag", and was irritated by the colloquial style and the many references to Harry Styles. The Booklist review recommends the book for "readers of Phoebe Robinson and other feminist comedy writers". The New York Times review described the book as hilarious, and noted "echoes of the Second Wave's militant political celibates". A review in The New Republic praised the book for exploring "the insoluble truth that Roberson both desires and loathes men. She forces herself to acknowledge that double bind, then persists through the paradox instead of opting out," and describes it as "an invaluable testament to living through heterosexuality".
