= The Lover Speaks =

British new wave duo (1985–1988)

- Origin: England
- Genre: New wave
- Years active: 1985–1988
- Label: A&M
- Past members: David Freeman; Joseph Hughes; Barry Gilbert

The Lover Speaks were an English new wave duo consisting of David Freeman (vocals) and Joseph Hughes (arranger, composer). They wrote and performed the original version of the song "No More 'I Love You's'", covered by Annie Lennox in 1995 for her Medusa album, and which she took to number 2 in the UK Singles Chart.

== History ==
Freeman and Hughes formed the Lover Speaks in 1985, having previously worked together in the punk outfit the Flys. Deriving their name from the Roland Barthes' book A Lover's Discourse: Fragments, the duo began writing material and also recruited keyboard player Barry Gilbert after advertising for a keyboardist. Although Gilbert was not an official member of the group, he would record and tour with the duo. Later in 1985, the band sent a demo tape to Dave Stewart of Eurythmics and soon signed with Stewart's Anxious Music Publishing. Meanwhile, Stewart had forwarded the demo tape to Chrissie Hynde, who sent it to producer Jimmy Iovine. Iovine was successful in getting the band a recording contract with A&M Records in early 1986. John Warwicker, the art director for A&M at the time, recalled in 2022 that the signing of the Lover Speaks was met with "great excitement" by A&M, who "thought they had discovered the Walker Brothers of the 80s".

In July 1986, the band released their debut single, "No More 'I Love You's'", which peaked at No. 58 in the UK. In August, the band's self-titled debut album, The Lover Speaks, was released. Produced by Iovine, and featuring contributions from Stewart, June Miles-Kingston and Nils Lofgren among others, the album was a commercial failure. In September, the album's second single, "Tremble Dancing", also failed to enter the charts. The third and final single, "Every Lover's Sign", was released in October, and in December peaked at No. 6 on the US Billboard Dance Club Songs chart. Following the release of the album, the band opened for Eurythmics during the UK leg of their Revenge world tour.

In February 1987, the band released a cover of Dusty Springfield's "I Close My Eyes and Count to Ten" as a non-album single, but it failed to chart. The duo, with their live band, had played the song on tour, and although Stewart advised against recording it, he produced the song with the duo. In the spring and summer of 1987, the band returned to the studio to record their second album, The Big Lie, with Iovine, Stewart and Daniel Lanois sharing production. A&M Records declined to release it on the grounds that it was "too uncommercial" and, as Freeman later recalled, "too dark and heavy". It was later unofficially released in 1997 as a limited promotional factory-pressed CD.

"No More 'I Love You's'" was re-issued in March 1988, but failed to chart. In July that year, the band played at the Marquee Club in London, and also performed at the Reading Festival in August. The band were wound down by the end of 1988, although Music & Media reported in December 1989 that A&M Records, who were looking to restructure themselves for the new decade, were uncertain whether they would retain the Lover Speaks on their roster. In 1996, Freeman independently released six solo albums, the material of which was recorded between 1985 and 1996.

== Collaborations ==
In late 1986, the band worked with Alison Moyet during sessions for her second studio album. The UK No. 2 album Raindancing was released in 1987 and largely produced by Iovine. Moyet and the band had worked on three songs together, although the Freeman/Hughes-penned "Sleep Like Breathing" was the only song to make the album. In September 1987, it was released as the fourth and final single from the album. A duet between Moyet and Freeman, the song reached No. 80 in the UK. The song "Take My Imagination to Bed", also written by the duo, was released as a B-Side on the 12" version of the UK Top 10 single "Weak in the Presence of Beauty" several months earlier.

During the same period, the duo, along with Gilbert, also wrote the song "I Fall in Love Too Easily" for Kiki Dee. It was released on her 1987 album Angel Eyes, and released as a single in March 1987.

== Discography ==
=== Albums ===
- The Lover Speaks (1986)
- The Big Lie^{[A]}

Notes

- A The Big Lie was shelved in 1987 but received a limited promotional CD release in 1997.

=== Singles ===
Year	Single	Peak positions		Album
Year	Single	UK	US Dance	Album
1986	"No More 'I Love You's'"	58	—	The Lover Speaks
1986	"Tremble Dancing"	—	—	The Lover Speaks
1986	"Every Lover's Sign"	—	6	The Lover Speaks
1987	"I Close My Eyes and Count to Ten"	—	—	Non-album single
1987	"Never to Forget You" (Australia only)	—	—	The Lover Speaks
1988	"No More 'I Love You's'" (re-issue)	—	—	The Lover Speaks
"—" denotes releases that did not chart or were not released.
