= A Whiter Shade of Pale =

1967 single by Procol Harum

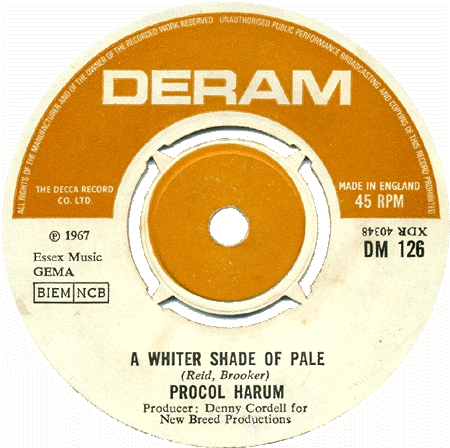

Single by Procol Harum
- B-side: "Lime Street Blues"
- Released: 12 May 1967
- Recorded: April 1967
- Studio: Olympic, London, UK
- Genre: Rock; baroque pop; psychedelic pop; progressive pop; blue-eyed soul
- Length: 4:03 (original single/album version); 5:54 (50th anniversary stereo remix)
- Label: Deram (UK); London (US)
- Songwriters: Keith Reid; Gary Brooker; Matthew Fisher
- Producer: Denny Cordell

Procol Harum singles chronology
"A Whiter Shade of Pale" (1967)	"Homburg" (1967)

"A Whiter Shade of Pale" is a song by the English rock band Procol Harum that was issued as their debut single on 12 May 1967. The single reached number 1 in the UK Singles Chart on 8 June and stayed there for six weeks. Without much promotion, it reached number 5 on the US Billboard Hot 100. One of the anthems of the 1967 Summer of Love, it is one of the most commercially successful singles in history, having sold more than 10 million copies worldwide. In the years since, "A Whiter Shade of Pale" has become an enduring classic, with more than 1,000 known cover versions by other artists.

With its Bach-derived instrumental melody, soulful vocals, melancholic tone, and unusual lyrics, the music of "A Whiter Shade of Pale" was composed by Gary Brooker and Matthew Fisher, while the lyrics were written by Keith Reid. Originally, the writing credits only listed Brooker and Reid. In 2009, Fisher won his battle to be recognised as co-writer of the music in a unanimous ruling from the Law Lords.

In 1977, the song was named joint winner (along with Queen's "Bohemian Rhapsody") of "The Best British Pop Single 1952–1977" at the Brit Awards. In 1998, the song was inducted into the Grammy Hall of Fame. In 2004, the performing rights group Phonographic Performance Limited recognised it as the most-played record by British broadcasting of the past 70 years and Rolling Stone placed it 57th on its list of "The 500 Greatest Songs of All Time". In 2009, it was reported as the most played song in the last 75 years in public places in the UK.

The song has been included in many music compilations over the decades and has also been used in the soundtracks of numerous films and television shows, including The Big Chill, Purple Haze, Breaking the Waves, The Boat That Rocked, Tour of Duty, House M.D., Memory, Martin Scorsese's segment of New York Stories, Stonewall, Oblivion, Ken Burns and Lynn Novick's documentary series The Vietnam War, and the limited series The Offer and Billions. Cover versions of the song have also been featured in many films, for example, by King Curtis in Withnail and I and by Annie Lennox in The Net.

== Lyrics ==
Keith Reid got the title and starting point for the song at a party. He overheard Guy Stevens of Island Records at the party saying to his wife Diane Cox, "You've turned a whiter shade of pale", and the phrase stuck in his mind.The original lyrics had four verses, of which only two are heard on the original recording. The third verse has been heard in live performances by Procol Harum, and more seldom the fourth. Claes Johansen, in his book Procol Harum: Beyond the Pale, suggests that the song "deals in metaphorical form with a male/female relationship which after some negotiation ends in a sexual act". This is supported in Lives of the Great Songs by Tim de Lisle, who remarks that the lyrics concern a drunken seduction, which is described through references to sex as a form of travel, usually nautical, using mythical and literary journeys. Other observers have also commented that the lyrics concern a sexual relationship.

Contrary to the above interpretations, Reid was quoted in the February 2008 issue of Uncut magazine as saying:

I was trying to conjure a mood as much as tell a straightforward, girl-leaves-boy story. With the ceiling flying away and room humming harder, I wanted to paint an image of a scene. I wasn't trying to be mysterious with those images, I was trying to be evocative. I suppose it seems like a decadent scene I'm describing. But I was too young to have experienced any decadence, then. I might have been smoking when I conceived it, but not when I wrote. It was influenced by books, not drugs.

Structurally and thematically, the song is unusual. While the recorded Procol Harum version is 4:03 long, it is composed of only two verses, each with chorus. The piece is also more instrument-driven than most songs of the period, and with a much looser rhyme scheme. Its unusually allusive and referential lyrics are much more complex than most lyrics of the time (for example, the chorus alludes to Geoffrey Chaucer's "The Miller's Tale"). The lyricist, Keith Reid, said: "I'd never read The Miller's Tale in my life. Maybe that's something that I knew subconsciously, but it certainly wasn't a conscious idea for me to quote from Chaucer, no way."

The phrase a whiter shade of pale has since gained widespread use in the English language, as noted by several dictionaries. As such, the phrase is today often used in contexts independent of any consideration of the song. It has also been heavily paraphrased, in forms like "an Xer shade of Y", to the extent that it has been recognised as a snowclone – a type of cliché and phrasal template.

== Composition ==
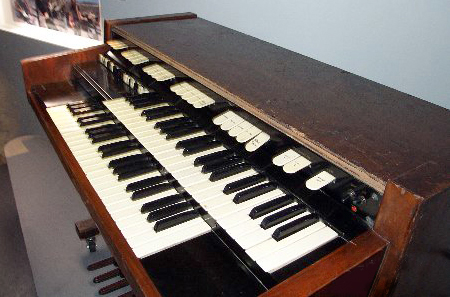
The song's distinctive, Bach-inspired organ part was played on a Hammond M102.

The song is in moderate time in C major and is characterised by the bassline moving stepwise downwards in a repeated pattern throughout. In classical music this repeated pattern is known as a ground bass. The harmonic structure is identical for the organ melody, the verse and the chorus, except that the chorus finishes with a cadence. The main organ melody appears at the beginning and after each verse/chorus. But it is also heard throughout, playing variations of its theme and counterpointing the vocal line. As the chorus commences "And so it was, that later ...", the vocal and organ accompaniment begin a short crescendo, with the organist running his finger rapidly down and up the entire keyboard. The final instrumental fades out to silence — a common device in pop music of the time.

Similarity has been noted between the Hammond Organ line of "A Whiter Shade of Pale" and J. S. Bach's Air from his Orchestral Suite No. 3 2. Air, BWV 1068, (the "Air on the G string"), where the sustained opening note of the main melodic line flowers into a free-flowing melody against a descending bass line.

"Air" of Bach's third Orchestral Suite
performed by the United States Air Force Band Strings

Bach Air from Suite 3 bars 1–2

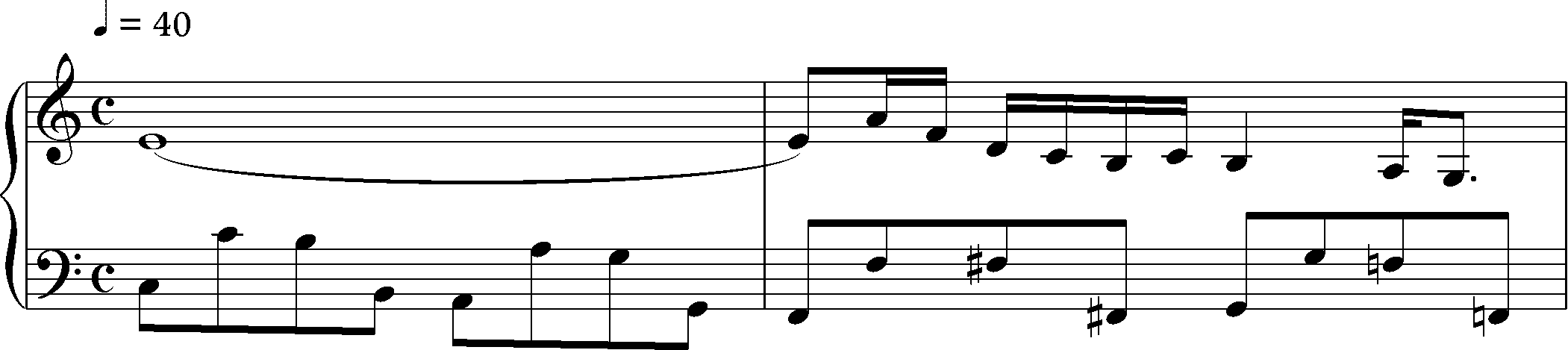
Bach Air from Suite 3 bars 1–3

Gary Brooker said of his composition in his interview with Uncut magazine:

If you trace the chordal element, it does a bar or two of Bach's 'Air on a G String' before it veers off. That spark was all it took. I wasn't consciously combining rock with classical, it's just that Bach's music was in me.

Allan Moore notes in the 2018 BBC radio series "Soul Music" that the resemblance "creates the sense of [Bach’s] music without actually quoting it". The similarity is also referred to humorously in the 1982 play The Real Thing by Tom Stoppard and in the 1991 film The Commitments. The music also borrows ideas from "When a Man Loves a Woman" by Percy Sledge.

== Recording ==
Procol Harum recorded "A Whiter Shade of Pale" at Olympic Sound Studios in London, England. The recording was produced by Denny Cordell. Because they did not have a regular drummer, the drums were played by Bill Eyden, a session musician. The track was completed in two takes, with no subsequent overdubbing.

A few days after the session, the band re-recorded the song with their newly recruited drummer, Bobby Harrison, at Advision Studios. This version was discarded, and one of the original mono recordings was chosen for release as the band's debut single. The B-side was "Lime Street Blues", another Brooker–Reid song, which the band recorded at Advision.

Cordell was concerned that the sound of "A Whiter Shade of Pale" might prove problematic on the radio, due to the prominence of the drummer's cymbals. He therefore sent an acetate copy to Radio London, and his worries were assuaged when the disc jockey played the disc on-air and announced: "That sounds like a massive hit."

== Release and reception ==
The single was released on 12 May 1967 in the United Kingdom by Deram Records and entered Record Retailer's chart (later the UK Singles Chart) on 25 May. In two weeks it reached number 1, where it stayed for six weeks. Writing in 2005, Jim Irvin of Mojo said that its arrival at number 1 on 8 June 1967, on the same day that the Beatles' Sgt. Pepper's Lonely Hearts Club Band topped the national albums chart, marked the start of the Summer of Love in Britain. In December 1967, New Musical Express readers voted the song "Best British Disc This Year", ahead of "All You Need Is Love" and "Massachusetts".

According to music historian Harvey Kubernik, in the context of the Summer of Love, "A Whiter Shade of Pale" was the "one song [that] stood above all others, its Everest-like status conferred by no less than John Lennon and Paul McCartney, who were enthralled by the Chaucerian wordplay and heavenly Baroque accompaniment". Kubernik also writes that, amid the search for higher consciousness during the flower power era, the song "galvanised a congregation of disaffected youth dismissive of traditional religion but anxious to achieve spiritual salvation".

In a 1981 article on the musical and societal developments of 1967, for The History of Rock, sociomusicologist Simon Frith described "A Whiter Shade of Pale" as the year's "most distinctive single", through its combination of "white soul vocal and a Bach organ exercise" and enigmatic lyrics that "hinted at a vital secret open only to people in the right, drug-determined, state of mind". Beach Boys leader Brian Wilson had a profound reaction to hearing the song and momentarily believed that it was his funeral march; in a 2004 interview, he said, "When I hear it now, I [still] imagine myself at my own funeral."

In the United States, the single reached number 5 on the Billboard Hot 100 and sold over 1 million copies. It stayed at its peak position for two weeks beginning the week of 29 July 1967. It also peaked at number 22 on the soul charts there. Cash Box called it "a haunting, imaginative ballad [that] has a winning sound". Record World said it is distinguished by "a very eerie melody and lyrics that seem to make sense and then don't." The song was included on the US release of the Procol Harum album, in September 1967, but not on the subsequent UK version. In the Netherlands, the single entered the chart at number 1 in June 1967 and reached number 1 again in July 1972. A May 1972 re-release on Fly Records peaked at number 13 in the UK. Due to concerns about overexposure, the song was removed from the band's repertoire in 1969 for a number of years.

"A Whiter Shade of Pale" has continued to receive critical acclaim. Along with Queen's "Bohemian Rhapsody", "A Whiter Shade of Pale" was jointly recognised as "The Best British Pop Single 1952–1977" at the BRIT Awards, part of Elizabeth II's Silver Jubilee. In 1998 the song was inducted into the Grammy Hall of Fame. In 2004, it appeared at number 57 on Rolling Stone magazine's list of the "500 Greatest Songs of All Time". British TV station Channel 4 placed the song at number 19 in its chart of "The 100 Greatest No. 1 Singles". In 2018, the song was inducted into the Rock and Roll Hall of Fame in a new category for singles.

After Brooker's death, the song gained download sales and then entered the UK Official Singles Sales Chart at number 38 on 25 February 2022. In The Netherlands the song also regained popularity after the 2021 murder of crime reporter Peter R. de Vries, who considered it his favorite song.

== Promotional films ==
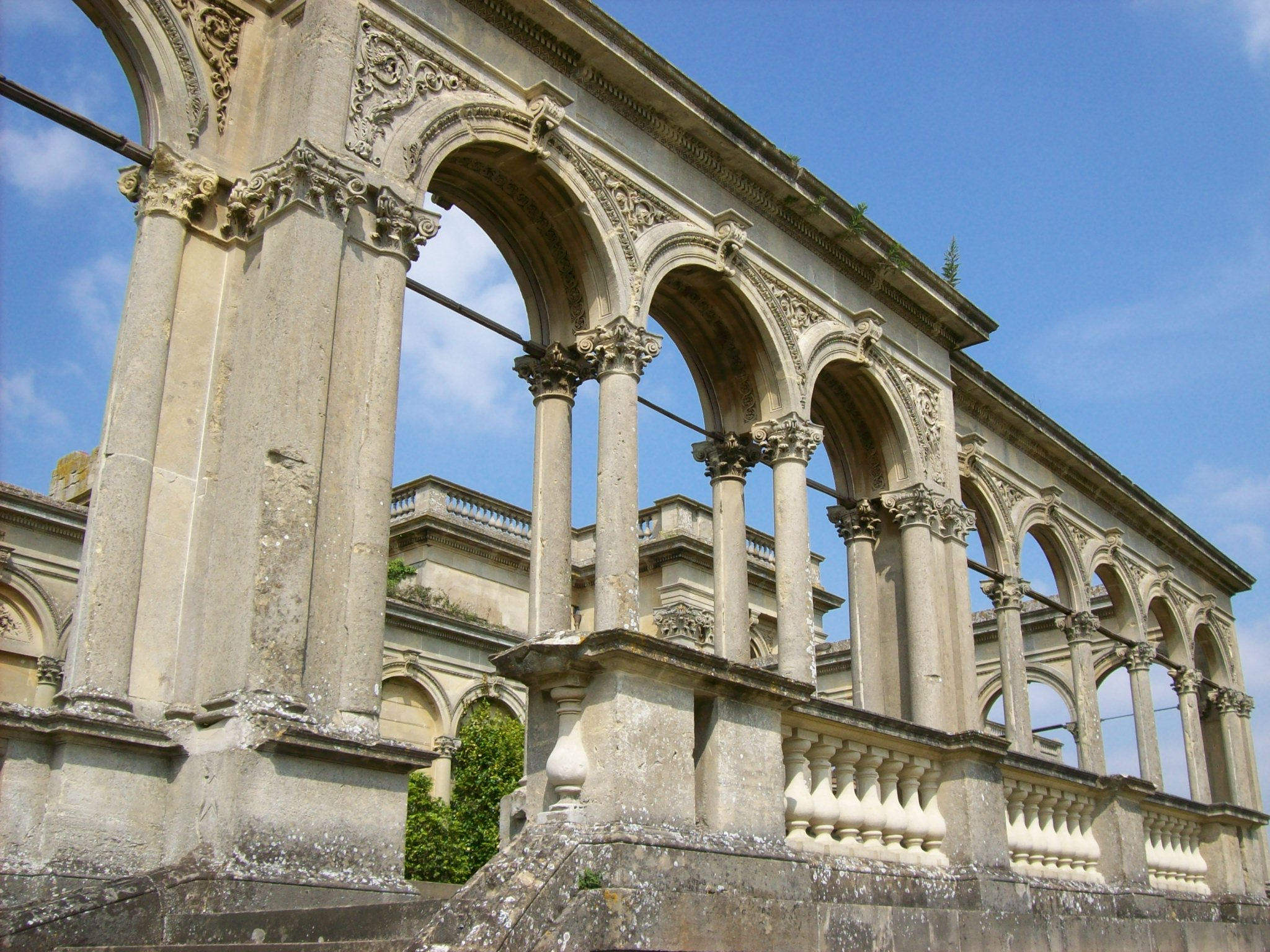
One of the clips for the song was filmed at Witley Court, part of which was gutted by fire in 1937.

The first promotional clip for "A Whiter Shade of Pale" was shot in the ruins of Witley Court in Worcestershire, England. It features four of the five musicians who played on the hit single: Gary Brooker, Matthew Fisher, David Knights and Ray Royer, in performance and walking through the ruins. Only the drummer in the video is not on the record: early band member Bobby Harrison is seen miming to session man Bill Eyden's drumming. The film was directed by Peter Clifton, whose insertion of Vietnam War newsreel footage caused it to be banned from airplay on the BBC's Top of the Pops TV show.

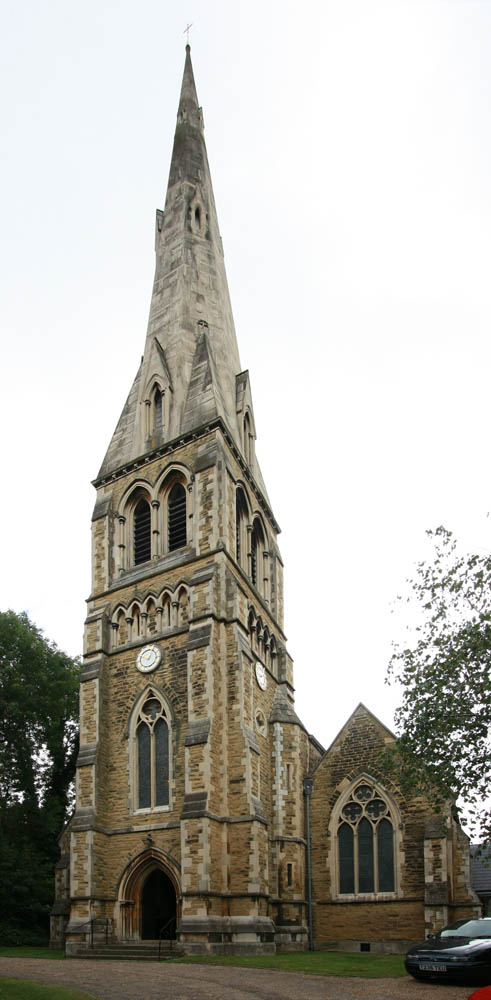
St Anne's Church, Highgate, second promotional clip

Procol Harum subsequently made a second promotional clip, using "Scopitone" technology. By this time, Robin Trower and B.J. Wilson had replaced Royer and Harrison in the band, so only three of the five musicians on the recording are represented. No performance footage appears in this film – only scenes of the five musicians cavorting around London and running across fields.

The same lineup, with Fisher wearing a monk's cowl, mimed to the song on Top of the Pops, although Brooker sang live. Black-and-white footage of the performance has been shown online. The song represents 1967 on the 2004 DVD release Top of the Pops 40th Anniversary 1964–2004.

There was also a film shot as part of Joel Gallen's Deja-View music video series. Originally airing on various networks from late 1985 into 1986, this video starred Harry Dean Stanton and Bernie Taupin, but featured no member of the band. It has also aired on VH1 Classic, and has recently surfaced online.

== Authorship lawsuit ==
In 2005, former Procol Harum organist Matthew Fisher filed suit in the High Court against Gary Brooker and his publisher, claiming that he co-wrote the music for the song. Fisher won the case on 20 December 2006 but was awarded 40% of the composers' share of the music copyright, rather than the 50% he was seeking and was not granted royalties for the period before 2005.

Brooker and publisher Onward Music were granted leave to appeal, and a hearing on the matter was held before a panel of three judges during the week of 1 October 2007. The decision, on 4 April 2008, by Lord Justice Mummery, in the Court of Appeal upheld Fisher's co-authorship but ruled that he should receive no royalties as he had taken too long (38 years) to bring his claim to litigation. Full royalty rights were returned to Brooker.

On 5 November 2008, Fisher was granted permission to appeal this decision to the House of Lords. Lawyers said at the time that it was the first time that the Law Lords were asked to rule on a copyright dispute involving a song. The appeal was heard in the House of Lords on 22–23 April 2009.

On 30 July 2009 the Law Lords unanimously ruled in Fisher's favour. They noted that the delay in bringing the case had not caused any harm to the other party; on the contrary, they had benefited financially from it. They also pointed out that there were no time limits to copyright claims under English law. The right to future royalties was therefore returned to Fisher. Brooker claimed that the case had cost him £1 million in legal fees.

== Personnel ==
- Gary Brooker – vocals, piano
- Matthew Fisher – Hammond M-102 organ
- Ray Royer – guitar
- David Knights – bass
- Bill Eyden – drums

== Charts ==
=== Weekly charts ===
Chart (1967)	Peak position
Argentina (Escalera a la fama)	9
Australia (Go-Set)	1
Australia (Kent Music Report)	1
Austria (Ö3 Austria Top 40)	4
Belgium (Ultratop 50 Flanders)	1
Belgium (Ultratop 50 Wallonia)	1
Brazil (IBOPE)	1
Canada Top Singles (RPM)	1
Canada Adult Contemporary (RPM)	1
Denmark (Denmark Radio)	3
Finland (Suomen Musiikikaupplasilitto)	4
France (IFOP)	1
Ireland (IRMA)	1
Italy (Musica e dischi)	1
Japan (Oricon)	47
Malaysia (Radio Malaysia)	1
Netherlands (Dutch Top 40)	1
Netherlands (Single Top 100)	1
New Zealand (Listener)	1
Norway (VG-lista)	3
Poland (Scout Radio)	2
Rhodesia (Lyons Maid)	2
South Africa (Springbok Radio)	1
Spain (Promusicae)	1
Sweden (Kvällstoppen)	4
Sweden (Tio i Topp)	8
Switzerland	1
UK (Record Retailer)	1
US Billboard Hot 100	5
US Hot R&B/Hip-Hop Songs (Billboard)	22
US Cash Box Top 100	5
West Germany (GfK)	1

Chart (1972)	Peak position
Australia (Kent Music Report)	18
Belgium (Ultratop 50 Flanders)	23
Ireland (IRMA)	12
Netherlands (Dutch Top 40)	1
Netherlands (Single Top 100)	1
UK (BMRB)	13

=== Year-end charts ===
Chart (1967)	Position
Australia (Go-Set)	14
Australia (Kent Music Report)	9
Austria (Ö3 Austria)	19
Belgium (Ultratop Flanders)	9
Canada Top Singles (RPM)	27
France (IFOP)	3
Netherlands (Dutch Top 40)	14
South Africa (Springbok Radio)	19
Spain (Promusicae)	4
US Billboard Hot 100	38
US Cash Box Top 100	47
West Germany (Official German Charts)	17

Chart (1972)	Position
Netherlands (Dutch Top 40)	21
Netherlands (Single Top 100)	18

== Certifications and sales ==
Region	Certification	Certified units/sales
Belgium	—	25,000
France	—	700,000
Italy	—	300,000
Netherlands	—	100,000
New Zealand (RMNZ)	Platinum	30,000^{‡}
Spain	—	30,000
United Kingdom Original release	—	600,000
United Kingdom (BPI) 2005 release	Gold	400,000^{‡}
United States	—	1,000,000
^{‡} Sales+streaming figures based on certification alone.

== HSAS version ==
"A Whiter Shade of Pale" was covered by American rock supergroup Hagar Schon Aaronson Shrieve for their 1984 album Through the Fire. It was released as the album's only single and reached No. 94 on the Billboard Hot 100 chart.

=== Personnel ===
- Sammy Hagar – vocals
- Neal Schon – guitars
- Kenny Aaronson – bass
- Michael Shrieve – drums

== Annie Lennox version ==
"A Whiter Shade of Pale"

Single by Annie Lennox

from the album Medusa
- B-side: "No More 'I Love You's'" (remix); "Heaven"; "(I'm Always Touched by Your) Presence Dear"; "Love Song for a Vampire"; "Don't Let It Bring You Down"; "You Have Placed a Chill in My Heart"; "Here Comes the Rain Again"; "Ladies of the Canyon"
- Released: 29 May 1995
- Studio: The Aquarium (London)
- Genre: Pop
- Length: 5:16 (album version); 4:49 (single version)
- Label: RCA; BMG
- Songwriters: Keith Reid; Gary Brooker; Matthew Fisher
- Producer: Stephen Lipson

Annie Lennox singles chronology
"No More 'I Love You's'" (1995)	"A Whiter Shade of Pale" (1995)	"Waiting in Vain" (1995)

Music video
- "A Whiter Shade of Pale" on YouTube

"A Whiter Shade of Pale" was covered by Scottish singer-songwriter Annie Lennox for her second solo album, Medusa (1995). The song was produced by Stephen Lipson and released as the album's second single in May 1995, becoming a top-40 hit in Europe and Canada. It was also used in Irwin Winkler's film The Net, appearing in closing credits. The accompanying music video was directed by Joe Dyer, who had previously co-directed the video for "No More I Love You's" with Lennox.

=== Critical reception ===
Steve Baltin from Cash Box named the song Pick of the Week, writing, "For the second single from her Medusa album, which is all covers, Lennox takes on one of rock's true classics. Sans the psychedelic feel that Procol Harum had on the original version the song metamorphisizes in Lennox’s distinctly elegant hands. Starting with a simple, yet lovely, keyboard sound the song takes on the cool detached feel of Lennox that one of music's most accomplished singers has become famous for. To say a Lennox song, any Lennox track, is classy is almost redundant, but that is exactly the word to sum up her version of the song. Look for this to successfully hit, especially 'No More 'I Love You's' with ample amounts of radio support from Adult Contemporary and CHR." Chuck Campbell from Knoxville News Sentinel complimented the song as a "stately remake".

Pan-European magazine Music & Media wrote, "One of those classics that nobody but "Madam Medusa" dares to touch." Steve Sutherland from NME felt the album "is worth investigation if only for Ms. Lennox's interpretation of [...] 'A Whiter Shade of Pale'. The original is such flimsy pseudo-classical tripe that even its author has admitted he hasn't got the faintest idea what it's about but, miraculously, Ms Lennox renders it even more absurd, her version resembling the house band at a particularly godforsaken holiday camp at the end of a very long, damp and underpopulated season." Smash Hits predicted that Lennox' cover version would be a future hit, writing, "This second track from Annie's LP of cover versions Medusa is certain to be a major hit. [...] Although unlikely to be a number one — Jacko will probably have that department all sewn up [with 'Scream'] — this will be a huge hit all the same. Corker!"

=== Personnel ===
- Annie Lennox – vocals
- Peter-John Vettese, Andy Richards, Mathew Cooper – keyboards
- Luís Jardim – bass
- Tony Pastor – guitar
- Dan Gillen, Neil Conti – drums

=== Charts ===
==== Weekly charts ====
Chart (1995)	Peak position
Australia (ARIA)	56
Belgium (Ultratop 50 Flanders)	48
Belgium (Ultratop 50 Wallonia)	16
Canada Top Singles (RPM)	37
Canada Adult Contemporary (RPM)	2
Europe (Eurochart Hot 100)	45
Europe (European Hit Radio)	8
France (SNEP)	17
Germany (GfK)	77
Iceland (Íslenski Listinn Topp 40)	12
Ireland (IRMA)	25
Israel (Israeli Singles Chart)	7
Netherlands (Single Top 100)	39
New Zealand (Listener)	1
Scottish Singles Sales (Official Charts)	11
Switzerland (Schweizer Hitparade)	26
UK Singles (Official Charts)	16
US Bubbling Under Hot 100 (Billboard)	1
US Dance Singles Sales (Billboard) with "No More 'I Love You's"	2
US Hot Singles Sales (Billboard)	66

==== Year-end charts ====
Chart (1995)	Position
Belgium (Ultratop 50 Wallonia)	51
Canada Adult Contemporary (RPM)	41
France (SNEP)	66
Latvia (Latvijas Top 50)	63
US Maxi-Singles Sales (Billboard)	35

=== Release history ===
Region	Date	Format(s)	Label(s)	Ref.
Australia	29 May 1995	CD; cassette	RCA; BMG	
United Kingdom	29 May 1995	CD; cassette	RCA; BMG	
Japan	21 June 1995	Mini-CD	RCA; BMG	
United States	5 September 1995	Contemporary hit radio	Arista; BMG	

== Other charting versions ==
A cover by The Hesitations reached number 100 on the Billboard charts in 1968, and number 83 in Canada.

Another version by R. B. Greaves reached number 82 in the Billboard charts in 1970, and number 85 in Canada.

== Sources ==
- Johansen, Claes (2000). Procol Harum: Beyond the Pale. London: SAF Publishing. p. 86. ISBN 0-946719-28-4. "Procol Harum Beyond The Pale."
- Kubernik, Harvey (2017). 1967: A Complete Rock Music History of the Summer of Love. New York, NY: Sterling. ISBN 978-1-4549-2052-6.
