= Joseph Hughes (musician) =

British bassist and songwriter

- Genres: Punk rock, new wave
- Occupations: Musician, songwriter
- Instrument: Bass guitar
- Labels: EMI, Harvest, A&M

Joseph Hughes is a British bassist and songwriter, best known for being a member of the punk band the Flys and the new wave duo the Lover Speaks.

== Background ==
Hughes began his musical career in the mid-1970s as bassist in the band Midnight Circus. In 1976, the band evolved into the punk group the Flys, which also featured Neil O'Connor and David Freeman. The band recorded a number of singles, two EPs; Bunch of Fives (1977) and Four from the Square (1980), and two studio albums; Waikiki Beach Refugees (1978) and Own (1979) After the band split in 1980, Hughes went on to play bass in Tearjerkers, a band formed by Roddy Radiation.

In 1985, Hughes reunited with Freeman, who had suggested to him that they form a duo which became the Lover Speaks. The pair began writing material and also recruited the assistance of keyboardist Barry Gilbert. With the help of Dave Stewart of Eurythmics and Chrissie Hynde of the Pretenders, producer Jimmy Iovine received the duo's demo tape, who then helped them sign to A&M Records in early 1986. Later that year, the duo's self-titled debut album, The Lover Speaks, was released. Produced by Iovine, it contained the single "No More "I Love You's"", which peaked at No. 58 in the UK. A further two singles were lifted from the album; "Tremble Dancing" and "Every Lover's Sign". The latter reached peaked at No. 6 on the US Billboard Dance Club Songs chart.

In 1987, the Lover Speaks released a cover of Dusty Springfield's "I Close My Eyes and Count to Ten" as their next single, but it was not a commercial success. During that same year, the duo recorded their second album The Big Lie, however A&M Records decided not to release it. Having worked with Alison Moyet in 1986, the Freeman/Hughes-penned "Sleep Like Breathing" was lifted as the fourth and final single in late 1987 from her album Raindancing. A duet with Freeman, the song reached No. 80 in the UK. The Lover Speaks would split in 1988.

In 1995, "No More "I Love You's"" was covered by Annie Lennox for her Medusa album. Released as a single in February, the song reached No. 2 on the UK Singles Chart that month and went on to secure Lennox a Grammy Award. The success of Lennox's cover saw Hughes and Freeman each receive a BMI award in 1996, as well as three Ivor Novello award nominations; the "PRS Most Performed Work", "International Hit of the Year" and "Best Song Musically and Lyrically".

In 2000, Hughes formed Cicero Buck with singer-songwriter Kris Wilkinson. The pair had initially met at the Exit/In in Nashville during 1998, and started a long-distance relationship before Wilkinson relocated to the UK. The duo's debut album, Delicate Shades of Grey, was released in 2002, and has been followed by Humbucky (2004), A Taste of Wonderful (EP, 2012) and The Birth of Swagger (2015). For the 2015 re-issue of The Lover Speaks album by Cherry Red, both Hughes and Freeman contributed to the album's booklet by providing song annotations.

== Discography ==
=== Roddy Radiation & The Tearjerkers ===
- "Desire" (single, 1982)

=== Cicero Buck ===
- Delicate Shades of Grey (album, 2002)
- Humbucky (album, 2004)
- A Taste of Wonderful (EP, 2012)
- The Birth of Swagger (album, 2015)
