= June Miles-Kingston =

British singer and drummer

- Genres: Punk rock, new wave, ska
- Occupation(s): Vocalist, drummer
- Years active: 1979–present

June Patricia Miles-Kingston is a British singer and drummer, best known for her work with various successful bands and singers in the 1980s. She was a founding member of the post-punk group the Mo-dettes, which lasted from 1979 to 1982, and later became a session drummer and backing vocalist for a variety of British post-punk, new wave, and pop artists. She is the cousin of Paul Miles-Kingston, who reached number 3 in the UK charts with Pie Jesu in 1985.

== Career ==
Miles-Kingston was an art student who studied at the National Film School. She helped Julien Temple make the Sex Pistols' film The Great Rock 'n' Roll Swindle. In 1979 she then moved in to squat with Kate Korris of the Slits and Joe Strummer of the Clash and bought a drum kit from Paul Cook of the Sex Pistols for £40.

Within a few months, Miles-Kingston and Korris had formed the Mo-dettes with two friends, Jane Crockford and Ramona Carlier. The Mo-dettes toured for four years, supporting two-tone ska bands such as Madness and the Specials before breaking up in 1982.

Miles-Kingston went on to play drums with Everything but the Girl, the Fun Boy Three (her backing vocals being evident in "Our Lips Are Sealed") and the Communards. She also played drums for Feargal Sharkey on his hits "A Good Heart" and "You Little Thief". In 1984, she released a solo single, "Say You", and sang the theme to the Channel 4 six-part comedy series They Came from Somewhere Else. In 1986, she contributed backing vocals to two tracks ("Eiledon" and "Remembrance Day") on the Big Country album The Seer. She also contributed backing vocals to songs on Microdisney's The Clock Comes Down the Stairs (1985), as well as on their 39 Minutes album (1987) and also prominently on the Lover Speaks' self-titled debut album, which included "No More I Love You's" (1986), later covered by Annie Lennox on her 1995 album Medusa. In 1989, Miles-Kingston covered "Comment te dire adieu?" with Jimmy Somerville and the song reached number 14 on the UK Singles Chart.

Miles-Kingston went on to study fine art at St. Martin's and filmmaking at the University of Sussex. Her film Dear Miss Bassey was awarded a prize at the London 'Shorts' Film Festival. She continues to make music and films and is writing about her musical experiences.
