= Batteries Not Included (album) =

Studio album by After the Fire
- Released: 19 March 1982
- Recorded: Late 1981
- Studio: The Record Plant (New York City)
- Genre: Progressive rock; pop rock
- Length: 41:12
- Label: CBS
- Producer: Mack

After the Fire chronology
80-f (1980)	Batteries Not Included (1982)	Der Kommissar (1982)

Batteries Not Included is the fourth and final album of all-new material released by UK band After the Fire. The official release date was 19 March 1982, but some sources on the Internet claim a late 1981 release date (the first two singles from this album, Dancing in the Shadows and Frozen Rivers, were released in 1981). "Dancing in the Shadows" would later become a minor U.S. hit, after it was featured on the band's lone American album release, ATF (which was released as Der Kommissar outside of the U.S.).

== Track listing ==
Side one

1. "Short Change" (Andy Piercy, Peter Banks) (3:19)
2. "Frozen Rivers" (Piercy, Banks) (3:30)
3. "Sometimes" (Piercy, Banks, John Russell) (3:07)
4. "Sailing Ship" (Piercy, Banks) (3:54)
5. "I Don't Understand Your Love" (Piercy, Banks) (2:50)
6. "The Stranger" (Piercy, Banks) (3:43)

Side two

1. "Rich Boys" (Piercy, Banks) (3:01)
2. "Carry Me Home" (Piercy, Banks) (3:21)
3. "Dancing in the Shadows" (Piercy, Banks) (3:02)
4. "Space Walking" (Piercy, Banks) (3:11)
5. "Gina" (Piercy, Banks) (1:37)
6. "Stuck in Paris (Nowhere To Go)" (Banks, Pete King) (2:45)
7. "Bright Lights" (Piercy, Banks) (3:32)
