= A Lover's Discourse: Fragments =

1977 book by Roland Barthes

- Cover of the first edition
- Author: Roland Barthes
- Original title: Fragments d’un discours amoureux
- Language: French
- Publication date: 1977
- Publication place: France
- OCLC: 10314663

A Lover's Discourse: Fragments (French: Fragments d’un discours amoureux) is a 1977 book by Roland Barthes. It contains a list of "fragments", some of which come from literature and some from his own philosophical thought, of a lover's point of view. Barthes calls them "figures"—gestures of the lover at work.

== Film adaptations ==
The book has been used as the basis for films of fiction:

Hong Kong film Lover's Discourse (戀人絮語, 2010), directed by Derek Tsang and Jimmy Wan. The film consisted of four interconnected stories about love and lovers. The ensemble cast of the film includes Eason Chan, Karena Lam, Kay Tse, Mavis Fan, Eddie Peng, Jacky Heung and Kit Chen.

French film Let the Sunshine In (Un Beau soleil intérieur, 2017), directed by Claire Denis. That film, which tells the attempts of a middle-aged woman to find love with a series of successive partners, stars Juliette Binoche and a cast including Xavier Beauvois and Nicolas Duvauchelle.

Filipino film The Loved One (2026), directed by Irene Emma Villaflor. The film follows two former lovers who reunite after a decade apart and reflect on the relationship that once bound them together. Told in a non-linear narrative, it explores the highs and lows of their ten-year romance through memories that gradually reveal the reasons behind their separation. It stars Anne Curtis and Jericho Rosales.

== Cultural references ==
- The lyrical themes on the British duo The Lover Speaks' 1986 eponymous debut album were based on ideas from A Lover's Discourse, with singer David Freeman describing the album as an attempt to produce a "musical cartoon of [Barthes'] book".
- A Lover's Discourse is mentioned in, and central to, the plot of Jeffrey Eugenides' novel The Marriage Plot (2011).
- Artist Tessa Boffin quoted sections of Barthes' text in a photo-essay titled A Lover's Distance.
- Claire Denis's 2017 film, Let the Sunshine In, is based on A Lover's Discourse.
- Blythe Roberson's 2019 essay collection How to Date Men When You Hate Men was inspired by and is a "modern response to A Lover's Discourse."
- This reference inspired for Mandarin song with the same name by Sodagreen vocalist Greeny Wu from his 3rd studio album Mallarme's Tuesdays with Karena Lam as French narrator.

== Editions ==
- A Lover's Discourse: Fragments, translated from the French by Richard Howard, Hill and Wang, (1979), ISBN 0-374-52161-1
