= The Flys (British band) =

British punk rock band (1976–1980)

- Origin: Coventry, England
- Genres: Punk rock
- Years active: 1976–1980
- Labels: EMI; Parlophone
- Past members: Dave Freeman; Joe Hughes; Neil O'Connor; Pete King; Graham Deakin; Lyn Dobson

The Flys were a British punk rock band that originally formed in 1976 in Coventry, England. After the self-release of their initial EP, Bunch of Fives, they were signed by EMI Records. With EMI they released the albums Waikiki Beach Refugees and Own. In 1980 they changed labels to Parlophone but soon disbanded.

== History ==
Flys evolved from a band from Coventry, England named Midnight Circus. Midnight Circus was composed of Dave Freeman (guitar, vocals), Joe Hughes (bass), Neil O'Connor (vocals, guitar, keyboard), and "a string of unnamed drummers". In 1976 their manager's brother, Pete King, joined in on drums and Flys were born.

Their career began by regularly opening for the English punk band the Buzzcocks. In late 1977, with Lyn Dobson on saxophone, they self-released the EP Bunch of Five with the tracks "Saturday Sunrise", "Love and a Molotov Cocktail", "Can I Crash Here?", "Me and My Buddies", and "Just For Your Sex". The EP, particularly "Love and a Molotov Cocktail", caught the attention EMI Records, a label that rejected Midnight Circus, who signed them to a deal.

Their initial EMI release came on 20 January 1978, the EP Love and a Molotov Cocktail, which was a release of two of the tracks from Bunch of Five; "Love and a Molotov Cocktail", "Can I Crash Here?", and a new track "Civilisation". "Love and a Molotov Cocktail" garnered some positive reviews, "the first undisputed classic 45 of 1978". In April they released the single "Fun City" with another new track, "E.C.4.", as its b side.

The release of their first LP, Waikiki Beach Refugees, came on 17 October 1978. It contained a rerecording of "Fun City", the future single "Beverley", and the title track "Waikiki Beach Refugees" which EMI had released as a taster single on yellow vinyl in September.

The group spent early 1979 sharing the bills with such acts as The Psychedelic Furs, the Pretenders, and Black Slate. It was around this time that Pete King, who later joined After the Fire, left the band and was replaced on drums by Graham Deakin. In April EMI released a compilation of early punk 45s called The Rare Stuff that contained the three tracks from the EP Love and a Molotov Cocktail.

Their second LP, Own, was released on 11 October 1979 and contained 14 new tracks and was their last release on EMI. Like their debut album and all their singles it did not chart in the UK. The band moved to Parlophone Records and released an EP, Four from the Square which included two songs from the last album, and a final single, "What Will Mother Say?", before disbanding.

In the wake of the departure of Neil O'Connor, who joined his sister Hazel's band, the Flys disbanded in 1980. In 1990 See for Miles Records released the compilation album, Love and a Molotov Cocktail, that Q Magazine described as "angry, angsty, and splenetic guitar tunes with power chords". In 2001 Waikiki Beach Refugees was reissued with eight bonus tracks covering their brief history. Also in 1991, "Love and a Molotov Cocktail" was covered by the German band Die Toten Hosen on their album Learning English, Lesson One. Joe Hughes and David Freeman later worked together again in the short-lived 1980s new wave band The Lover Speaks.

== Influences and musical style ==
Although they were rooted in the 1970s British punk scene and influenced by The Damned and the Buzzcocks their music did not always fit that mold displaying considerable melody. Power pop, and 'half-punk, half pop' is closer to the style of their actual playing.

== Members ==
- Dave Freeman – guitar, vocals
- Joe Hughes – bass
- Neil O'Connor – vocals, guitar, keyboards
- Pete King – drums
- Graham Deakin - drums
- Lyn Dobson – saxophone

== Discography ==
- Bunch of Five EP 1977 (Zama)
- Love and a Molotov Cocktail EP 1978 (EMI)
- Fun City 1978 (EMI)
- Waikiki Beach Refugees 1978 (EMI)
- Waikiki Beach Refugees LP 1978 (EMI)
- Beverly (Edited Version) 1979 (EMI)
- Name Dropping 1979 (EMI)
- We Are The Lucky Ones/Living in the Sticks 1979 (EMI)
- Own LP 1979 (EMI)
- Four From the Square EP 1980 (Parlophone)
- What Will Mother Say 1980 (Parlophone)
