= Clive Westlake =

British songwriter (1932–2000)

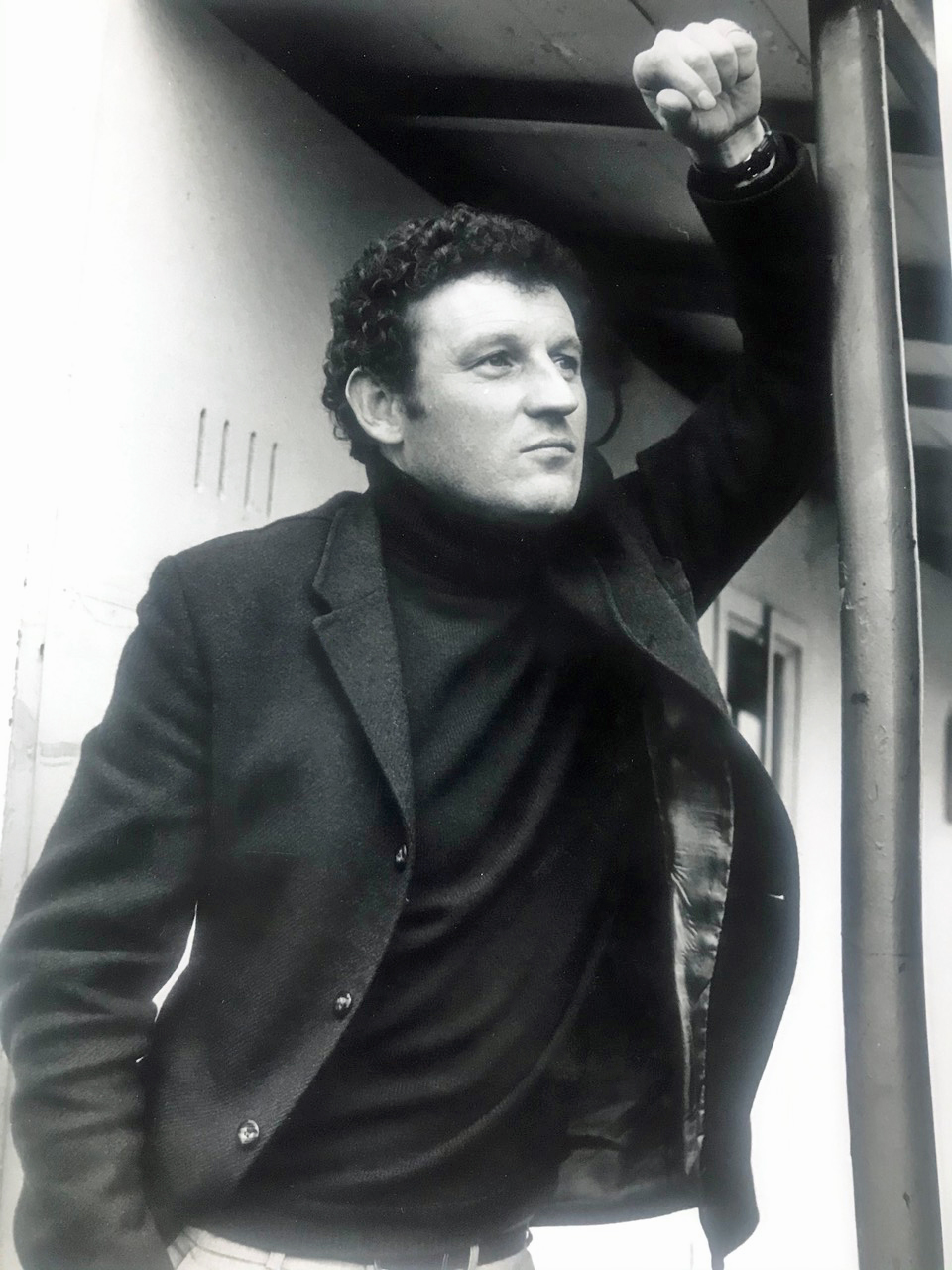

Background information
- Born: Gerald Clive Westlake; 25 December 1932; Wattsville, Monmouthshire, Wales
- Died: 17 June 2000 (aged 67) Pegram, Tennessee, US
- Occupation: Songwriter
- Years active: 1960s–1990s

Gerald Clive Westlake (25 December 1932 – 17 June 2000) was a British songwriter.

== Early life ==
Westlake was born in Wattsville, Monmouthshire, Wales, the son of a coal miner, and studied at the Trinity College of Music in London. He worked as music teacher at Robert Richardson Grammar School, Ryhope, near Sunderland, between 1956 and 1959, before working as a songwriter with music publishers Carlin Music.

== Career ==
Westlake is most associated with songs written for Dusty Springfield, including "Losing You" (co-written with Tom Springfield) and "All I See Is You" (co-written with Ben Weisman) — both of which peaked at no. 9 on the UK Singles Chart, in 1964 and 1966 respectively — and "I Close My Eyes and Count to Ten", which reached no. 4 in the UK in 1968. He also co-wrote "Here I Go Again" with Mort Shuman for The Hollies – a UK no. 4 hit in 1964 – and wrote songs recorded by Shirley Bassey, Vera Lynn, Elvis Presley, Petula Clark, Cilla Black, Tom Jones, Roger Whittaker, Crystal Gayle and others. One of his early efforts was a "B" side for Craig Douglas, "New Boy", issued on Top Rank.

== Personal life and death ==
He moved to Nashville in the 1980s. He died at his home in Pegram, Tennessee, at the age of 67.

He has four children; Christopher, Andrew, Julia and Annika. His daughter Julia lives in Hamburg and is a well-known TV presenter and radio broadcaster in Germany.
