= David Freeman (musician) =

British singer, musician and songwriter (born 1957)

- Born: 25 September 1957 (age 68); Ilford, Essex
- Genres: New wave, punk rock
- Occupations: Singer, musician, songwriter
- Instruments: Vocals, guitar
- Years active: 1970s–present
- Labels: EMI, Harvest, A&M, Discrete

David Freeman (born 25 September 1957) is a British singer, musician and songwriter, best known for being a member of the new wave duo the Lover Speaks during the 1980s.

== Background ==
Freeman was born in Ilford, Essex, on 25 September 1957 and moved to Coventry at the age of 14. He was educated at Bishop Ullathorne Roman Catholic School and left with no qualifications. He bought his first guitar from the wages of his job in the butcher's department of a local supermarket. During the mid-1970s, he began his musical career as guitarist in the band Midnight Circus. In 1976, they evolved into the punk group the Flys, with Freeman providing guitar and vocals. The band recorded a number of singles, two EPs (1977's Bunch of Fives and 1980's Four from the Square) and two studio albums (1978's Waikiki Beach Refugees and 1979's (Own). After the band split up in 1980, Freeman returned to education to acquire an A-level and then went to North London Polytechnic to study English. In 1983, he recorded a cover of the Supremes' 1965 hit "Stop in the Name of Love" with ex-the Flys band member Neil O'Connor as producer (and also on keyboards) and Eddie Case on drums. It was released his debut solo single in the Netherlands through VIP Records. In 1984, Freeman published his own local history book, Looking at Muswell Hill.

In 1985, Freeman teamed up with the Flys' former bassist Joseph Hughes to form the new wave duo the Lover Speaks. The pair began writing material and also recruited the assistance of keyboardist Barry Gilbert. With the help of Dave Stewart of Eurythmics and Chrissie Hynde of the Pretenders, producer Jimmy Iovine received the duo's demo tape and then helped them sign to A&M Records in early 1986. The duo's self-titled debut album, The Lover Speaks, was produced by Iovine and released by A&M in August 1986. The first single "No More 'I Love You's'" reached number 58 in the UK Singles Chart, but the album failed to chart, as did its two following singles, "Tremble Dancing" and "Every Lover's Sign". The latter achieved success in US clubs and reached number 6 on the Billboard Hot Dance/Disco Club Play chart. A book of Freeman's poetry, Voices of Passion, was published by T.L.S. Publishing in 1987. In 1987, the Lover Speaks released a cover of Dusty Springfield's "I Close My Eyes and Count to Ten" as their next single, but it was not a commercial success. They then recorded their second album, The Big Lie, but A&M Records decided not to release it, claiming it was "too uncommercial". Having worked with Alison Moyet in 1986, the Freeman/Hughes-penned "Sleep Like Breathing" was lifted as the fourth and final single from her album Raindancing in September 1987. A duet with Freeman, the song reached number 80 in the UK Singles Chart.

After the Lover Speaks split in 1988, Freeman continued gigging, as well as writing and recording his own songs at Dave Stewart's studio. He recorded around ten albums worth of material with the assistance of various musicians. In 1991, the album Balance was given an independent release under the artist name Free Man Creese. The album saw Freeman team up with former Lotus Eaters drummer Steve Creese, with assistance from Chucho Merchán on bass. Another album, Under a Tall Tree, was given a limited cassette release under the Lover Speaks name, although it did not feature any involvement from Hughes. The same period between 1988 and 1995 also saw Freeman become a father, develop a drug problem and split from the mother of his children. After getting clean, he began gigging again.

In 1995, "No More 'I Love You's'" was covered by Annie Lennox for her album Medusa. It was released as a single in February 1995 and achieved widespread success worldwide. It reached number 2 in the UK Singles Chart and went on to secure Lennox a Grammy Award. In March 1995, Freeman appeared as the opening act for Joe Jackson's concert at the Royal Festival Hall in London. The success of Lennox's cover saw Freeman and Hughes each receive a BMI award in 1996, as well as three Ivor Novello award nominations for the "PRS Most Performed Work", "International Hit of the Year" and "Best Song Musically and Lyrically".

In the face of the renewed interest in the Lover Speaks, Freeman released a large batch of his solo material across six albums in 1996 via the Discrete label. In chronological order, these releases were: Painting as Autobiography (A Love Story), Balance, Going Out Without Makeup, Under a Tall Tree Looking Up, Apart & Together and Melodrama. The material included on these albums was recorded over the course of a decade from 1985 to 1996. In 1997, Freeman began working in Nashville as a freelance songwriter/musician and collaborated with songwriters such as Gary Baker.

The following years saw Freeman spend time studying the piano and singing in choirs. In 2005, he returned to performing with a gig at Earlsdon Cottage in Coventry. In 2010, Freeman's solo version of "No More I Love You's" was released by Discrete as a download-only single on iTunes. In 2014, Discrete released a digital-only compilation album titled No More I Love You's – The Best of David Freeman. Both Freeman and Hughes contributed to the 2015 re-issue of The Lover Speaks album by Cherry Red with interviews and providing song annotations.

== Discography ==
=== Albums ===
- 1996: Painting as Autobiography (A Love Story)
- 1996: Balance
- 1996: Going Out Without Makeup
- 1996: Under a Tall Tree Looking Up
- 1996: Apart & Together
- 1996: Melodrama
- 2014: No More I Love You's – The Best of David Freeman (compilation)

=== Singles ===
- "Stop in the Name of Love" (1983)
- "Sleep Like Breathing" (Alison Moyet with David Freeman, 1987)
- "No More 'I Love You's'" (2010)
