= Medusa (Annie Lennox album) =

Studio album by Annie Lennox
- Released: 6 March 1995
- Studio: The Aquarium (London)
- Genres: Pop; electronic
- Length: 47:11
- Label: RCA
- Producer: Stephen Lipson

Annie Lennox chronology
Diva (1992)	Medusa (1995)	Bare (2003)

Singles from Medusa
- 1. "No More 'I Love You's'" Released: 6 February 1995; 2. "A Whiter Shade of Pale" Released: 29 May 1995; 3. "Waiting in Vain" Released: 18 September 1995; 4. "Something So Right" Released: November 1995

Medusa is the second solo studio album by the Scottish singer Annie Lennox, released on 6 March 1995 by RCA Records. It consists entirely of cover songs. The album entered the UK Albums Chart at number one and peaked in the United States at number 11, spending 60 weeks on the Billboard 200. It has since achieved double platinum status in both the United Kingdom and the United States. As of 2018, Medusa had sold over six million copies worldwide.

The album was nominated for the Grammy Award for Best Pop Vocal Album at the 38th Annual Grammy Awards in 1996. Lennox won the Grammy Award for Best Female Pop Vocal Performance for her work on the first single released from Medusa, "No More 'I Love You's'", which was released in February 1995 to critical acclaim. Entering the UK Singles Charts at number two, the single is Lennox's highest-charting single in the United Kingdom to date. A further three singles were released during 1995 – "A Whiter Shade of Pale", "Waiting in Vain" and "Something So Right".

== Background and recording ==
Like her debut solo album, Diva, Lennox once again worked with record producer Stephen Lipson on Medusa. Four tracks that Lennox recorded for Medusa and were ultimately cut from the album's final take were released elsewhere. B-sides releases include a version of "Heaven", originally by The Psychedelic Furs, a recording of Joni Mitchell's "Ladies of the Canyon", and a cover of Blondie's "(I'm Always Touched by Your) Presence, Dear". Lennox also recorded a version of The Sugarcubes' "Mama", which was included on the 1995 all-female compilation Ain't Nothin' But a She Thing.

Lennox explains the origins of the album in the liner notes:

This album contains a selection of songs I have been drawn to for all kinds of reasons. They were not chosen with any particular theme or concept in mind—the method was more by instinct than by design. The work undertaken was truly a labour of love for me and I feel privileged to have been given this opportunity.

Regarding Medusa and the nature of its cover versions, Metro Weekly claimed that "cover albums are notoriously hit and miss; even the best artists can sometimes stumble when straying from their original material and trying to reinvent somebody else's. Lennox is a masterful interpreter of other artists' tunes, getting to the heart of the songs and delivering one stunning vocal performance after another. Lennox imbues each of these songs her own distinct flavor. Even though the songs come from different eras and there is a vast stylistic diversity, the album is tightly cohesive."

== Release and promotion ==
Lennox performing "No More 'I Love You's'" on the Late Show with David Letterman, May 1995

Medusa was released in March 1995 and became a "substantial hit" for Lennox, with music commentators claiming that the album was a "worthy successor" to her debut solo album, Diva which was released in 1992. Whilst Medusa did not match the acclaim and success that Diva achieved, the album was still well received, becoming a substantial commercial success. It reached number one on the UK Albums Chart and in Canada, and reached number eleven on the US Billboard 200 charts, achieving double-platinum in all three countries. Medusa was a Top 10 album over Europe and in other parts of the world. Both "No More 'I Love You's'" and "Whiter Shade of Pale" were included on Lennox's 2009 greatest-hits album The Annie Lennox Collection. As of 2018, Medusa had sold over six million copies worldwide.

The album yielded four singles in the United Kingdom: "No More 'I Love You's'" (which entered the UK Singles Chart at number 2, becoming Lennox's highest-peaking solo single), "A Whiter Shade of Pale", "Waiting in Vain" and "Something So Right". Metro Weekly claimed that "The Lover Speaks' recording of "No More 'I Love You's'" did no more than graze the lower reaches of the pop chart, and was soon forgotten" until Lennox recorded and released the track as a single, claiming that the song's "idiosyncrasies play right into her [Lennox] strengths. Lennox and producer Stephen Lipson turn the inventive composition into a piece of epic grandeur, with Lennox delivering a dazzling vocal performance, arguably the finest of her career." "No More 'I Love You's'" was nominated for an MTV Video Music Award for Best Female Video, and Lennox, at the 1995 Grammy Awards, won the award for Best Female Pop Vocal Performance for the song.

Citing the poor success of the three singles in the American music market that followed "No More 'I Love You's'", Metro Weekly argued that Lennox may have achieved considerably more success in the singles markets "if she'd released a couple of the catchier up-tempo tracks instead of all ballads".

The album was nominated for Best Pop Album at the Grammy Awards of 1996, losing to Turbulent Indigo by Joni Mitchell. Lennox took home the Best Female Pop Vocal Performance award for her work on the first single, "No More 'I Love You's'". This album was re-released in late 1995 in a double jewel case containing the album Medusa and a nine-track bonus CD featuring the studio version of Paul Simon's "Something So Right" (with Simon guesting on vocals and guitar) and eight tracks recorded live from the concert in Central Park: "Money Can't Buy It", "Legend in My Living Room", the Eurythmics singles "Who's That Girl?", "You Have Placed a Chill in My Heart" and "Here Comes the Rain Again", along with "Why", "Little Bird" and "Walking on Broken Glass".

== Commercial performance ==
In her native Scotland, it debuted at number one on the national albums chart, spending a combined total of forty four weeks within the Scottish Top 100 Albums Chart. Likewise, in the United Kingdom, it also debuted atop the UK Albums Chart, spending a total of fifty-four weeks within the UK Top 100. Additionally, it debuted at number thirty-eight on the Official Vinyl Albums Chart in the United Kingdom in March 2018. Medusa peaked at number eleven on the US Billboard 200 Albums Chart, spending a total of sixty weeks on the US Billboard 200.

Elsewhere, the album debuted at number one in Canada and number two in both Austria and Italy. It reached the top ten in a number of territories such as Germany, Norway, Sweden, Spain, Portugal and New Zealand. Since its release, Medusa has sold over 6 million copies worldwide as of 2018, and achieved double platinum certification in both the United Kingdom and the United States. The album was also awarded double platinum status in both Canada and Ireland, indicating sales in excess of both 200,000 and 30,000 copies respectively. It achieved Gold certification status in Australia, Argentina, Austria, France, Germany and Spain.

== Awards and accolades ==
Lead single "No More 'I Love You's'" won the Grammy Award for Best Female Pop Vocal Performance at the 1996 Grammy Awards and was nominated for Best British Single at the 1996 Brit Awards. Despite missing out on the award for Best British Single, Lennox won the award for Best British Female for the second time.

Year	Nominee / work	Award	Result
1996	Medusa	Best Pop Vocal Album	Nominated
1996	"No More 'I Love You's'"	Best Pop Vocal Performance – Female	Won

== Critical reception ==
Professional ratings
Review scores
Source	Rating
AllMusic	2.5/5 stars
Entertainment Weekly	C−
Knoxville News Sentinel	4/5 stars
Los Angeles Times	2.5/4 stars
Music Week	5/5 stars
The New York Times	(mixed)
Rolling Stone	3.5/5 stars
Smash Hits	3/5 stars

Professional reviews for Medusa ranged from favourable to hostile. AllMusic said critics "savaged" the album upon release: Trouser Press characterised Lennox's interpretations of classic songs as "obvious", "milquetoast" and "willfully wrongheaded". Reviewer Ira Robbins said, "The only song here that benefits from her ministrations is 'No More "I Love You's"', a minor 1986 hit for Britain's otherwise forgotten The Lover Speaks, and that's only by dint of the original's obscurity."

Rolling Stone gave the album a mixed review:

Annie Lennox called her justifiably popular solo debut Diva, but it's actually on the follow-up effort Medusa that she really starts acting like one. This wildly uneven album of cover versions starts with perhaps its highest point — a truly wonderful interpretation of "No More 'I Love You's'", a relatively obscure British hit by the Lover Speaks. Unfortunately, Lennox doesn't work the same magic with more familiar material like Al Green's "Take Me to the River" and Procol Harum's "A Whiter Shade of Pale".

== Track listing ==
No.	Title	Writer(s)	Original artist(s)	Length
1.	"No More 'I Love You's'"	David Freeman; Joseph Hughes	The Lover Speaks	4:51
2.	"Take Me to the River"	Al Green; Mabon Hodges	Al Green	3:31
3.	"A Whiter Shade of Pale"	Keith Reid; Gary Brooker	Procol Harum	5:17
4.	"Don't Let It Bring You Down"	Neil Young	Neil Young	3:36
5.	"Train in Vain"	Joe Strummer; Mick Jones	The Clash	4:38
6.	"I Can't Get Next to You"	Barrett Strong; Norman Whitfield	The Temptations	3:09
7.	"Downtown Lights"	Paul Buchanan	The Blue Nile	6:42
8.	"Thin Line Between Love and Hate"	Richard Poindexter; Robert Poindexter; Jackie Members	The Persuaders	4:53
9.	"Waiting in Vain"	Bob Marley	Bob Marley and the Wailers	5:40
10.	"Something So Right"	Paul Simon	Paul Simon	3:54

Japanese edition bonus track
No.	Title	Writer(s)	Original artist(s)	Length
11.	"Heaven"	Richard Butler; Tim Butler	The Psychedelic Furs	4:57

Limited edition bonus disc – Live in Central Park
No.	Title	Writer(s)	Length
1.	"Money Can't Buy It"	Annie Lennox	4:45
2.	"Legend in My Living Room"	Lennox; Peter-John Vettese	3:48
3.	"Who's That Girl?"	Lennox; David Stewart	4:44
4.	"You Have Placed a Chill in My Heart"	Lennox; Stewart	5:19
5.	"Little Bird"	Lennox	5:27
6.	"Walking on Broken Glass"	Lennox	4:01
7.	"Here Comes the Rain Again"	Lennox; Stewart	5:59
8.	"Why"	Lennox	5:17
9.	"Something So Right" (studio version) (featuring Paul Simon)	Simon	3:50

== Personnel ==
Credits adapted from the liner notes of Medusa.

=== Musicians ===
- Annie Lennox – all vocals, keyboards, flute
- Stephen Lipson – programming, guitar, keyboards, bass guitar
- Marius de Vries – keyboards, programming
- Luís Jardim – percussion, bass guitar
- Peter-John Vettese, Andy Richards, Matthew Cooper – keyboards
- Tony Pastor – guitar
- Neil Conti, Dann Gillen – drums
- Doug Wimbish – bass guitar
- Judd Lander, Mark Feltham – harmonica
- Pandit Dinesh – tablas
- Kirampal Singh – santoor
- James McNally – accordion
- Danny D, Steve Sidelnyk – additional programming
- Anne Dudley – orchestral, brass and string arrangement

=== Technical ===
- Stephen Lipson – production
- Heff Moraes – engineering, mixing
- Marius de Vries – pre-production

=== Artwork ===
- Laurence Stevens – sleeve design
- Bettina Rheims – photography

== Live in Central Park ==
DVD cover

Although no tour was held to promote this album, Lennox played a one-off concert in Central Park in New York City on 9 September 1995. This was subsequently released on videotape as Annie Lennox in the Park and on DVD as Annie Lennox Live in Central Park.

=== Information ===
- Director: Joe Dyer
- Recorded: Live in Central Park Summerstage, New York City, 9 September 1995
- Release date: December 1995 (video); December 2000 (DVD)
- Label: BMG/Arista
- Runtime: 90 minutes

=== Track listing ===
1. "Money Can't Buy It" (Lennox)
2. "Legend in My Living Room" (Lennox, Vettese)
3. "Walking on Broken Glass" (Lennox)
4. "No More 'I Love You's'" (Hughes, Freeman)
5. "Who's That Girl?" (Lennox, Stewart)
6. "You Have Placed a Chill in My Heart" (Lennox, Stewart)
7. "Waiting in Vain" (Marley)
8. "I Love You Like a Ball and Chain" (Lennox, Stewart)
9. "Little Bird" (Lennox)
10. "Sweet Dreams (Are Made of This)" (Lennox, Stewart)
11. "Train in Vain" (Jones, Strummer)
12. "Why" (Lennox)

Promotional video clips

13. "No More 'I Love You's'" (Hughes, Freeman)
14. "A Whiter Shade of Pale" (Reid, Brooker, Fisher)
15. "Waiting in Vain" (Marley)
16. "Something So Right" (Simon)

== Charts ==
=== Weekly charts ===
Weekly chart performance for Medusa
Chart (1995)	Peak position
Australian Albums (ARIA)	5
Austrian Albums (Ö3 Austria)	2
Belgian Albums (Ultratop Flanders)	8
Belgian Albums (Ultratop Wallonia)	3
Canada Top Albums/CDs (RPM)	1
Danish Albums (Hitlisten)	6
Dutch Albums (Album Top 100)	7
European Albums (Music & Media)	3
Finnish Albums (Suomen virallinen lista)	10
French Albums (SNEP)	5
German Albums (Offizielle Top 100)	4
Hungarian Albums (MAHASZ)	11
Irish Albums (IFPI)	5
Italian Albums (FIMI)	2
Japanese Albums (Oricon)	50
New Zealand Albums (RMNZ)	5
Norwegian Albums (VG-lista)	4
Portuguese Albums (AFP)	6
Scottish Albums (Official Charts)	1
Spanish Albums (AFYVE)	5
Swedish Albums (Sverigetopplistan)	4
Swiss Albums (Schweizer Hitparade)	6
UK Albums (Official Charts)	1
US Billboard 200	11

=== Year-end charts ===
Year-end chart performance for Medusa
Chart (1995)	Position
Australian Albums (ARIA)	93
Austrian Albums (Ö3 Austria)	24
Belgian Albums (Ultratop Flanders)	60
Belgian Albums (Ultratop Wallonia)	17
Canada Top Albums/CDs (RPM)	5
Dutch Albums (Album Top 100)	25
European Albums (Music & Media)	17
French Albums (SNEP)	46
German Albums (Offizielle Top 100)	30
New Zealand Albums (RMNZ)	30
Swedish Albums (Sverigetopplistan)	56
Swiss Albums (Schweizer Hitparade)	26
UK Albums (OCC)	14
US Billboard 200	50

== Certifications ==
Certifications for Medusa
Region	Certification	Certified units/sales
Argentina (CAPIF)	Gold	30,000^{^}
Australia (ARIA)	Gold	35,000^{^}
Austria (IFPI Austria)	Gold	25,000^{*}
Canada (Music Canada)	2× Platinum	200,000^{^}
France (SNEP)	Gold	100,000^{*}
Germany (BVMI)	Gold	250,000^{^}
Ireland (IRMA)	2× Platinum	30,000^{^}
Italy (FIMI)	Gold	50,000^{*}
Norway (IFPI Norway)	Gold	25,000^{*}
Poland (ZPAV)	Gold	50,000^{*}
Spain (Promusicae)	Gold	50,000^{^}
Sweden (GLF)	Gold	50,000^{^}
Switzerland (IFPI Switzerland)	Gold	25,000^{^}
United Kingdom (BPI)	2× Platinum	600,000^{^}
United States (RIAA)	2× Platinum	2,000,000^{^}
Summaries
Europe (IFPI)	2× Platinum	2,000,000^{*}
^{*} Sales figures based on certification alone.^{^} Shipments figures based on certification alone.
