= Der Kommissar – The CBS Recordings =

Compilation album by After the Fire
- Released: 31 January 2005
- Genre: New wave; Christian rock
- Length: 159:19
- Label: Edsel

After the Fire chronology
Der Kommissar (1982)	Der Kommissar – The CBS Recordings (2005)	Live at Greenbelt (2006)

Der Kommissar – The CBS Recordings is a pop rock, power pop and new wave music compilation album by British rock band After the Fire released in 2005. It is essentially a reissue of the band's three album output for CBS. The collection also benefits from bonus tracks associated with each of the original album recordings.

== Track listing ==
All tracks by After the Fire

- Disk 1 - Total time 79:45
  - Laser Love
1. "Laser Love" – 3:29
2. "Joy" – 3:17
3. "Take Me Higher" – 4:30
4. "Life in the City" – 4:01
5. "Suspended Animation" – 4:21
6. "Like The Power of a Jet" – 3:07
7. "One Rule For You" – 3:25
8. "Time To Think" – 3:29
9. "Timestar" – 3:39
10. "Check It Out" – 3:22
  - Bonus tracks - associated with "Laser Love"
11. "Your Love Is Alive" (Bonus track) – 3:14
  - 80f
12. "Listen To Me" – 3:24
13. "1980-F" – 2:34
14. "Love Will Always Make You Cry" – 3:34
15. "Can You Face It?" – 3:18
16. "Who's Gonna Love You (When You’re Old And Fat And Ugly)" – 4:10
17. "Starflight" – 4:18
18. "Wild West Show" – 3:34
19. "Billy, Billy" – 4:37
20. "It's High Fashion" – 3:11
21. "Why Can't We Be Friends?" – 2:51
22. "Joanne" – 4:20
- Disk 2 - Total time 79:34
  - Bonus track - associated with "80F"
1. "Every Mother's Son" (Bonus track) – 2:38
  - Batteries not included
2. "Short Change" – 3:20
3. "Frozen Rivers" – 3:31
4. "Sometimes" – 3:09
5. "Sailing Ship" – 3:55
6. "I Don't Understand Your Love" – 2:51
7. "The Stranger" – 3:44
8. "Rich Boys" – 3:02
9. "Carry Me Home" – 3:22
10. "Dancing in the Shadows" – 3:03
11. "Space Walking" – 3:11
12. "Gina" – 1:37
13. "Stuck in Paris (Nowhere To Go)" – 2:45
14. "Bright Lights" – 3:35
  - Bonus tracks - associated with "Batteries not included"
15. "Nobody Else But You" (Bonus track) – 3:14
16. "Starflight" (live) (Bonus track) – 4:51
17. "Take Me Higher" (live) (Bonus track) – 7:47
18. "One Rule For You" (live) (Bonus track) – 4:30
19. "Billy, Billy" (live) (Bonus track) – 6:48
20. "Der Kommissar" (Bonus track) – 4:08
21. "Starflight" (Re-worked Bonus track) – 4:33

== Personnel ==
=== Band ===
- Peter Banks – Hammond C3, mini Moog, Crumar Multiman, piano, vocals
- Andy Piercy – electric guitar, acoustic guitar, bass guitar, lead vocals, tambourine
- Nick Battle – bass guitar, vocals
- Ivor Twidell – drums
- John Russell – electric guitar
- Bob Price – electric guitar, acoustic guitar, percussion, backing vocals
- Pete King – drums

== Release details ==
- 2005, UK, Edsel MEDCD 757, released 31 January 2005, double CD (with bonus tracks)
