= Signs of Change =

Studio album by After the Fire
- Released: April 1978
- Recorded: 1977
- Studios: ICC Studios, Eastbourne, England
- Genres: Progressive rock, Christian rock
- Length: 42:04
- Labels: Rapid, RoughMix

After the Fire chronology
Signs of Change (1978)	Laser Love (1979)

Signs of Change is a progressive rock album by After the Fire. Released 1978, after attempting to get a record contract, the band self produced their debut at a time when this was uncommon. To their credit, it sold out its initial 2,000 copy run within two weeks with limited media publicity. The band went on to change their musical direction, leaving behind most of the progressive stylistic markers and redefining themselves as new wave. With a contract from Epic they went on to more success throughout the 1980s.

They recorded mainly at ICC Studios in Eastbourne, England (engineers: Andy Kidd and Dave Aston).

== Track listing ==
=== Original LP ===
- Disc - Total time 42:04

Side 1

1. "Dance of the Marionette" – 7:00
2. "Back to the Light" – 4:30
3. "Now That I've Found" – 8:10

Side 2

1. "Signs of Change" – 8:04
2. "Jigs" – 2:58
3. "Pilgrim" – 11:22

=== CD ===
- Disc - Total time 74:46
1. "Dance of the Marionette" – 7:00
2. "Back to the Light" – 4:30
3. "Now That I've Found" – 8:10
4. "Signs of Change" – 8:04
5. "Jigs" – 2:58
6. "Pilgrim" – 11:22
  Bonus tracks (available only on the CD):
7. "Samaritan Woman" – 11:01
8. "Dreamaway" – 9:50
9. "Hallelujah" – 6:31
10. "Back to the Light" – 5:09 (demo version)

== Release details ==
- 1977, UK, Rapid Records, released 1978, LP
- 2005, UK, RoughMix, released 3 January 2005, CD (with bonus tracks)

== Personnel ==
Band

- Peter Banks – Hammond C3, mini Moog, Crumar Multiman, piano, vocals
- Andy Piercy – electric guitars, acoustic guitars, lead vocals, tambourines
- Nick Battle – bass guitar, vocals
- Ivor Twidell – drums

Others (on bonus tracks)

- Robin Childs – bass guitar
- Ian Adamson – drums
