= Laser Love (album) =

1979 studio album by After the Fire

Studio album by After the Fire
- Released: 21 September 1979
- Recorded: July–August 1978
- Studios: Record Plant, NYC
- Genre: New wave
- Length: 38:17
- Label: CBS
- Producers: Muff Winwood (Tracks A1, A3, A5, B1, B3-B4); Rhett Davies (Co-producer on A1, B3); Rupert Hine (Tracks A2, B2); After the Fire (Track A4); John Leckie (Track B5)

After the Fire chronology
Signs of Change (1978)	Laser Love (1979)	80-f (1980)

Laser Love is the second album by UK band After the Fire. Released in 1979, the album showcased more of a new wave approach, including much shorter songs than had been featured on the band's more progressive rock-oriented debut album, Signs of Change. It was produced primarily by Muff Winwood.

The album includes the band's only top 40 and biggest hit in the UK, "One Rule for You". Laser Love peaked at No. 57 on the UK Albums Chart.

== Critical reception ==
Professional ratings
Review scores
Source	Rating
AllMusic	2/5 stars

The Bristol Evening Post called Laser Love a "pleasant album which showcases After the Fire's rich music and melodic instrumental work."

== Track listing ==
Side one

1. "Laser Love" (Andy Piercy, Peter "Memory" Banks) (3:28)
2. "Joy" (Banks, Piercy, John Russell, Ivor Twidell) (3:17)
3. "Take Me Higher" (Piercy, Banks) (4:31)
4. "Life in the City" (Piercy, Banks) (4:13)
5. "Suspended Animation" (Piercy, Banks) (4:52)

Side two

1. "Like the Power of a Jet" (Piercy, Banks) (3:07)
2. "One Rule for You" (Piercy, Banks) (3:24)
3. "Time to Think" (Piercy, Banks) (3:28)
4. "Timestar" (Banks) (4:36)
5. "Check It Out" (Piercy, Banks) (3:21)
