= Pete King (British musician) =

British musician (1958–1987)

- Born: 13 August 1958
- Died: 15 July 1987 (aged 28)
- Genres: Rock, new wave, progressive rock
- Occupation: Musician
- Instrument: Drums
- Years active: 1976–1987
- Formerly of: After the Fire, BAP, the Flys

Pete King (13 August 1958 – 15 July 1987) was a British musician.

The drummer Pete King played in the British punk band the Flys, then in 1980 joined South London/Surrey based new wave band 'The Rayders' (Graham Smith, Alan Barnes and Kevin Hogg), before joining After the Fire. King remained in After the Fire throughout most of the band's brief heyday, performing on their biggest stateside hit, "Der Kommissar", before he became the replacement of Jan Dix in the German rock band BAP in 1986.

He died in 1987 of testicular cancer. He was replaced by Jürgen Zöller. The song "Flüchtig" (literally: "fleeting") was released as a tribute to him on BAP's 1988 album Da Capo. King also briefly filled in for Electric Light Orchestra's regular drummer Bev Bevan on their 'Time' Tour in 1982 as Bevan was ill and therefore unable to tour at the time.
