= Der Kommissar (album) =

Compilation album by After the Fire
- Released: 1982
- Genre: Rock
- Label: Epic; Collectible

After the Fire chronology
| Batteries Not Included (1982) | Der Kommissar (1982) | Der Kommissar – The CBS Recordings (2005) |

Der Kommissar is a compilation album released by the band After the Fire in 1982, featuring the new title track, an English-language cover of a minor Falco hit from earlier that year. With the exception of "Der Kommissar", the singles featured on this compilation were originally from After the Fire's three studio albums recorded for the CBS label: Laser Love, 80-F, and Batteries Not Included. In the US, the album was released simply as ATF by Epic Records on LP and audio cassette with a different track list. It had been released in 2001 on CD by Collectables Records again with a different track list. The U.K. and European CD release follows the original track list. "Der Kommissar" became the band's biggest stateside hit song, cracking the top 10.

== International release track listing ==
Side one

1. "Der Kommissar" – 4:07
2. "Who's Gonna Love You (When You Are Old Fat and Ugly)" – 4:05
3. "Frozen Rivers" – 3:36
4. "Joy" – 3:17
5. "Dancing in the Shadows" – 3:01
6. "Billy Billy" – 4:40

Side two

1. "1980-F" – 2:32
2. "Rich Boys" – 3:02
3. "Starflight" – 4:13
4. "Laser Love" – 3:28
5. "Love Will Always Make You Cry" – 3:30
6. "One Rule for You" – 3:24
7. "Sailing Ship" – 3:56

== US release track listing ==
Side one

1. "Laser Love" – 3:28
2. "One Rule for You" – 3:24
3. "Dancing in the Shadows" – 3:01
4. "Sometimes" – 3:07
5. "Sailing Ship" – 3:55
6. "Carry Me Home" – 3:22

Side two

1. "Frozen Rivers" – 3:33
2. "Love Will Always Make You Cry" – 3:32
3. "Starflight" – 3:46
4. "Der Kommissar" – 5:43
5. "1980-F" – 2:32

== 2001 US CD reissue track listing ==
1. "Laser Love" – 3:26
2. "One Rule for You" – 3:17
3. "Dancing in the Shadows" – 3:14
4. "Sometimes" – 3:06
5. "Sailing Ship" – 3:53
6. "Carry Me Home" – 3:21
7. "Frozen Rivers" – 3:33
8. "Love Will Always Make You Cry" – 3:33
9. "Starflight" – 4:32
10. "Der Kommissar" – 5:43
11. "1980-F" – 2:32
12. "Der Kommissar" (Dub) – 4:51
13. "Joy" – 3:18
