= After the Fire =

British rock band

- Also known as: ATF
- Origin: London, England
- Genres: Rock; new wave; progressive rock
- Years active: 1972–1982; 2004–2013
- Labels: Rapid; CBS; Epic; RoughMix
- Past members: Peter Banks; John Russell; Ian Niblo; Tim Turner; Rob Halligan; Matthew Russell; Keith Smith; Bob Price; Andy Piercy; Nick Battle; John Leach; Steve Irving; Ivor Twidell; Pete King; Nick Brotherwood; Ian Adamson; Robin Childs

After the Fire (or ATF) were a British rock band formed in London in 1972. Initially playing progressive rock, they shifted to a new wave sound by the late 1970s and signed to CBS Records. They are best known in the United States for "Der Kommissar", an English-language cover of the Falco hit that peaked at number five on the Billboard Hot 100 in 1983. In the United Kingdom, they had earlier success with the single "One Rule for You". The band disbanded in December 1982, shortly before "Der Kommissar" reached its US chart peak.

== History ==
Keyboard player Peter Banks originally formed the band in 1972 in London, England. After the Fire then went through several personnel changes before settling on Banks, guitarist and vocalist Andy Piercy, bassist Nick Battle, and drummer Ivor Twidell. This line-up enjoyed local success in London, and released an album, Signs of Change, in 1978, on their own label. Having become a highly priced collector's item, it was reissued on CD in 2004 with several bonus tracks. At this time, the band's sound was similar to that of bands like Genesis and Yes.

The band were explicit about their Christian faith, with the band's name derived from the biblical passage 1 Kings 19:11–13. They started the new wave synth pop movement at the time most bands in their caliber were mostly punk and pub rock. When they became more successful, their sound was more AOR radio friendly.

After Battle left, Piercy switched to bass, and, after a short period as a three-piece (former member, Bob Price, rejoined as a touring guitarist), John Russell joined on guitar. The group signed to CBS, and released their second album, Laser Love, in 1979, which marked the band's move towards the new wave, with shorter pop rock tracks. Twidell left the band to seek a career as a frontman and Nick Brotherwood took over briefly, after the album Laser Love was recorded. Banks changed his name to "Memory" Banks around this time. As these changes took place, After the Fire's single "One Rule for You" entered the UK Singles Chart.

The first version of 80-f was turned down by CBS resulting in the early departure of Brotherwood. The band, now with Pete King (formerly of the Flys) on drums, were assigned a new producer who re-worked some of the original album tracks and re-visited tracks that had been left off Laser Love. Neither single charted in the UK but 1980-f gained popularity, like the band, in other European countries.

Batteries Not Included was released in 1982 without fanfare, and the singles received little UK airplay. They came back into the UK spotlight when their English-language cover of Austrian musician Falco's song "Der Kommissar" reached the US top 10 in 1983, though it only just made the top 50 in the United Kingdom. This was followed by the release of their first and only US album, ATF, a compilation of their UK albums.

This success came too late, and growing musical differences eventually caused the band to split in 1982. Piercy was looking to leave during the recording sessions which led to the single "Der Kommissar". Although "Der Kommissar", which had already become a hit in Canada, finally took hold in the American charts, CBS tried to get the band back together without success. All rights to the band name were signed over by Banks to Piercy and CBS.

Piercy went back into the studios to rerecord "One Rule" and "Dancing in the Shadows", the latter being released as a single and charting in the US with some success. Piercy started work on a new album called Free Heat. The album was recorded across the UK in various studios including The Manor and The Town House. The only single from the sessions was "8 Ball in the Top Pocket" (b-side "Deep Waters Still Run"), released on 7-inch and 12-inch. The latter also contained "One Down for the Highway", was deleted before release. Musicians who worked on the album with Piercy and Mal Pope included Roger Taylor (Queen), Henry Spinetti & Bob Jenkins – drums, John Giblin & Andy – bass, Alan Murphy & John Russell – guitar, Adrian Lee – keys. Mal and John Russell both did some backing vocals.

The album consisted of the following tracks: "8 Ball in the Top Pocket", "Young Love", "Terry", "Stop Go", "4th Street Room 101", "Jewel in the Night", "We Gotta Get Out of This Place", "Young and Wild", "One Down for the Highway", and "Deep Waters Still Run". CBS had planned to make it the company's first release on CD. Work on the album had begun to get hard, the demos were not turning into the tracks Piercy wished for. Then towards the end of recording, the producer, John Eden, told Piercy that he "didn't like" any of the styles, bands or writers he was aspiring to. The whole project was dropped by CBS and was never released. Piercy recalled: "I think they could have been good but I now realize I didn't get the production help and direction I needed at the time."

In January 2007, Smith's departure from the group was announced. The vocals at their first gig in Harrow after Smith's departure were handled by Pete Banks and Russell and gave the band an "authentic" vocal style. Before Smith's departure, there had been plans to re-enter the recording studio. A band biography, in union with a Christian publishing house, with the working title of Short Change, by a band associate was shelved in 2007. In May 2008, the band announced the arrival of Tim Turner as drummer, fresh from Titian Red. For their autumn 2008 tour, the band teamed up with singer–songwriter Rob Halligan, who not only fronted the band (lead vocals and guitar), but also played some of his own material during the sets. Halligan also recorded a cover of the band's song "Carry Me Home" on his 2008 album, Best Thing That Happened. The band continued to perform, with an annual mini tour until 2013. As of 2021 their last performance was at the Jesus Centre in Coventry as the opening act for Rob Halligan's Love Come Down album launch on 21 November 2014.

== Members ==
After the Fire personnel
(1972–1973)	(1973–1975)	(1975–1977)	(1977–1978)
Peter Banks — keyboards, vocals; Bob Price — guitar, harp, vocals; John Leach — bass guitar, vocals; Ian Adamson — drums	Peter Banks — keyboards, vocals; Andy Piercy — guitar, vocals; Steve Irving — bass guitar, vocals; Ian Adamson — drums	Peter Banks — keyboards, vocals; Andy Piercy — guitar, vocals; Robin Childs — bass guitar, vocals; Ian Adamson — drums	Peter Banks — keyboards, vocals; Andy Piercy — guitar, vocals; Nick Battle — bass guitar, violin, vocals; Ivor Twidell — drums
(1978–1979)	(1979)	(1979)	(1979–1983)
Peter Banks — keyboards, vocals; Bob Price — guitar, vocals; Andy Piercy — bass guitar, vocals; Ivor Twidell — drums	Peter Banks — keyboards, vocals; Andy Piercy — bass guitar, vocals; John Russell — guitar, vocals; Ivor Twidell — drums	Peter Banks — keyboards, vocals; Andy Piercy — bass guitar, vocals; John Russell — guitar, vocals; Nick Brotherwood — drums	Peter Banks — keyboards, vocals; Andy Piercy — bass guitar, vocals; John Russell — guitar, vocals; Pete King — drums
(2004–2006)	(2007–2008)	(2008–2013)
Peter Banks — keyboards, vocals; John Russell — guitar, vocals; Keith Smith — vocals; Ian Niblo — bass guitar; Matthew Russell — drums	Peter Banks — keyboards, vocals; John Russell — guitar, vocals; Ian Niblo — bass guitar; Matthew Russell — drums, vocals	Peter Banks — keyboards, vocals; John Russell — guitar, vocals; Ian Niblo — bass guitar; Tim Turner — drums; Rob Halligan — vocals, guitar

== Discography ==
- Signs of Change (1978)
- Laser Love (1979)
- 80-f (1980)
- Batteries Not Included (1982)
- Der Kommissar (1982)
- AT2F (2006)
- Radio Sessions 1979–1981 (2009)
