= I Close My Eyes and Count to Ten =

Single by Dusty Springfield
- B-side: "No Stranger Am I"
- Released: July 1968
- Recorded: 1 June 1968
- Genre: Pop
- Label: Philips Records
- Songwriter: Clive Westlake

Dusty Springfield singles chronology
"What's It Gonna Be" (1968)	"I Close My Eyes and Count to Ten" (1968)	""I Will Come to You" (UK) "Son of a Preacher Man" (US)" (1968)

"I Close My Eyes and Count to Ten" is a song written by Clive Westlake and recorded by British singer Dusty Springfield.

== Release ==
Recorded on 1 June 1968 at Chappel Studios in London, "I Close My Eyes..." was released that August to reach No. 4 in the UK Singles Chart, where it ranks as one of Springfield's biggest hits: of her solo singles only "I Just Don't Know What to Do With Myself" (No. 3) and "You Don't Have to Say You Love Me" (No. 1) outrank "I Close My Eyes..." while "I Only Want to Be with You" matches its No. 4 peak (although "I Only Want to Be With You" charted for substantially longer than "I Close My Eyes...", with eighteen weeks as opposed to twelve).

In the US, "I Close My Eyes..." was Springfield's final release on the Phillips label, Springfield having signed in June 1968 to have Atlantic Records be her US label of release as of that August; consequently the single was virtually ignored in the US, reaching No. 122 on the Bubbling Under Hot 100 Singles chart in Billboard. (The US release of "I Close My Eyes..." replaced the UK B-side "No Stranger Am I" with Springfield's rendition of "La Bamba".)

Cash Box said that it is an "exceptional lovesong with arrangements that should excite listener response" and with "classical orchestration and a brilliant performance from Dusty Springfield."

== Notable cover versions ==
- Fausto Leali as "Chiudo gli occhi e conto a sei" No. 20 (Italy) (1968)
