= No More Fish, No Fishermen =

Song by Finest Kind

from the album Heart's Delight
- Published: 1996
- Released: 1999
- Genre: Folk music
- Label: Fallen Angle Music
- Songwriter(s): Shelley Posen

No More Fish, No Fishermen is a song whose lyrics were composed by Canadian folklorist and singer Shelley Posen, about the demise of the Newfoundland cod fishery in the 1990s. Although it was written in 1996, it is often assumed to be a traditional song. The song is based upon "Coal Not Dole" by Kay Sutcliffe (about the death of the coal industry in northern England), which itself is written to John Goss' tune for the Victorian-era christmas carol "See Amid the Winter's Snow."

Posen recorded "No More Fish, No Fishermen" with the group Finest Kind (on their CD Heart's Delight) as an a capella, three-part vocal; and on his solo CD The Old Songs' Home, with a jangle pop musical arrangement reminiscent of The Byrds. It has since been recorded and performed by many folk singers all over the English-speaking world.

== Covers ==
- Finest Kind, Heart's Delight
- Shelley Posen, The Old Songs' Home
- Adam Miller, The Orphan Train and Other Reminiscences
- Johnny Collins, Now & Then
- Bill Garrett & Sue Lothrop, Red Shoes (2003)
- David Coffin, Last trip home (2009)
