= St Luke's Church, Chelsea =

Coordinates: 51.4897°N 0.1694°W

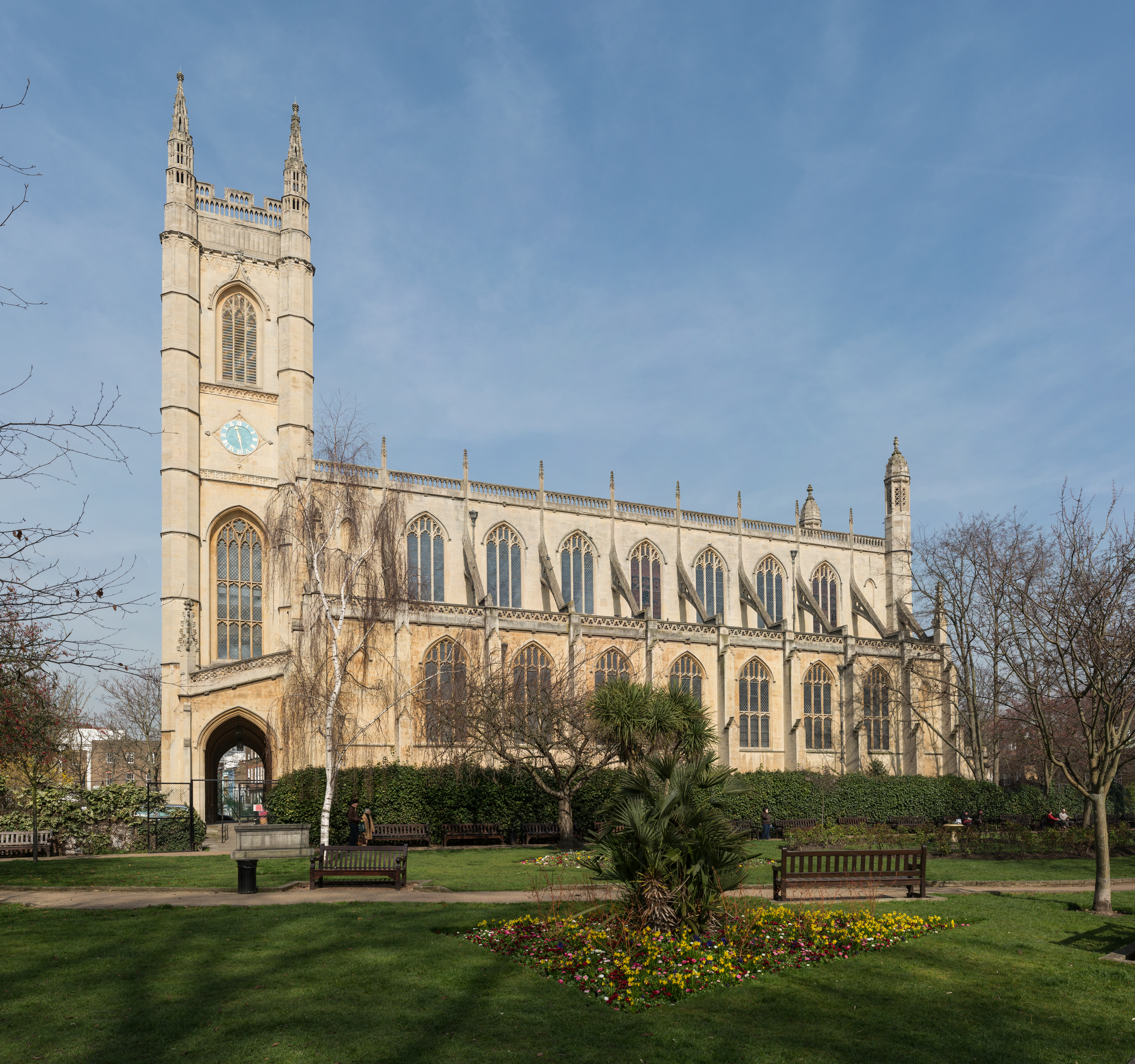
- St Luke's Church, Chelsea
- OS grid reference: TQ 27193 78332
- Location: Sydney Street, Chelsea, London, SW3 6NH
- Country: England
- Denomination: Church of England
- Churchmanship: Modern Catholic
- Website: www.chelseaparish.org

History
- Status: Active

Architecture
- Functional status: Parish church
- Heritage designation: Grade I listed
- Architect: James Savage
- Completed: 1824

Administration
- Diocese: Diocese of London
- Archdeaconry: Archdeaconry of Middlesex
- Deanery: Chelsea
- Parish: Chelsea St Luke and Christ Church

Clergy
- Rector: The Revd Preb Brian Leathard

The Parish Church of St Luke, Chelsea, is an Anglican church, on Sydney Street, Chelsea, London SW3, just off the King's Road. Ecclesiastically it is in the Deanery of Chelsea, part of the Diocese of London. It was designed by James Savage in 1819 and is of architectural significance as one of the earliest Gothic Revival churches in London, perhaps the earliest to be a complete new construction. St Luke's is one of the first group of Commissioners' churches, having received a grant of £8,333 towards its construction with money voted by Parliament as a result of the Church Building Act 1818. The church is recorded in the National Heritage List for England as a designated Grade I listed building. The gardens of St Luke's are Grade II listed on the Register of Historic Parks and Gardens.

== History ==
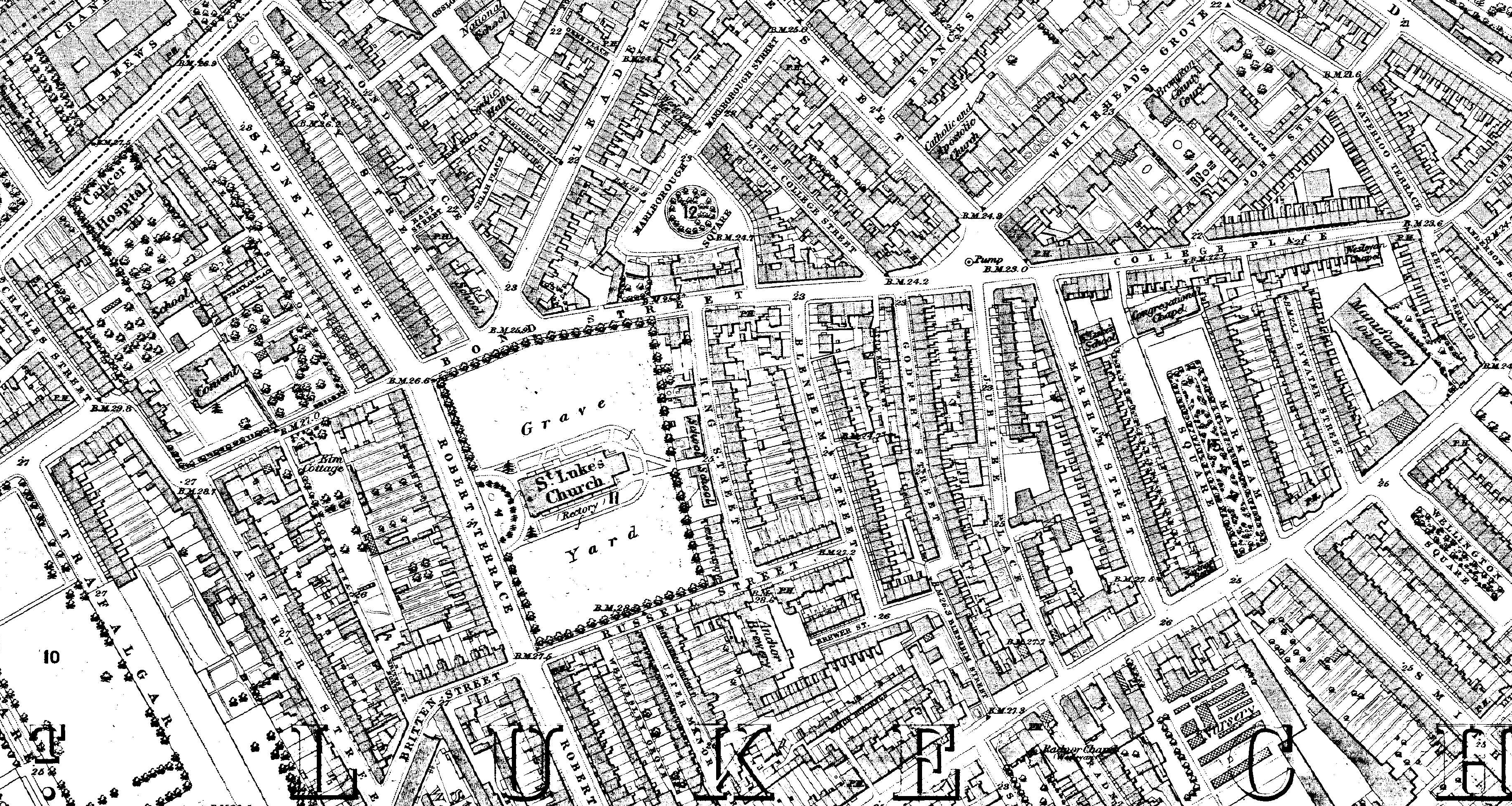
Cale Street on an 1869-80 Ordnance Survey map

In the early 19th century Chelsea was in the process of expanding from a village to an area of London. St Luke's was built as a new, more centrally located replacement for the existing parish church, now known as Chelsea Old Church, which until then was also known, though unofficially, as St Luke's. This was initially a chapel of ease to the new building following its opening. The new church was the idea of the rector of Chelsea, the Hon. and Revd Gerald Wellesley, brother of the 1st Duke of Wellington, who held his office from 1805 to 1832, seeing the consecration of the church in 1824.

In 1819 Savage's plans for the church were chosen from among more than forty submissions. Designed in imitation of the Gothic churches of the fourteenth and fifteenth centuries, the church is built of Bath stone and has a stone vault supported externally by flying buttresses. It was, according to Charles Locke Eastlake "probably the only church of its time in which the main roof was groined throughout in stone". Sir John Summerson notes similarities to Bath Abbey, King's College Chapel, Cambridge, and the tower at Magdalen College, Oxford. All are masterpieces of the Perpendicular style, although some of the detailing refers to earlier Gothic styles. Savage originally intended the tower to have an open spire, like that of Wren's St Dunstan-in-the-East, but this was forbidden by the Board of Works. Summerson praises "an air of competence and consequence about the design which makes one respect its architect very much. The interior has real dignity and the fittings are carefully detailed". Eastlake, writing in the 1870s, by which time Gothic Revival architects had developed a far better grasp of the historical styles, criticised the building for its "machine made look" and "the cold formality of its arrangement".

St Lukes's was an ambitious building, costing £40,000 and designed to accommodate 2,500 people. With Sir John Soane's Holy Trinity Church, Marylebone, it was the most expensive Commissioner's church in terms of its total cost.

The organ installed in the new church, with thirty-three sounding stops, was built by W. A. A. Nicholls but completed by Gray. It was rebuilt, using the original case and many of the pipes, by John Compton in 1932.

The interior of the church was originally arranged as a "preaching house" with a large pulpit, a small altar, and galleries over the aisles. The arrangement was altered in the 1860s, but the galleries over the nave aisles were retained. Unusually for an Anglican church of the period, the St Luke's soon acquired a large altarpiece of the Deposition of Christ by James Northcote.

Originally sharing its parish with Chelsea Old Church, in 1839 a further church, Christ Church, just off Flood St nearby, was added as a chapel of ease. Between 1860 and 1986 Christ Church was a separate parish, but is now re-united with St Luke's as the parish of St Luke and Christ Church, Chelsea, though many aspects of parish business are done separately for the two churches.

In 1959 a new east window was dedicated, replacing the stained glass that had been lost during the Blitz. Designed by the prolific stained glass artist Hugh Easton, at the time it was said to be the largest window installed in a London church since the end of the Second World War. The heraldic design portrays no biblical or saintly figures, instead it incorporates the symbols and devices of the Evangelists, Apostles and Doctors of the Church, as well as those of 105 other saints.

In 1997 the two empty niches either side of the chancel reredos were filled with sculptures by the artist Stephen Cox, known together as Vessels: Adam and Eve. The two urn-like figures are seen bowing their heads in shame for their disobedience to God. Adam, in the south niche, is fashioned from purple Imperial Porphyry, the world's hardest stone, which was sourced by the artist in Egypt. Eve, in the north niche, is fashioned from Hammamat Breccia, a green stone taken from the oldest known stone quarry in the world, also in Egypt. According to the church's own guide, the sculptures represent both God's creation and mankind's continual striving to become holy and redeemed.

== People associated ==
Charles Dickens was married at St Luke's to Catherine Hogarth, who lived in Chelsea, on 2 April 1836, two days after the publication of the first part of the Pickwick Papers, his first great success. The architect Frederic Chancellor was baptised at St Luke's on 18 May 1825. The artist Robert Gill was married on 25 May 1825, shortly before returning to India, where he spent the rest of his life, much of it copying the paintings of the Ajanta Caves. The architect William Willmer Pocock married here in 1840. The parents of Robert Baden-Powell, the founder of the Scouting movement, were married on 10 March 1846, for the third time in the case of his father Baden Powell, a distinguished mathematician and theologian. Other marriages have included William Hewson the Victorian theological writer, in 1830, John Prideaux Lightfoot, later Vice-Chancellor of the University of Oxford, in 1835, and the parents of Harry Arthur Saintsbury in 1854. The father of the authors Charles Kingsley and Henry Kingsley became the rector in 1836, when his sons were 18 and 6 respectively. Other clergy serving the parish have included Derek Watson and Ross Hook as Rector and Hugh Otter-Barry as curate.

The position of organist and choirmaster has been held by several notable musicians, often as a stepping-stone to cathedral positions. They include Henry Forbes, Sir John Goss (who wrote the hymns Praise, My Soul, the King of Heaven and the carol See, Amid the Winter Snow) and John Ireland. Ireland, who lived close by, first took up the post in July 1904 and stayed until 1926. More recently Denis Vaughan and Jeremy Filsell have been Directors of Music.

The Earls Cadogan, who owned the land around the church, have always been the patrons of the church, and there is a wall monument to Lt Colonel Henry Cadogan, who died in 1813 at the Battle of Vittoria, by Sir Francis Chantrey. Two actors and actor-managers who were famous in their day are buried in the churchyard: William Blanchard, known for comic roles, and Daniel Egerton. Both died in 1835. The educator, author and natural philosopher Margaret Bryan who died in 1836 is buried here alongside her eldest daughter, Anne. James Savage, the architect of the church, is also buried there.

St Luke's also houses the memorial chapels of the Punjab Frontier Force and 3rd Gurkha Rifles of the British Indian Army. The screen panels decorated with regimental badges are in engraved glass by Josephine Harris.

== Gallery ==
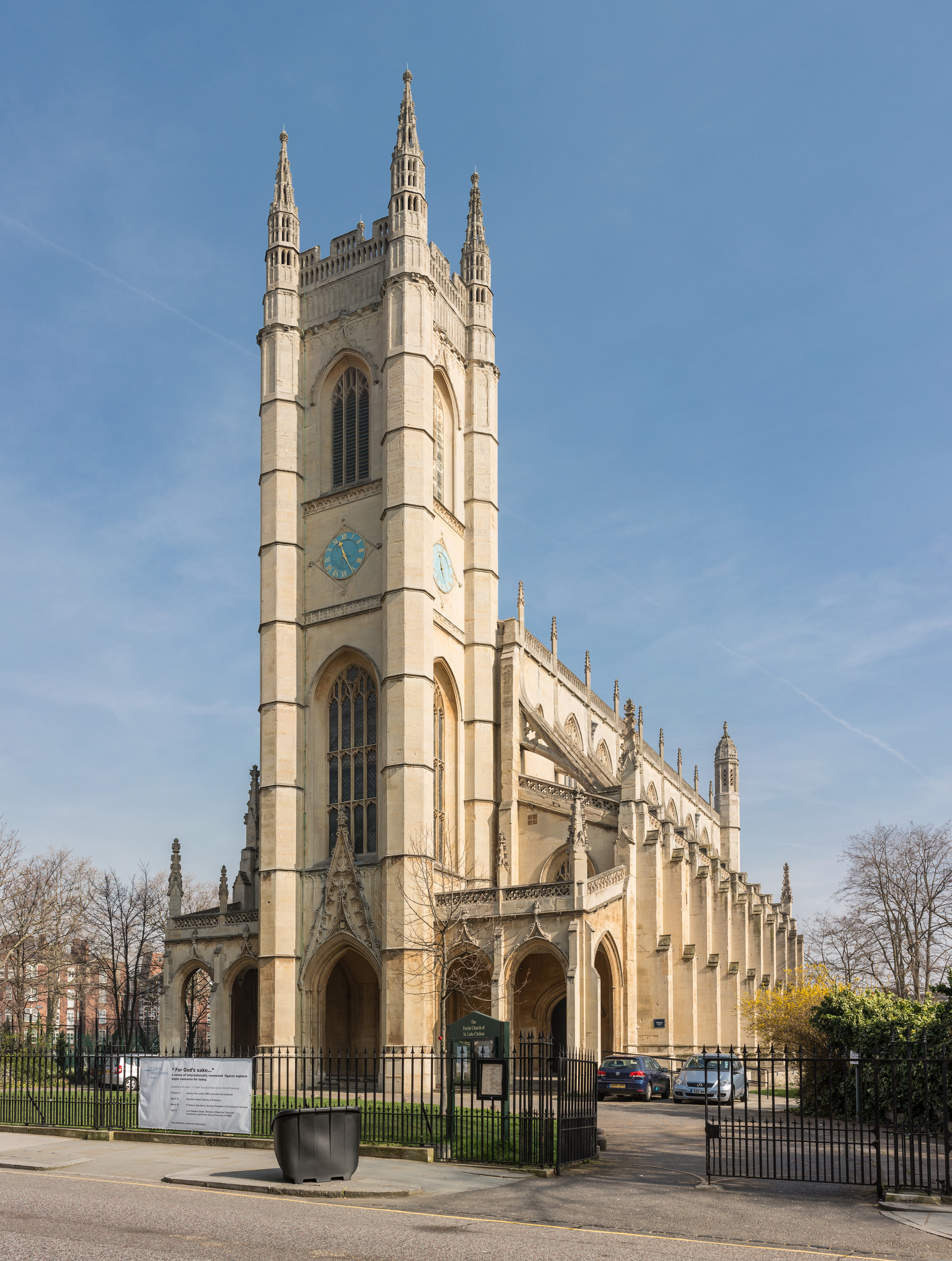
The west front, facing Sydney St

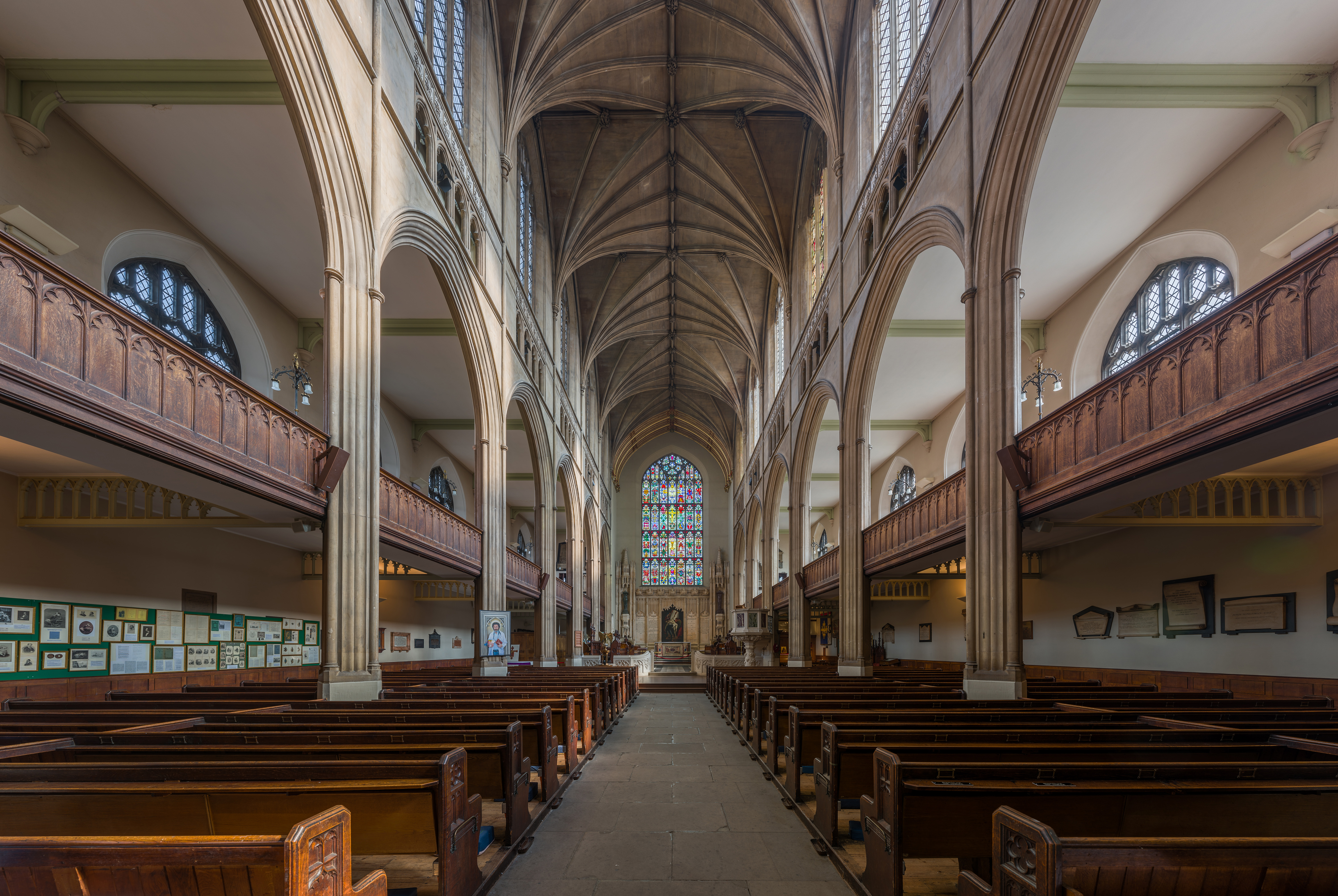
The nave, looking east towards the altar

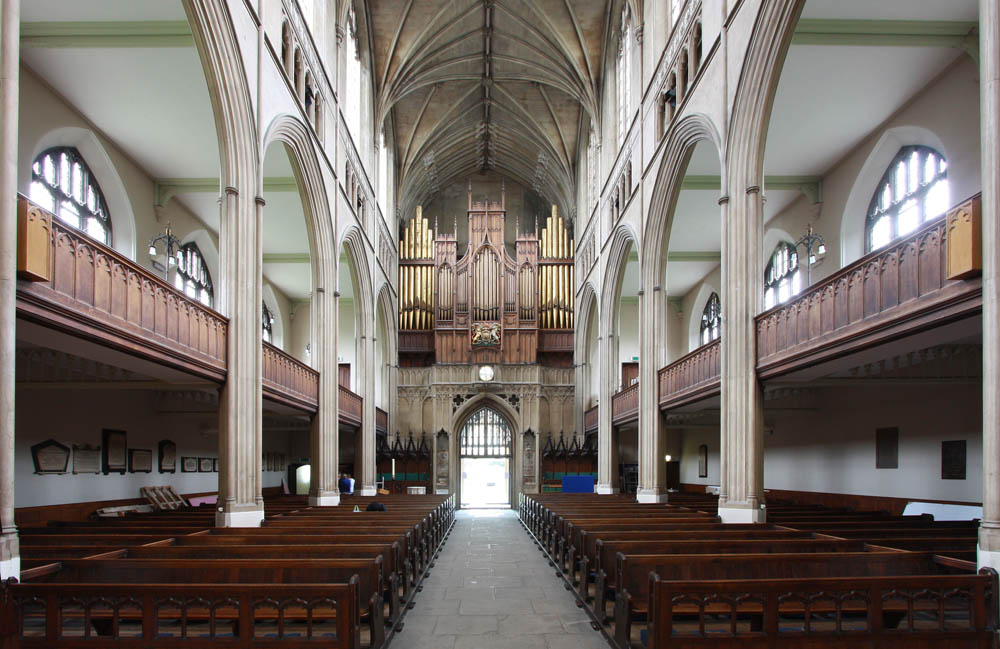
Looking west down the nave

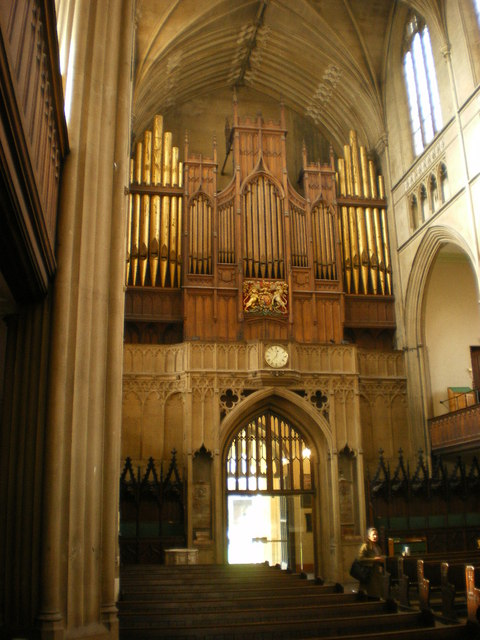
The west end and organ

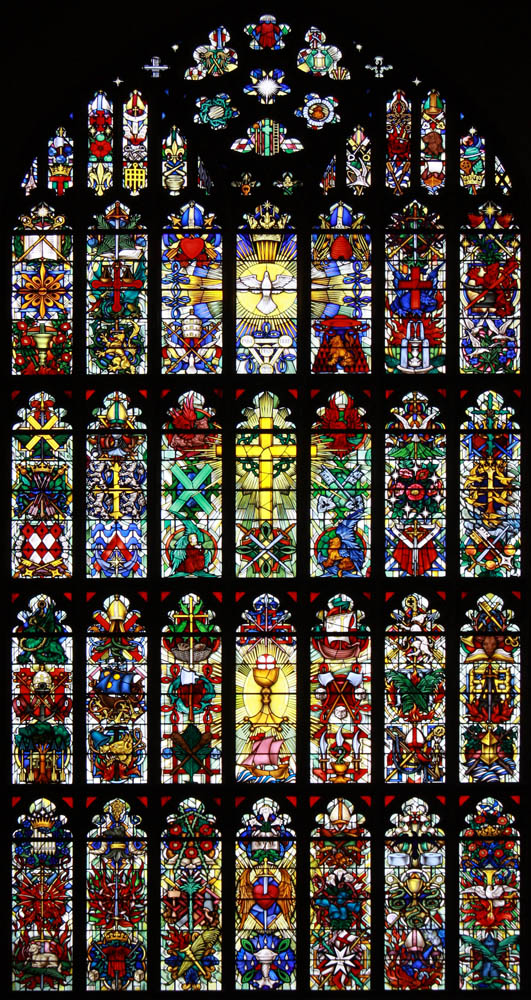
East window designed by Hugh Easton, 1959

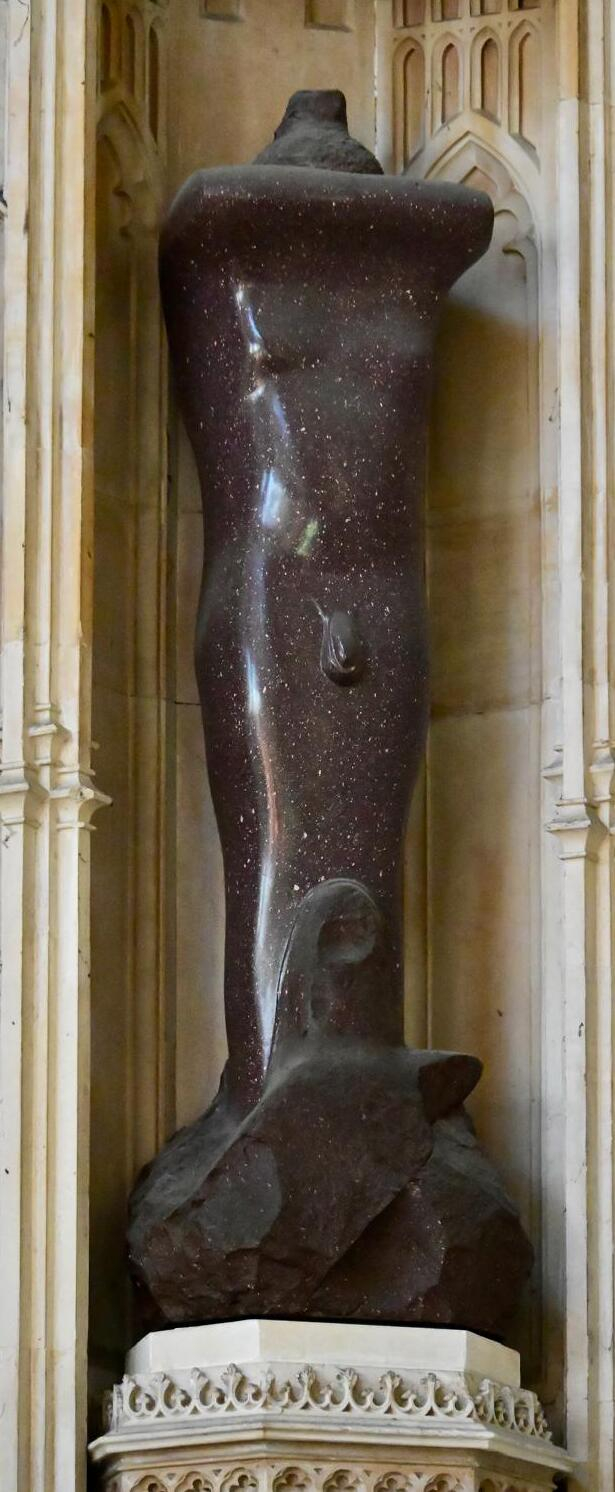
Imperial Porphyry sculpture of Adam by Stephen Cox, 1997

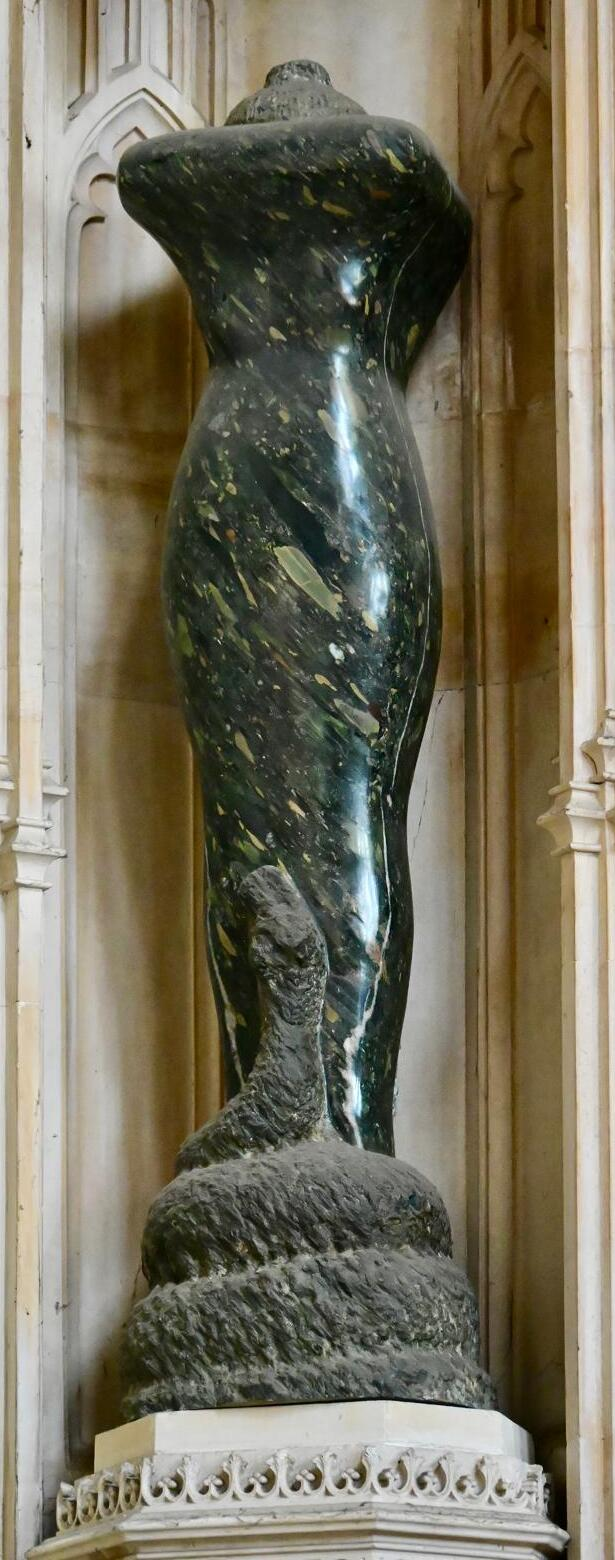
Hammamat Breccia sculpture of Eve by Stephen Cox, 1997

== Film and television ==
- St Luke's featured in a scene of the 1996 film 101 Dalmatians.
- St Luke's also featured in the fourth series of Made in Chelsea.
- In Captain America: Civil War, the funeral of Peggy Carter takes place at St Luke's.

== See also ==
- List of Commissioners' churches in London
