= A Christmas Cornucopia =

Studio album by Annie Lennox
- Released: 12 November 2010
- Recorded: October 2009 – Summer 2010 in London, England
- Studios: Sheen Lane, London; Milestone Studio, Cape Town
- Genres: Christmas; world
- Length: 45:16
- Labels: Island; Decca
- Producers: Annie Lennox; Mike Stevens

Annie Lennox chronology
The Annie Lennox Collection (2009)	A Christmas Cornucopia (2010)	Nostalgia (2014)

Singles from A Christmas Cornucopia
- 1. "Universal Child" Released: 12 October 2010; 2. "God Rest Ye Merry Gentlemen" Released: 4 November 2010; 3. "The Holly and the Ivy" Released: 12 December 2011

A Christmas Cornucopia is the fifth solo studio album, and the first Christmas album, by Scottish singer-songwriter Annie Lennox, released in November 2010. It was Lennox's first album after signing to the Universal Music Group (Island Records in the UK, Decca in the US and Canada) following her departure from Sony BMG, which had been her label for almost 30 years.

== Background and release ==
The album is a collection of Lennox's favourite Christmas songs, though includes one original track written by Lennox, "Universal Child", which was released digitally as a single on 12 October 2010. A music video for Lennox's version of the classic Christmas carol "God Rest Ye Merry Gentlemen" premiered on 4 November 2010, which was released as the second digital single from the album. A tenth anniversary special edition of the album was released on 20 November 2020 including a new recording, "Dido's Lament". A choral version of "Dido’s Lament" performed together with London City Voices (a non-audition community choir based in London) was donated to Greenpeace. The official video begins with the following quote by Annie Lennox:

"When it comes to climate catastrophe, we are on the edge of abyss. I really believe we don't have much time left to make an effective change. We are looking at a civilization on the downwards side. This is the truth of this matter. It's staring us in the face, and we are not paying any significant attention—continuing on as if it doesn't exist. I see Dido's Lament as a lament for our dying planet."

== Reception ==
Professional ratings
Aggregate scores
Source	Rating
Metacritic	73/100
Review scores
Source	Rating
AllMusic	4/5 stars
The Austin Chronicle	2.5/5 stars
BBC Music	very positive
The Guardian	4/5 stars
Los Angeles Times	4/4 stars
The New York Times	positive
Slant Magazine	3.5/5 stars

Metacritic assessed A Christmas Cornucopia to have a weighted average score of 73 based on 9 reviews, meaning "generally favorable reviews". Ian Wade of BBC Music gave the album a very positive review, saying "this collection could find itself becoming as much a part of the holiday season as arguments with loved ones." Sal Cinquemani of Slant Magazine awarded the album 3.5/5 and said "Lennox seems more inspired on A Christmas Cornucopia than she has in years." John Hunt of Qatar Today magazine gave the album 9/10 and said "in particular, the vocal work and musical arrangement of 'God Rest Ye Merry Gentlemen' are impactful to the point of being intimidating."

== Track listing ==
No.	Title	Writer(s)	Length
1.	"Angels from the Realms of Glory"	James Montgomery	4:00
2.	"God Rest Ye Merry Gentlemen"	Traditional	3:32
3.	"See Amid the Winter's Snow"	Edward Caswall, John Goss	3:31
4.	"Il est né le divin Enfant"	Traditional	3:37
5.	"The First Noel"	Traditional	4:40
6.	"Lullay Lullay (The Coventry Carol)"	Traditional	3:13
7.	"The Holly and the Ivy"	Traditional	3:37
8.	"In the Bleak Midwinter"	Christina Rossetti	3:31
9.	"As Joseph was a Walking (The Cherry Tree Carol)"	Geoffrey Shaw	3:59
10.	"O Little Town of Bethlehem"	Phillips Brooks	3:33
11.	"Silent Night"	Joseph Mohr, Franz Gruber, John Freeman Young	3:49
12.	"Universal Child"	Annie Lennox	4:14
Total length:			45:16

== Commercial performance ==
As of January 2011, Christmas Cornucopia has sold 179,000 copies in the United States.

== Personnel ==
- Annie Lennox – accordion, African drums, African percussion, arranger, dulcimer, Fender Rhodes, flute, harmonium, keyboards, marimba, orchestral arrangements, pan pipes, percussion, piano, pipe organ, producer, reed organ, santur, string arrangements, triangle, vibraphone, vocal percussion, vocals, whisper, whistle, Wurlitzer
- Dave Robbins – conductor
- Mike Stevens – arranger, bass, drones, engineer, glockenspiel, acoustic guitar, nylon string guitar, keyboards, mixing, music box, orchestral arrangements, organ, Hammond organ, oud, African drums, producer, programming, string arrangements, strings
- Barry Van Zyl – African drums, percussion
- The African Children's Choir – vocals

Technical

- Matt Allison, Marcus Byrne – engineer
- Heff Moraes – mixing, mixing consultant
- Mike Owen – photography

== Charts ==
=== Weekly charts ===
Weekly chart performance for A Christmas Cornucopia
Chart (2010–2011)	Peak position
Australian Albums (ARIA)	76
Austrian Albums (Ö3 Austria)	35
Belgian Albums (Ultratop Flanders)	74
Belgian Albums (Ultratop Wallonia)	64
Canadian Albums (Billboard)	19
Dutch Albums (Album Top 100)	60
French Albums (SNEP)	115
German Albums (Offizielle Top 100)	37
Irish Albums (IRMA)	58
Italian Albums (FIMI)	24
Norwegian Albums (VG-lista)	38
Scottish Albums (Official Charts)	22
Swedish Albums (Sverigetopplistan)	24
Swiss Albums (Schweizer Hitparade)	38
UK Albums (Official Charts)	16
US Billboard 200	35
US Top Holiday Albums (Billboard)	7

=== Year-end charts ===
2010 year-end chart performance for A Christmas Cornucopia
Chart (2010)	Position
UK Albums (OCC)	69

2011 year-end chart performance for A Christmas Cornucopia
Chart (2011)	Position
US Billboard 200	185

== Certifications ==
Certifications for A Christmas Cornucopia
Region	Certification	Certified units/sales
United Kingdom (BPI)	Gold	100,000^{^}
^{^} Shipments figures based on certification alone.

== Release history ==
Region	Date	Label	Format	Catalogue
Germany	12 November 2010	Decca Records	CD, digital download	B0043A0PXU
Germany	12 November 2010	Decca Records	LP record	B0043A0PY4
United Kingdom	15 November 2010	Island Records	CD, digital download	
Ireland	15 November 2010	Island Records	CD, digital download	
United States	16 November 2010	Decca Records	CD, digital download	
United States	23 November 2010	Decca Records	LP record	
