= Collapse of the Atlantic northwest cod fishery =

Environmental disaster in Canada and New England

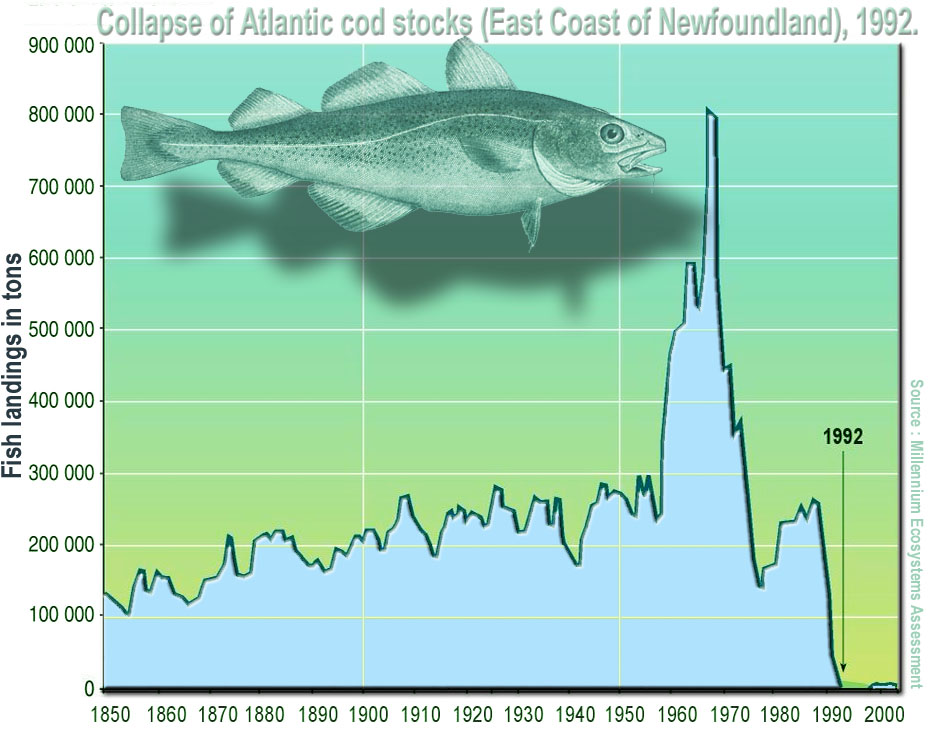
The Atlantic fishery abruptly collapsed in 1992 after overfishing from the late 1950s and an earlier partial collapse in the 1970s. It is possible to recover to historical, sustainable levels by 2030.

In 1992, Northern cod populations fell to 1% of historic levels, in large part from decades of overfishing. The Canadian federal minister of fisheries and oceans, John Crosbie, declared a moratorium on the Northern Cod fishery, which had primarily shaped the lives and communities of Canada's eastern coast for 500 years. A significant factor contributing to the depletion of the cod stocks off Newfoundland's shores was the introduction of equipment and technology that increased landed fish volume. From the 1950s onwards, new technology allowed fishers to trawl a larger area more deeply and for longer, with the catches peaking in the 1970s and 1980s. Cod stocks were depleted at a faster rate than could be replenished.

The trawlers also caught enormous amounts of non-commercial fish, which were economically unimportant but very important ecologically. The incidental catch undermined the stability of the ecosystem by depleting stocks of important predator and prey species.

== Technological factors ==
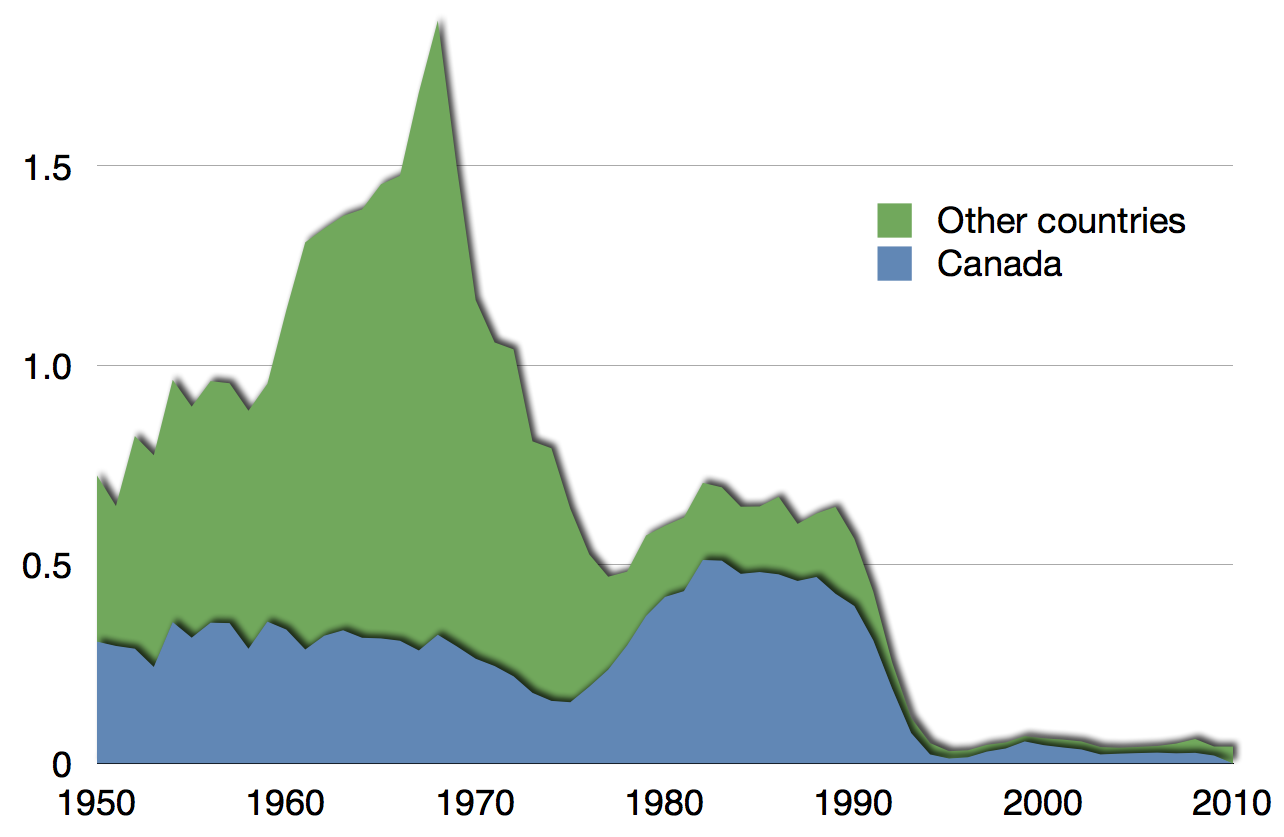
Capture of the Atlantic northwest cod stock in million tonnes, with Canadian capture in blue

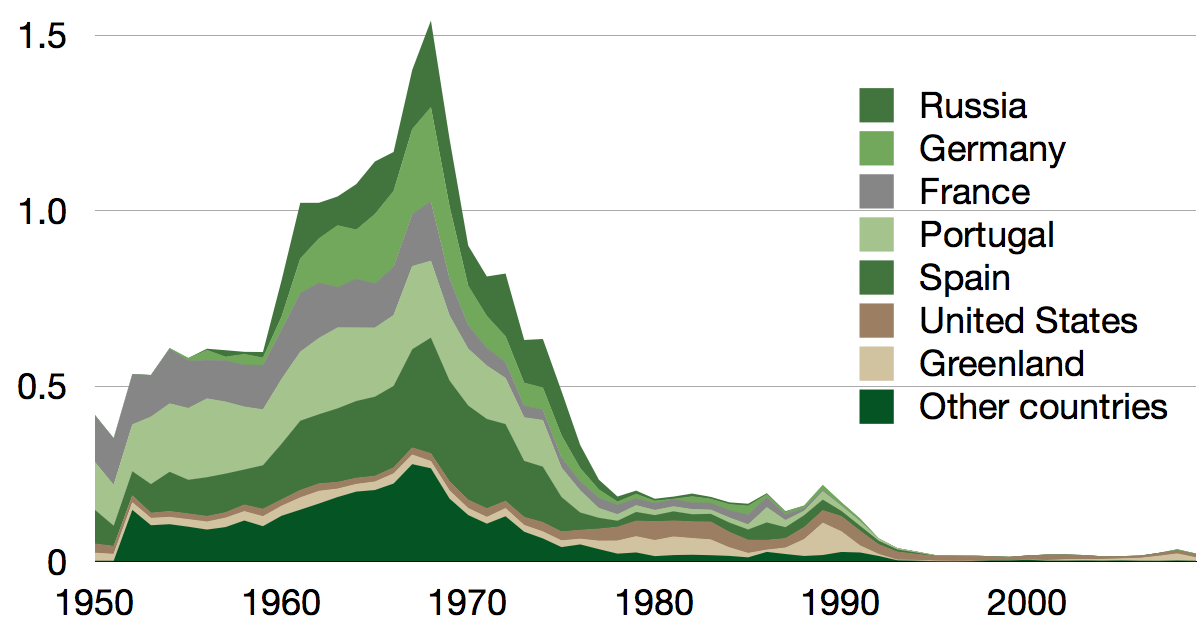
Capture of the Atlantic northwest cod stock in million tonnes, apart from Canada

A significant factor contributing to the depletion of the cod stocks off the shores of Newfoundland included the introduction and proliferation of equipment and technology that increased the volume of landed fish. For centuries, local fishers had used technology that limited the volume of their catch and the area that they fished. It also let them target specific species and ages of fish. From the 1950s onwards, as was common in all other industries, new technology was introduced that allowed fishers to trawl a larger area and to fish more deeply and for longer. By the 1960s, powerful trawlers that were equipped with radar, electronic navigation systems, and sonar allowed crews to pursue fish with unparalleled success, and Canadian catches peaked in the late 1970s and the early 1980s.

The new technologies adversely affected the northern cod population by increasing both the area and the depth that were fished. The cod were being depleted until the surviving fish could not replenish the stock that was lost each year. The trawlers caught enormous amounts of non-commercial fish, which are very important ecologically. Economically-unimportant incidental catch undermines ecosystem stability by depleting stocks of important predator and prey species. Significant amounts of capelin, an important prey species for the cod, were caught as bycatch and further undermined the survival of the remaining cod stock.

== Ecology ==
Poor knowledge and understanding of the ocean ecosystem related with Newfoundland's Grand Banks and cod fisheries, as well as technical and environmental challenges associated with observational metrics, led to a misunderstanding of data on the "cod stocks," the residual and recoverable fish. Rather than metrics of megatonnage of harvest or average size of fish, metrics of the residuum had a high variation in the countable population because sampling errors and dynamic environmental factors like the ocean temperature made it difficult to discern the effects of exploitation to an amateur regulator. That led to uncertainty of predictions about the "cod stock," which made it difficult for the Department of Fisheries and Oceans in Canada to choose the appropriate course of action when the federal government's priorities were elsewhere.

== Socioeconomic factors ==
In addition to ecological considerations, social and economic factors also influenced decisions on the future of the fisheries. Throughout Atlantic Canada but especially in Newfoundland, the cod fishery was a source of social and cultural identity. For many families, it also represented their livelihood since most families were connected directly or indirectly with the fishery as fishermen, fish plant workers, fish sellers, fish transporters, or employees in related businesses. Additionally, many companies, both foreign and domestic, and individuals had invested heavily in the fishery's boats, equipment, and infrastructure.

== Mismanagement ==
In 1949, Newfoundland joined Canada as a province and so its fishery fell under the management of the Department of Fisheries and Oceans (DFO). The department mismanaged the resource and allowed overfishing.

In 1968, the cod catch peaked at 810,000 tons, approximately three times more than the maximum yearly catch achieved before the super-trawlers. Around eight million tons of cod were caught between 1647 and 1750 (103 years), encompassing 25 to 40 cod generations. The factory trawlers took the same amount in 15 years. In 1969, the number of fishing trawlers increased, and coastal fishermen complained. That resulted in the federal government redefining the offshore fishery boundaries several times. In 1976, the Canadian government declared the right under the UNCLOS to manage the fisheries in an exclusive economic zone that extended to 200 nautical miles (370 km; 230 mi) offshore. Fish mortality decreased immediately, not because of a rise in cod stocks but because foreign trawlers could no longer fish the waters. Therefore, DFO set quotas overestimating the total supply and increased the total allowable catch. With the absence of foreign fishing, many Canadian and American fishing trawlers took their place, and the number of cod kept diminishing past the point of recovery.

Many local fishers noticed the drastic decrease of cod and tried to inform local government officials. In a 1978 white paper, the Newfoundland government stated:

It must be recognised that both the Federal and Provincial Governments, plant workers, and the private sector, which includes fishermen, all have a role to play at influencing and directing the course of development within the fisheries sector. It is essential, therefore, that various interest group conflicts be minimized and that the appropriate measures be taken to ensure that benefits accruing from the exploitation of fish stocks are consistent with rational resource management objectives and desirable socio-economic considerations.

In 1986, scientists reviewed calculations and data and determined that the total allowable catch rate had to be cut in half to conserve cod stocks. However, even with the new statistics brought to light, no changes were made in the allotted yearly catch of cod. With only a limited knowledge of cod biology, scientists predicted that the population of the species would rebound from its low point in 1975.

In the early-1990s, however, the industry collapsed entirely. In 1992, Minister of Fisheries and Oceans John Crosbie set the quota for cod at 187,969 tonnes, even though only 129,033 tonnes had been caught the previous year. Months later, the government announced a two-year moratorium on cod fishing. The moratorium was limited in the hope that the northern cod population and thus the fishery would recover. By 1993, facing the collapse of six cod populations, the government removed the limit and extended the moratorium indefinitely. Spawning biomass had decreased by at least 75% in all stocks, by 90% in three of the six stocks, and by 99% in the case of "northern" cod, which was once the largest cod fishery in the world. The previous increases in catches had been wrongly thought to be caused by "the stock growing" but were really caused by new technology such as trawlers.

Intense fishing pressure also contributed to fisheries-induced evolution in northern cod. Maturation reaction norms of northern cod had shifted towards younger ages and smaller sizes in the decade that led up to the collapse. The small size at maturity has continued into the mid 2000s, despite stricter fishing regulations, which supports the theory that there have been genetic changes in growth in Northern cod populations in response to size-selective fishing. In addition, the trend has been attributed to a hypothesis suggesting that selection differentials that are caused by the environment are not as strong as the artificial selection differentials that have been imposed by heavy fishing. Other factors for the slow recovery of the original life-history characteristics of cod include lower genetic heritable variation from overexploitation. It has been estimated that such a full recovery of life-history characteristics in a population of cod may take up to 84 years.

== Impact on Newfoundland ==
Approximately 37,000 fishermen and fish plant workers lost their jobs by the collapse of the cod fisheries; many people had to find new jobs or further their education to find employment. The effects are reflected in the Canadian folklorist and songwriter Shelley Posen's song "No More Fish, No Fishermen," and heavily covered in contemporary media.

The collapse of the northern cod fishery marked a profound change in the ecological, economic, and sociocultural structure of Atlantic Canada. The 1992 moratorium was the largest industrial closure in Canadian history and was expressed most acutely in Newfoundland, whose continental shelf lay under the region that was the most heavily fished. Over 35,000 fishermen and plant workers from over 400 coastal communities became unemployed. In response to dire warnings of social and economic consequences, the federal government initially provided income assistance through the Northern Cod Adjustment and Recovery Program and later through the Atlantic Groundfish Strategy, which included money specifically for the retraining of those workers displaced by the closing of the fishery. Newfoundland has since experienced a dramatic environmental, industrial, economic, and social restructuring, including considerable outward migration, increased economic diversification, and increased emphasis on education. As the predatory groundfish population declined, a thriving invertebrates fishing industry emerged, snow crab and northern shrimp proliferated, which provides the basis for a new initiative roughly equivalent in economic value to the cod fishery that it replaced.

== Post-collapse management ==
In 1997, the Minister for DFO partly lifted the ban on Canadian cod fishing ten days before a federal election. However, independent Canadian scientists and the International Council for the Exploration of the Sea doubted there had been sufficient recovery. In general, depleted populations of cod and other gadids do not appear to recover easily when pressure from fishing is reduced or stopped.

In 1998, the Committee on the Status of Endangered Wildlife in Canada (COSEWIC) assessed Atlantic cod. COSEWIC's designations, in theory, are informed by reports that it commissions and by expert discussion in the panel, and it claims to be scientific and apolitical. Recognizing faults in processes is not recreational but is an essential step in their improvement. In this case, much was mishandled. One observer, who opined that the "this process stinks," later joined and then became Chair of COSEWIC, which listed Atlantic cod as "vulnerable" (this category later renamed "special concern") on a single-unit basis: assuming a single homogeneous population. The assigned basis (single-unit) of designation and the level (vulnerable) contrasted to the range of designations, including "endangered" for some of the ten management (sub) units addressed in the report that COSEWIC had commissioned from Dr. K.N.I. Bell. The contradiction between the report and the listing reflected political pressure from the DFO; such bureaucratic pressure had been evident through three years of drafts.

The 1998 designation followed on from a deferral in 1997 and bureaucratic tactics that included what one COSEWIC insider characterized as "a plan to make it late." Press interest before the 1998 meeting had, however, likely deterred a further deferral. COSEWIC's "single-unit" basis of listing was at the behest of DFO, which had demanded in criticism (properly given the new evidence) that the report address multiple stocks. Bell had agreed with that criticism and revised accordingly, but DFO then changed its mind without explanation.

By the time of COSEWIC's 1998 cod discussion, the Chair had been ousted for having said, "I have seen a lot of status reports... it is as good as I have ever seen in regards to content." COSEWIC had already attempted to alter the 1998 report unilaterally. The report remains one of an undeclared number that have been illegally suppressed (COSEWIC refuses to officially release it unless it can change it "so that it... reflects COSEWIC's designation"), in this case despite kudos from eminent reviewers of COSEWIC's own choice. COSEWIC defended itself by asserting a right to alter the report or that Bell had been asked to provide a report that supported COSEWIC's designation. Either defence would involve explicit violations of ethics, COSEWIC's procedures at the time, and scientific norms. The key tactics used to avert any at-risk listing centred on the issue of stock discreteness, and DFO's single-stock stance within COSEWIC contradicted the multiple-stock hypothesis supported by the most recent science, including DFO's, hence DFO's earlier and proper demand for the issues to be addressed by the report address. Bell has argued that the contradiction between fact and tactic effectively painted management into a corner. It could not acknowledge or explain the contrast between areas in which conservation measures were needed and those in which opposite observations were gaining press attention.

In 1998, the Committee on the Status of Endangered Wildlife in Canada (COSEWIC) listed the Atlantic cod as "vulnerable," a category that was subsequently rebranded as "special concern" though not as an endangered species. The decision process is formally supposed to be informed by Reports that are commissioned from authors. Dr. Kim N.I. Bell authored the 1998 Status Report for COSEWIC. It was the first such report on a commercial fish species in Canada. The potential designation change (from "not at risk" to "endangered") was highly contentious because many considered that the collapse of Atlantic cod had ultimately resulted from mismanagement by DFO. The report (in the section Author's Recommendation of Status), therefore, discussed at great length the process of developing a recommendation for the designation.

The report contained discussion that addressed points that DFO had offered because although COSEWIC had a mechanism for the "jurisdiction" (the department responsible for the 2species" (here, for the population) to provide objections to an author), it had no mechanism for those objections to be objectively arbitrated as a matter of science. Rebuttal by authors was untraditional and unexpected. That is undoubtedly why before the meeting that was to decide the designation, COSEWIC had massively unannouncedly edited the report, thereby introducing many errors and changing meanings, including by removing the word "few" from "there are few indications of improvement" and expunging a substantial section that engaged various objections raised by DFO. When the author discovered the unauthorized "edits," COSEWIC was obliged to circulate a letter explaining that it had sent out a version that lacked the author's approval and had to provide the author's version to members.

The report contained, under the subsection "Designation by geographic management units (as preferred by DFO in 1996)," recommendations (or options) for 10 geographic management unitsL not at risk or vulnerable (for 1 management area), threatened, or endangered (for 5 management areas), and to endangered (for 4 management areas). In its designation, COSEWIC

1. Disregarded population structure and provided a recommendation based on the presumption of a single homogeneous population, which even DFO's own internal documents concluded was unlikely, compared to heterogeneity.
2. Disregarded the arithmetic that clearly put declines in high "at risk" categories and applied a decision of vulnerable, a lower-risk category, to the entire species within Canadian waters.
3. Did not account for its designation variation from the report's recommendation or admit that variation.

COSEWIC also refused to release the report in violation to its rules. Bell, the report's author, subsequently stated that political pressure by the DFO within COSEWIC had accounted for the difference.

In 1998 in a book, Bell argued that the collapse of the fishery and the failure of the listing process had ultimately been facilitated by secrecy (as long ago in the defence science context observed by the venerable C. P. Snow and recently cast as "government information control" in the fishery context) and the lack of a code of ethics appropriate to (at least) scientists, whose findings are relevant to conservation and public resource management. He wrote that a proper code of ethics would acknowledge the obligations of all to conservation, the right of the public to know and to understand scientific findings, the obligation of scientists to communicate vital issues with the public, acknowledge no right of bureaucrats to impede that dialogue; to be effective, such ethical issues would have to be included in science curricula.

Mark Kurlansky, in his 1999 book about cod, wrote that the collapse of the cod fishery off Newfoundland and the 1992 decision by Canada to impose an indefinite moratorium on the Grand Banks were dramatic examples of the consequences of overfishing.

== Later developments (2000–2024) ==
In 2000, the World Wide Fund for Nature placed cod on the endangered species list. The WWF issued a report stating that the global cod catch had dropped by 70% over the last 30 years and that if the trend continued, the world's cod stocks would disappear in 15 years. Åsmund Bjordal, the director of the Norwegian Institute of Marine Research, disputed the WWF's claim and noted the healthy Barents Sea cod population.

By 2002, after a ten-year moratorium on fishing, the cod had still not returned. The local ecosystem seemed to have changed, with forage fish, such as capelin, which used to provide food for the cod, increase in numbers, and eat the juvenile cod. The waters appeared to be dominated by crab and shrimp, rather than fish. Local inshore fishermen blamed hundreds of factory trawlers, mainly from Eastern Europe, which started arriving soon after World War II and caught all of the breeding cod.

In 2003, COSEWIC designated the Newfoundland and Labrador population of Atlantic cod as endangered in an update, and Fisheries Minister Robert Thibault announced an indefinite closure of the cod fishery in the Gulf of St. Lawrence and off the northeast coast of Newfoundland, thus closing the last remaining cod fishery in Atlantic Canada. In the Canadian system, however, under the 2002 Species at Risk Act (SARA) the ultimate determination of conservation status (e.g., endangered) is a political decision. The Canadian Cabinet decided not to accept COSEWIC's 2003 recommendations. Bell explained how both COSEWIC and public perceptions were manipulated and the governing law was broken to favour that decision.

In 2004, the WWF in a report agreed that the Barents Sea cod fishery appeared to be healthy but that the situation might not last because of illegal fishing, industrial development, and high quotas.

In The End of the Line: How Overfishing Is Changing the World and What We Eat, the author Charles Clover claimed that cod is only one example of how the modern unsustainable fishing industry is destroying ocean ecosystems.

In 2005, WWF—Canada accused foreign and Canadian fishing vessels of deliberate large-scale violations of the restrictions on the Grand Banks in the form of bycatch. It also claimed poor enforcement by the Northwest Atlantic Fisheries Organization, an intergovernmental organization with a mandate to provide scientific fishery advice and management in the northwestern Atlantic.

In 2006, the Norwegian Institute of Marine Research considered coastal cod but not the North East Arctic cod to be endangered, but it has since reversed that assessment.

In November 2006, Fisheries and Oceans Canada released an article suggesting that the unexpectedly slow recovery of the cod stock has been caused by inadequate food supplies, the cooling of the North Atlantic, and a poor genetic stock from the overfishing of larger cod (fisheries-induced evolution).

A 2010 study by the Northwest Atlantic Fisheries Organization found that stocks in the Grand Banks near Newfoundland and Labrador had recovered by 69% since 2007, which, however, was only 10% of the original stock.

In 2010, Greenpeace International added the Atlantic cod to its seafood red list, which is "a list of fish that are commonly sold in supermarkets worldwide, and which have a very high risk of being sourced from unsustainable fisheries." According to Seafood Watch, cod is currently on the list of fish that consumers should avoid.

In summer 2011, a study announced that East Coast cod stocks around Nova Scotia showed promise of recovery from 2005, despite earlier fears of a complete collapse. It said that on the Scotian Shelf after the cod were gone, the small plankton-eating fish (capelin, etc.) that the cod had eaten multiplied to many times their old numbers and ate cod eggs and cod hatchlings. However, the small fish collapsed in the early 2000s, which gave a window of opportunity in 2005 for the cod to start to recover. However, more time and studies were needed to study the long-term stability of the stock increase.

In 2011 in a letter to Nature, a team of Canadian scientists reported that cod in the Scotian Shelf ecosystem, off Canada, showed signs of recovery. Brian Petrie, a team member said, "Cod is about a third of the way to full recovery, and haddock is already back to historical biomass levels." Despite such positive reports, cod landings continued to decline since 2009, according to Fisheries and Oceans Canada statistics through 2012.

In 2015, two reports on cod fishery recovery suggested stocks had somewhat recovered.

- A Canadian scientist reported that cod were increasing in numbers and health and normalizing in maturity and behaviour and offered a promising estimate of increased biomass in particular areas.
- A US report suggested that a failure to consider reduced resilience of cod populations from increased mortality in warming surface water of the Gulf of Maine had led to overfishing despite regulation. Thus, overestimates of stock biomass by generalizing local estimates and ignoring environmental factors in the growth or recovery potential of a cod fishery would again lead to mismanagement and further collapse of stocks by further unsustainable quotas, as in the past.

In June 2018, the Department of Fisheries and Oceans reduced the cod quota to 9500 tons since it found that the cod stocks had fallen again after just two years of fair catches.

In 2024, the Canadian government lifted the fishing ban for cod off the north and east coasts of Newfoundland and Labrador. It allowed commercial fishing for the first time since 1992 and set the total allowable catch at 18,000 tons.

== See also ==
- Cod fisheries
- Newfoundland outport
- Sustainable fishery
