= Universal Child =

Single by Annie Lennox

from the album A Christmas Cornucopia
- Released: 12 October 2010
- Recorded: 2009
- Studio: Sheen Lane (London); Milestone Studio (Cape Town)
- Genre: Christmas, pop, soul
- Length: 4:14
- Label: Island
- Songwriter: Annie Lennox
- Producer: Mike Stevens

Annie Lennox singles chronology
"Full Steam" (2009)	"Universal Child" (2010)	"God Rest Ye Merry Gentlemen" (2010)

Audio video
- "Universal Child" on YouTube

"Universal Child" is a single by Scottish recording artist Annie Lennox, released worldwide on 12 October 2010 on Island Records. It is the lead single from her fifth studio album, A Christmas Cornucopia.

== Background ==
"Universal Child" was the one original composition from A Christmas Cornucopia, her first Christmas album. Lennox was planning on recording some carols, and hadn't written new material since 2007's Songs of Mass Destruction. During recording the words "Universal Child" came into her mind and during a break, chords and a melody presented themselves. Lennox donated all royalties from the song to The Annie Lennox Foundation. Lennox is herself a Christmas child.

== Release ==
"Universal Child" was released digitally on 12 October 2010.

== Live performances ==
In August 2010, Lennox signed a new contract with Island Records in the UK and Decca Records in the US (both part of the Universal Music Group). Her first release was a Christmas album entitled A Christmas Cornucopia, issued 15 November 2010. The album is a collection of Lennox's interpretations of traditional festive songs such as "Silent Night" and "The First Noel", along with one new composition, "Universal Child", which was released as a download-only single on 13 October 2010. Lennox had previously showcased the song on the American Idol Gives Back TV show in April 2010. She also performed the song live for several TV audiences during the week of the album's release in November. These included The Tonight Show with Jay Leno and Dancing with the Stars. She sang "Universal Child" and "Gloria in Excelsis Deo" from the album for the TNT special Christmas in Washington.

== Track listings ==
CD single

1. "Universal Child" (Radio edit)

Digital single

1. "Universal Child" – 4:14

== Chart performance ==
Chart (2010)	Peak position
Scotland (OCC)	75
United Kingdom (OCC)	88
US Adult Contemporary (Billboard)	26
