= I Cover the Waterfront (song) =

1933 popular song and jazz standard

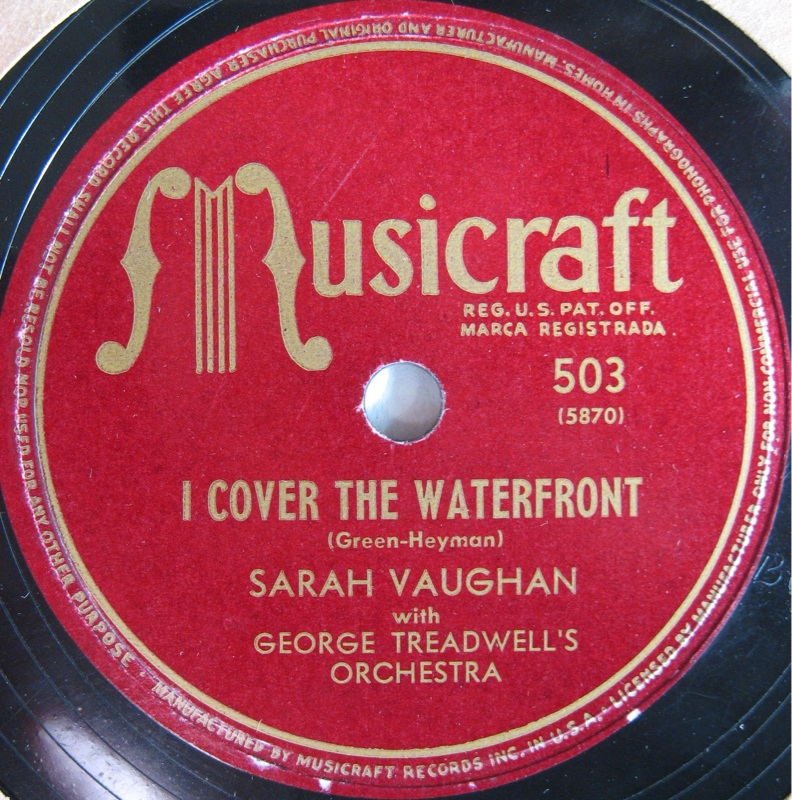

Single by Sarah Vaughan
- Genre: Jazz blues
- Songwriter(s): Edward Heyman
- Producer(s): Johnny Green

Sarah Vaughan singles chronology
"If You Could See Me Now" (1946)	"I Cover the Waterfront" (1947)	"Tenderly" (1947)

Billie Holiday singles chronology
"God Bless the Child" (1942)	"I Cover the Waterfront" (1946)	"Lady Sings the Blues" (1956)

"I Cover the Waterfront" is a 1933 popular song and jazz standard composed by Johnny Green with lyrics by Edward Heyman. The song was inspired by Max Miller's 1932 best-selling novel, I Cover the Waterfront.

== Recordings and interpretations ==
- Lucky Thompson - The Complete Vogue Recordings Vol. 1 (1956)

The song became popular, and many artists have recorded it since 1933. Notable artists include:

- Billie Holiday
- Frank Sinatra
- Sarah Vaughan
- Annette Hanshaw
- Abe Lyman's California Ambassador Hotel Orchestra
- Connee Boswell
- Harry James
- Louis Armstrong
- Years later, Ella Fitzgerald recorded this song in her 1979 live album Digital III at Montreux on Pablo Records.
- Annie Lennox gave her interpretation of the song on her 2014 studio album Nostalgia.
- John Lee Hooker recorded several versions of the song. One appears on the 1991 compilation The Ultimate Collection and another with Van Morrison on Hooker's 1991 album Mr. Lucky. Hooker's versions make such changes from the original melody and lyrics that his label credits him as the songwriter.
- In 2017, the musicians Chris Thile and Brad Mehldau collaborated on an album recording of the track.

== Film role ==
A 1933 motion picture, also inspired by Miller's book and also titled I Cover the Waterfront, was re-scored at the last minute to include the tune. Sheet music publishers later used the film's success by claiming that the song was "[i]nspired by the United Artist Picture of the same name".

== Radio program theme ==
- I Cover the Waterfront was the theme for the Johnny Modero, Pier 23 radio program, which starred Jack Webb and was broadcast on the Mutual Broadcasting System in 1947.

== Popular culture ==
- R&B/soul singer/actress Miki Howard, portraying Billie Holiday, performed the song in the 1992 bio film Malcolm X.

== See also ==
- List of 1930s jazz standards
