= Chelsea College of Aeronautical and Automobile Engineering =

Coordinates: 51.4880°N 0.1689°W

The Chelsea College of Aeronautical and Automobile Engineering was an independent and private educational organisation established in 1924 by its principal, S C H Roberts as the Automobile Engineering College. It was formally expanded to include aeronautical engineering in 1931 in association with Brooklands School of Flying.

A separate institution named The College of Aeronautical Engineering was established while the Automobile Engineering College was evacuated to Wimbledon Park after the destruction of the Chelsea premises by enemy action. In 1946 the institutions were united as The College of Aeronautical and Automobile Engineering. They returned to new premises at 102 Sydney Street SW3 in 1952.

When Stanley Coryton Hugh Roberts (known as "C H") died in September 1957 there were more than 400 students training at his institution in Chelsea. C H also founded the British School of Motoring.

In the 1980s it amalgamated with West Sussex College of Design and Worthing Technical College to form Northbrook College retaining its premises at Shoreham Airport, in Shoreham-by-Sea.
