= Nostalgia (Annie Lennox album) =

Studio album by Annie Lennox
- Released: 30 September 2014
- Recorded: October 2013 – mid-2014
- Studios: Sheen Lane Studios (London, UK); State of the Ark Studios (London, UK)
- Genres: Soul; jazz
- Length: 42:31
- Label: Island
- Producers: Annie Lennox; Mike Stevens

Annie Lennox chronology
A Christmas Cornucopia (2010)	Nostalgia (2014)

Singles from Nostalgia
- 1. "I Put a Spell on You" Released: 15 September 2014; 2. "Summertime" Released: 30 September 2014

Nostalgia is the sixth solo studio album by Scottish singer-songwriter Annie Lennox. It was released on 30 September 2014 by Island Records. It was Lennox's first album in four years, and her third album of covers. The album consists entirely of cover versions, mainly of compositions from the Great American Songbook originally written in the 1930s; two compositions initially date from the 1950s. The material was researched and learned by Lennox as she studied archival footage uploaded to YouTube.

Nostalgia debuted at number nine on the UK Albums Chart, becoming Lennox's sixth UK top-10 solo album. It has since been certified Gold by the BPI for sales in excess of 100,000 copies in the UK. It debuted at number 10 on the US Billboard 200 with first-week sales of 32,000 copies, earning Lennox her third top-10 solo album on the chart, as well as her first-ever number-one album on both Billboard's Jazz Albums and Traditional Jazz Albums charts. It had sold 139,000 copies in the United States as of April 2015. Nostalgia peaked inside the top ten in Austria, Canada, Italy and Switzerland. The album was nominated for Best Traditional Pop Vocal Album at the 57th Grammy Awards.

== Background and release ==
On 15 August 2014, Lennox published a blog post on her official website announcing the upcoming release of Nostalgia. She stated that the album would initially be released on vinyl LP format on 30 September 2014 as a three-week vinyl exclusive. Nostalgia was previewed to a small audience at the Hollywood Forever Cemetery in Los Angeles on 12 August 2014.

== Promotion ==
Lennox explained that she did not plan to tour as extensively as she did in support of her album Songs of Mass Destruction (2007). She told Billboard that "at this point in time, less is more for me. I'm more about quality than quantity, and I think this is quite a niche place to be."

The single "I Put a Spell on You" received its first radio play on 15 September 2014 by Ken Bruce on BBC Radio 2. Lennox performed the song at the 57th Annual Grammy Awards in 2015, and coupled with the inclusion of the track as the opening song of the film Fifty Shades of Grey, pushed it into the Billboard Hot 100 at number 97 in February 2015. It also entered the UK Singles Chart at number 63 that same month. Despite a relatively lowly chart peak, in October 2022 the single was certified Silver by the BPI denoting sales/equivalent streams of 200,000 copies in the UK, making it one of Lennox's most popular singles.

== Critical response ==
Professional ratings
Aggregate scores
Source	Rating
Metacritic	68/100
Review scores
Source	Rating
AllMusic	3.5/5 stars
The Boston Globe	Positive
Chicago Tribune	2/4 stars
The Guardian	3/5 stars
Mojo	4/5 stars
New York Daily News	3/5 stars
PopMatters	7/10
Rolling Stone	3/5 stars

Nostalgia received generally favourable reviews from critics. At Metacritic, the album has a score of 68 out of 100 based on eight reviews.

Mojo gave the album a positive review, stating it was "Straight and true, without a trace of rear-view-mirror sentimentality." Mike Wass of Idolator wrote that Lennox "breathes new life into the much-covered gems with perhaps the best vocal performance of her long and varied career", noting the assistance given by the "haunting arrangements". He stated that it would be an understatement to call the album "a departure from Annie's usual oeuvre," and that Lennox "puts her own inimitable spin" on the tracks. In a mixed review, The Guardian stated "Lennox can't hope to approach the anguish or disgust of Billie Holiday's original 'Strange Fruit', so why even try, unless you're going to totally reinvent the song like the Cocteau Twins did? Lennox is at her best when she sounds most involved, and her beautiful takes on 'Georgia on My Mind', 'God Bless the Child' and 'You Belong to Me' are full of poignancy and yearning."

== Track listing ==
No.	Title	Writer(s)	Length
1.	"Memphis in June"	Paul Francis Webster; Hoagy Carmichael	2:47
2.	"Georgia on My Mind"	Carmichael; Stuart Gorrell	3:55
3.	"I Put a Spell on You"	Screamin' Jay Hawkins	3:32
4.	"Summertime"	George Gershwin; DuBose Heyward; Ira Gershwin	5:12
5.	"I Cover the Waterfront"	Johnny Green; Edward Heyman	2:59
6.	"Strange Fruit"	Abel Meeropol	3:46
7.	"God Bless the Child"	Billie Holiday; Arthur Herzog, Jr.	3:03
8.	"You Belong to Me"	Chilton Price; Pee Wee King; Redd Stewart	3:22
9.	"September in the Rain"	Harry Warren; Al Dubin	2:53
10.	"I Can Dream, Can't I?"	Sammy Fain; Irving Kahal	2:56
11.	"The Nearness of You"	Carmichael; Ned Washington	2:32
12.	"Mood Indigo"	Duke Ellington; Barney Bigard; Irving Mills	5:34

Deluxe edition bonus DVD
No.	Title	Writer(s)	Length
1.	"Annie Lennox Discusses Nostalgia"
2.	"I Put a Spell on You" (live)	Screamin' Jay Hawkins

== Personnel ==
Credits for Nostalgia adapted from Tidal.

=== Musicians ===
- Annie Lennox - all vocals, Fender Rhodes piano, flute, organ, percussion, piano, string arrangement
- Mike Stevens - production, accordion, guitar, harmonica, keyboards, organ, vibraphone
- Chris Hill - bass guitar, double bass
- Ivan Hussey - cello
- Neal Wilkinson - drums
- Nichol Thompson - trombone
- Simon Finch - trumpet
- Stephen Hussey - viola, violin, orchestration
- Richard Brook - percussion

=== Technical ===
- Mike Stevens - production, engineering, mixing, programming, studio personnel
- Mandy Parnell - master engineer, studio personnel
- Cameron Craig - engineering, mixing, studio personnel

=== Artwork ===
- Gavin Taylor - art direction, design
- Robert Sebree - photography

== Charts ==
=== Weekly charts ===
Chart (2014)	Peak position
Australian Albums (ARIA)	16
Australian Jazz Albums (ARIA)	1
Austrian Albums (Ö3 Austria)	10
Belgian Albums (Ultratop Flanders)	45
Belgian Albums (Ultratop Wallonia)	24
Canadian Albums (Billboard)	9
Croatian Albums (HDU)	16
Czech Albums (ČNS IFPI)	17
Danish Albums (Hitlisten)	13
Dutch Albums (Album Top 100)	34
French Albums (SNEP)	75
German Albums (Offizielle Top 100)	15
Greek Albums (IFPI)	8
Irish Albums (IRMA)	16
Italian Albums (FIMI)	7
New Zealand Albums (RMNZ)	17
Norwegian Albums (VG-lista)	25
Polish Albums (ZPAV)	22
Scottish Albums (Official Charts)	7
Spanish Albums (Promusicae)	70
Swedish Albums (Sverigetopplistan)	34
Swiss Albums (Schweizer Hitparade)	8
UK Albums (Official Charts)	9
US Billboard 200	10
US Top Jazz Albums (Billboard)	1

=== Year-end charts ===
Chart (2014)	Position
Australian Jazz Albums (ARIA)	4
UK Albums (OCC)	71
US Top Jazz Albums (Billboard)	3

Chart (2015)	Position
Australian Jazz Albums (ARIA)	10
US Top Jazz Albums (Billboard)	3

Chart (2016)	Position
Australian Jazz Albums (ARIA)	39

== Certifications ==
Region	Certification	Certified units/sales
United Kingdom (BPI)	Gold	100,000^{*}
^{*} Sales figures based on certification alone.

== Release history ==
Region	Date	Format(s)	Edition	Label	Ref.
United States	30 September 2014	LP	Standard	Blue Note	
United States	21 October 2014	CD + DVD	Limited (Amazon exclusive)	Blue Note	
United States	21 October 2014	Digital download	Standard	Blue Note	
Germany	24 October 2014	CD; LP; digital download	Standard	Universal	
Germany	24 October 2014	CD + DVD	Deluxe	Universal	
France	27 October 2014	CD; digital download	Standard	Universal	
France	27 October 2014	Digital download	Deluxe	Universal	
United Kingdom	27 October 2014	CD; LP; digital download	Standard	Island	
United Kingdom	27 October 2014	CD + DVD; digital download	Deluxe	Island	
Australia	31 October 2014	CD; digital download	Standard	Universal	
Australia	31 October 2014	Digital download	Deluxe	Universal	
