= Henry Ramsden Bramley =

English clergyman and hymnologist

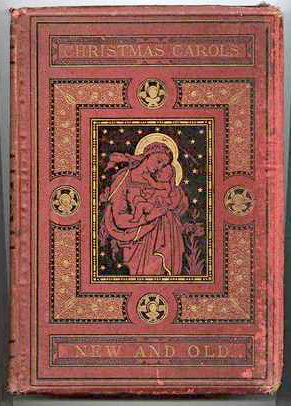
Christmas Carols, New and Old

Henry Ramsden Bramley (4 June 1833 – February 1917) was an English clergyman and hymnologist perhaps best known for his collaborations with the composer Sir John Stainer. Along with earlier 19th-century composers such as William Sandys and John Mason Neale, Bramley and Stainer are credited with fuelling a Victorian revival of Christmas carols with their 1871 publication of Christmas Carols, New and Old, which popularised carols such as "The First Nowell", "God Rest You Merry, Gentlemen" and "The Holly and the Ivy".

Bramley and John Stainer published the Christmas Carols, New and Old, with a total of 20 carols, sometime in the 1860s. By 1871, the second series of 22 carols came out bringing the total to 42. A third series – with 28 carols – was issued in 1878, expanding the collection to 70 carols, second only to R. R. Chope's Carols for Use In Church in the number of carols it contained.

== Early life and education ==
Henry Ramsden Bramley was born on 4 June 1833 at Addingham in Yorkshire. He studied at Oriel College, Oxford (1852), and was later made a fellow of Magdalen College, Oxford, in 1857.

== Ordination ==
Bramley was ordained in the Church of England as a deacon in 1856, and priest in 1858. He served as Vicar of Horspath in Oxfordshire between 1861 and 1889, and was later Canon and Precentor of Lincoln Cathedral between 1895-1905. Theologically, he is described in Professor Jeremy Dibble's biography of John Stainer as a "High Church conservative".

== Published works ==
Bramley became acquainted with John Stainer after the composer was appointed organist at Magdalen College in 1860. Indeed it was Bramley, as a fellow of the college, who presented Stainer with his doctoral robes. Bramley and John Stainer published the first series of the Christmas Carols, New and Old, with a total of 20 Christmas carols, sometime in the 1860s. It was revised and expanded at regular intervals over the next few years. Bramley acted as the textual editor, contributing a number of new Latin translations and original verses to the publication, while Stainer dealt with the music, writing a number of new arrangements. By 1871, the second series of 22 carols came out bringing the total to 42. A third series – with 28 carols – was issued in 1878. The 1878 edition of the Christmas Carols, New and Old contained 70 carols. Amongst these were a number of now-standard carols which the collection helped to popularise including "The First Nowell", "God Rest You Merry, Gentlemen", "The Seven Joys of Mary", "See, Amid the Winter's Snow", "Once In Royal David's City", "The Apple Wassail", "The Holly and the Ivy" and "What Child Is This?".

William Studwell and Dorothy Jones note that the book, with an informative preface, an index with information on the origin of the carol texts and illustrations by the Brothers Dalziel caught the mood of the time, and was both "an artistic and commercial success". Percy Dearmer, writing in the preface to the Oxford Book of Carols of 1928, goes further, noting that the publication was largely responsible for the 19th-century Victorian revival of the Christmas carol:

"The influence of this book was enormous: it placed in the hands of the clergy...a really practicable tool, which came into general use, and is still in use after nearly sixty years. The great service done by this famous collection was that it brought thirteen traditional carols, with their proper music, into general use at once...It is…mainly to Bramley and Stainer that we owe the restoration of the carol."

Studwell and Jones note that despite his numerous appointments, Christmas Carols, New and Old was Bramley's only influential publication. His only other publication of any substance was his translation of The Psalter: or Psalms of David and Certain Canticles of 1884, itself based on a work by 13th-century Bible translator Richard Rolle. His other published works (with the exception of a few publications related to Oxford University administration) include a hymn, "The Great God of Heaven is Come Down to Earth", included in the English Hymnal of 1906, and his new translation and expansion of the Latin carol "The Cradle Song of the Blessed Virgin", with music by Joseph Barnby.

Bramley also wrote a poem, "O Thou the Central Orb" in 1873 at the request of Frederick Ouseley as a text to fit a 1619 verse anthem by Orlando Gibbons, "O all true faithful hearts". Gibbons' original anthem was composed in thanksgiving for the recovery of King James VI and I from illness; Bramley's replacement text makes poetic reference to the divine radiance of God. A new choral setting of "O Thou the Central Orb" was subsequently composed by Charles Wood and published in 1933 in The Church Anthem Book. While Wood's rousing setting has become a very popular work in the repertoire of Anglican church music, it has been suggested that Bramley's words ultimately "don't mean anything at all."

== Personal life and death ==
Bramley never married. His sister Ann lived with him at Nettleham Hall for 17 years following the death of her husband, the Rev. James Stewart Gammell, previously Vicar of Outwood (Yorkshire) where Bramley's parents were interred.

Henry Ramsden Bramley died on 28 January 1917 in Lincoln.

== Works ==
- S. Gregorii Magni Regulae pastoralis liber: the Benedictine text, with an English translation (1874)
- Christmas Carols, New and Old with John Stainer (1878)
- Meditations and Prayers upon the seven words of our Lord Jesus Christ from the Cross (1880)
- The Psalter: or Psalms of David and certain canticles (1884)
