= British School of Motoring =

British driving school

BSM
- Type: Private Limited
- Industry: Automotive services
- Founded: Peckham, United Kingdom
- Services: Driving instruction
- Website: www.bsm.co.uk

The British School of Motoring (BSM) is a driving school in the United Kingdom, providing training in vehicle operation and road safety.

BSM has around 1,000 driving instructors. RAC's parent company, Aviva, sold BSM to Arques Industries AG in February 2009. In November 2009 the business was then sold to Managing Directors Abu-Haris Shafi and Nikolai Kesting and was then acquired by Acromas Holdings, which was the holding company for The AA and Saga in January 2011. The AA (including BSM ownership) then announced stock market flotation in June 2014.

== Founder ==
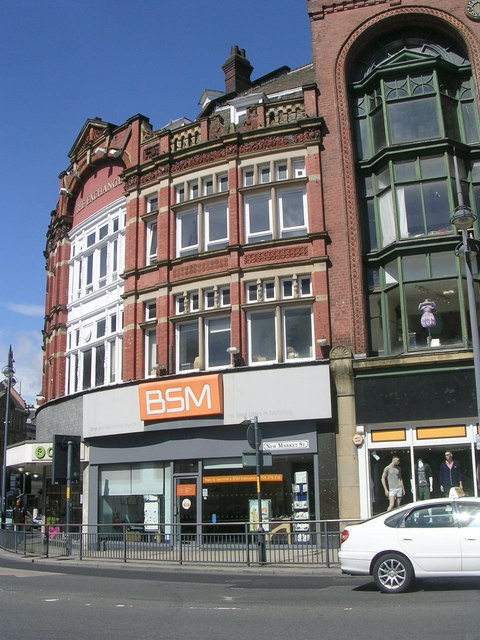
BSM offices in Leeds in 2010.

British School of Motoring founded in 1910 was an independent and private educational organisation like the Chelsea College of Aeronautical and Automobile Engineering founded in 1924. Both were founded by their principal, S C H Roberts. Born in 1889 Stanley Coryton Hugh Roberts (known as "C H") died in September 1957 and was succeeded as managing director of both BSM and The College of Aeronautical and Automobile Engineering by Miss Denise McCann.
