= Sydney Street =

Historic street in Chelsea, London, England

Coordinates: 51.48946°N 0.17008°W

Sydney Street is a historic street in Chelsea, London, in the Royal Borough of Kensington and Chelsea. Running north to south between Fulham Road and King's Road, it forms part of the historic residential district of Chelsea. The street is characterised by Georgian and Victorian architecture, traditional terraced houses, listed buildings and a mixture of residential, commercial and institutional premises.

Situated in one of London's most affluent residential neighbourhoods, Sydney Street combines a predominantly residential character with proximity to the shops, restaurants and amenities of King's Road and Fulham Road. Its architectural and historical landmarks include the Grade I-listed Church of St Luke, the Royal Brompton Hospital and several groups of Grade II-listed buildings.

== History ==
Sydney Street forms part of the historic development of Chelsea, much of which underwent substantial residential expansion during the nineteenth century. The surrounding Chelsea Conservation Area contains buildings and secondary streets laid out predominantly between the early nineteenth century and the 1950s.

The street retains much of the traditional urban character of this period, with a mixture of formal terraces, institutional buildings and later residential developments. Its position between Fulham Road and King's Road has historically connected two of Chelsea's principal commercial thoroughfares.

== Architecture ==
Sydney Street contains several groups of listed buildings, predominantly dating from the nineteenth century. The architectural character of the street includes yellow stock-brick terraces, stucco decoration, sash windows and traditional Georgian and Victorian detailing.

Among the most prominent architectural groups is the terrace at Nos. 18–68, which is Grade II listed. Other listed properties include Nos. 1–5, Nos. 4–8, Nos. 7–67 and Nos. 12–16.

The street's architectural character is complemented by the Church of St Luke, which occupies a prominent position and is one of the area's principal historic landmarks.

== Notable buildings and institutions ==
=== Church of St Luke ===

The Church of St Luke is a Grade I-listed Anglican church designed by architect James Savage and completed in 1824. Constructed in the Gothic Revival style using Bath stone, it features flying buttresses, an arcaded western entrance and a tower approximately 142 feet (43 metres) high.

The church has notable literary associations. Charles Dickens married Catherine Hogarth there on 2 April 1836. The novelist Charles Kingsley was also associated with the parish, where his father served as rector.

The former churchyard was converted into a public garden in 1881 and formally opened by the Countess Cadogan in the same year. The gravestones were repositioned to form a boundary wall, which remains a feature of the gardens.

=== Royal Brompton Hospital ===
The Royal Brompton Hospital is a specialist hospital situated on Sydney Street and neighbouring roads. Founded in 1841, it developed into a major centre for the treatment of diseases affecting the heart and lungs. It is internationally recognised for its specialist clinical services, research and medical expertise.

=== Chelsea College of Aeronautical and Automobile Engineering ===
The Chelsea College of Aeronautical and Automobile Engineering formerly occupied premises at No. 102 Sydney Street. The institution specialised in automobile and aeronautical engineering. Its former premises are now known as Scorpio House.

== Cultural and social history ==
=== Catherine Walker and British royal fashion ===
Sydney Street was the original home of the British couture house established by fashion designer Catherine Walker. In 1976, Walker founded the Chelsea Design Company at No. 65 Sydney Street, with her husband and business partner, Said Cyrus. The business initially specialised in children's clothing before expanding into womenswear, eveningwear and bespoke couture.

Walker became particularly renowned for her longstanding professional relationship with Diana, Princess of Wales, whom she dressed for nearly two decades. Beginning in the early 1980s, Walker designed numerous outfits for the Princess, including formal daywear, evening gowns and clothing for official engagements. She became one of the Princess's most trusted designers and was responsible for many of her best-known outfits.

Following Walker's death in 2010, the fashion house continued under the Catherine Walker & Co name. The company subsequently established a relationship with Catherine, Princess of Wales, continuing its association with the British Royal Family across two generations of Princesses of Wales.

== Gay history ==
Sydney Street also features in accounts of London's historical male social and commercial scene during the 1980s. An article published in Village Magazine in April 2019 by journalist Joseph de Búrca, documenting the recollections of Alan Kerr, identifies a male brothel operating on Sydney Street during this period.

According to Kerr's account, the establishment was operated by a Thai man who was associated with another Thai proprietor, known as Peter, who ran the Earl's Court Clinic, a male brothel at 51 Longridge Road in Earl's Court. The two establishments were described as forming part of a wider network of male commercial establishments operating in west London during the period.

The account provides a relatively unusual historical reference to the presence of male-oriented establishments in Chelsea and the wider underground male social scene in west London during the twentieth century.

== Notable residents ==
Sydney Street has been home to several notable figures associated with Victorian literature, scholarship and the arts.

- Thomas Wright (1810–1877) – English antiquarian, historian and author, lived at No. 14 Sydney Street. His residence is documented in correspondence dating from 1858, 1862 and 1871. Wright was a Fellow of the Society of Antiquaries and a founding member of the British Archaeological Association.
- George Edward Biber (1801–1874) – German-born writer and Anglican clergyman, author of The Life of Pestalozziand editor of the newspaper John Bull, resided in Sydney Street.
- Henry Warren (1794–1879) – Victorian painter, draughtsman and illustrator, lived for a period opposite St Luke's Church, according to George Bryan's 1869 history of Chelsea.

== Location and surroundings ==
Sydney Street connects Fulham Road to the north with King's Road to the south. The street is located within the wider Chelsea neighbourhood, with access to the area's shops, restaurants, public gardens and cultural amenities.

St Luke's Gardens, situated beside the church, provides public green space within the surrounding residential area. The street is also close to Chelsea's established retail and commercial districts along King's Road and Fulham Road.
