= Finest Kind =

Canadian folk music trio

Finest Kind is a folk music trio based in Ottawa, Ontario, Canada. It consists of Ian Robb, Ann Downey and Shelley Posen. The band is known for its three-part harmony renditions of traditional folk songs.

== History ==
Finest Kind formed in the early 1990s. The band has released six albums in its own name, including Heart's Delight in 1999 and Silks & Spices in 2004. The three also recorded a Christmas album with Canadian actor John D. Huston. Individually, its members have appeared on several solo albums and play with other bands.

Finest Kind performed throughout North America and the United Kingdom for folk song societies, community groups, and at folk festivals, including the Ottawa Folk Festival.

In 2014, Finest Kind performed at the Canadian Folk Music Awards gala in Ottawa. The band retired from touring in 2015. It continues to perform an annual Christmas concert and other engagements in the Ottawa area.

== CD recordings ==
- Lost in a Song 1996
- Heart's Delight 1999
- Silks and Spices 2004
- Feasts & Spirits (with John D. Huston) 2004
- For Honour and For Gain 2010
- From Shore to Shore 2014
