= Fisheries-induced evolution =

Evolution of fishes driven by the fishery industry

External videos
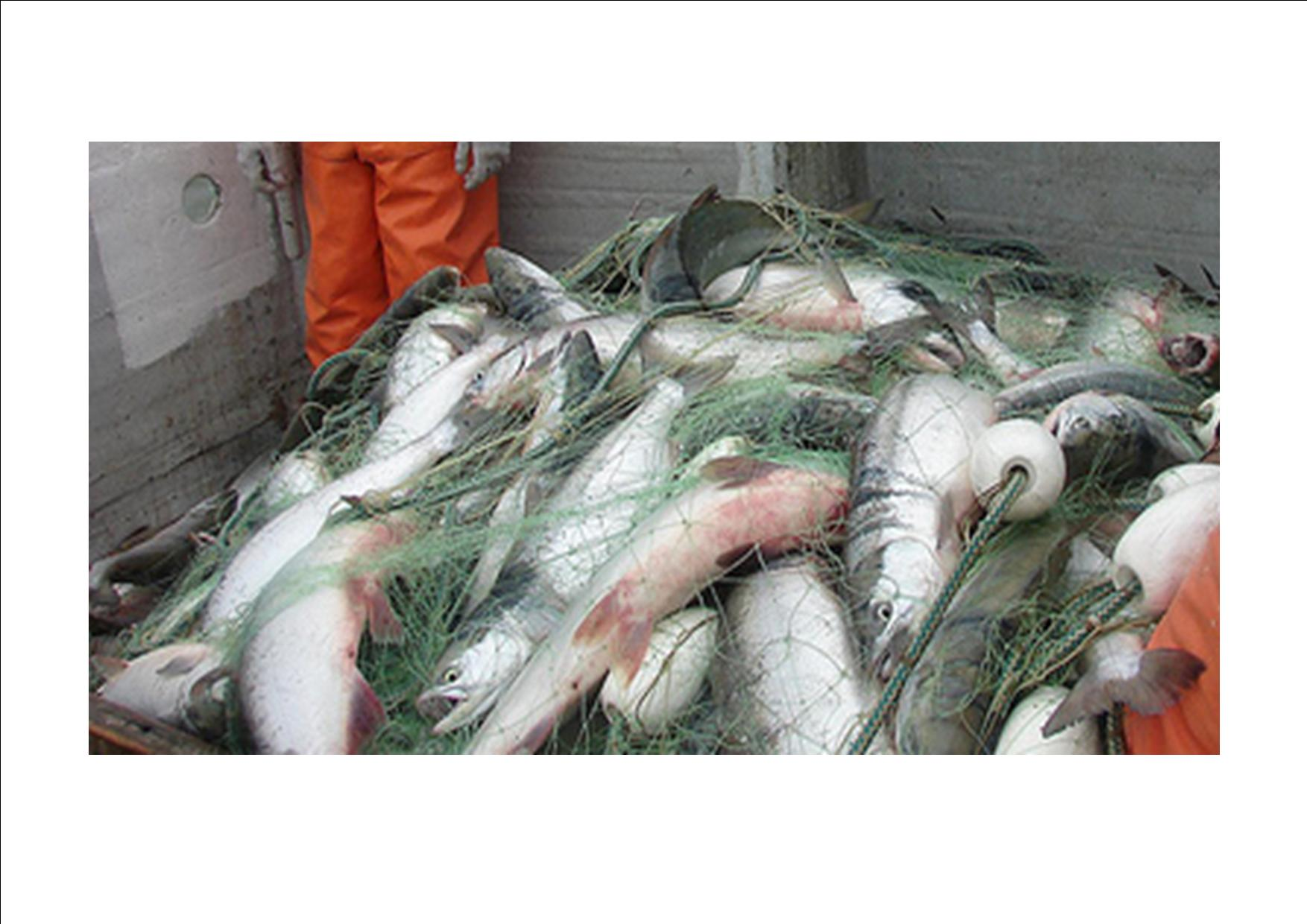
- "How humans shift fish evolution" with Mikko Heino, Knowable Magazine, February 27, 2020.

Fisheries-induced evolution (FIE) is the microevolution of an exploited aquatic organism's population, brought on through the artificial selection for biological traits by fishing practices (fishing techniques and fisheries management). Fishing, of any severity or effort, will impose an additional layer of mortality to the natural population equilibrium and will be selective to certain genetic traits within that organism's gene pool. This removal of selected traits fundamentally changes the population gene frequency, resulting in the artificially induced microevolution by the proxy of the survival of untargeted fish and their propagation of heritable biological characteristics. This artificial selection often counters natural life-history pattern for many species, such as causing early sexual maturation, diminished sizes for matured fish, and reduced fecundity in the form of smaller egg size, lower sperm counts and viability during reproductive events. These effects can have prolonged effects on the adaptability or fitness of the species to their environmental factors.

Fisheries-induced evolution differs from the Darwinian evolution model by virtue of the direct human factor. For FIE, fishing enforces a greater selection pressure for traits, often through sheer effort and catch numbers, which can disparage natural selection pressures such as predator-prey interactions and environmental influences.

== Causes ==
Fishing practices that permanently remove animals from their population (i.e. not catch and release) drive direct fisheries-induced evolution by removing the genetic materials of those animals from the population. Individuals that are untargeted, through the selection bias of fishing gears and/or legislation, are allowed to reproduce and proliferate their genetic materials. As fishing pressures persist, traits belonging to non-selected organisms are preserved through survival and become more dominant in frequency within the gene pool. Additionally, fishing on a targeted species incur knock-on effects to those around it by its disturbance of their natural interactions. In these situations, specific traits of the untargeted species may be favourable under the diminutive presence, or absence, of the targeted species, and therefore indirectly selected for.

=== Direct selection ===
The direct selection for biological traits through fishery practices is the result of fishery management regulations, and gear restrictions and selectivities. The most obvious artificial selection for traits through management legislation can be observed in the imposed regulations on size (minimum landing size), sex, seasonality, and locations. There is also an evidence that various types of fishing gears directly select on traits that make individual fish more likely to be captured, including aspects of their behavior (e.g. boldness, activity level) and physiology (e.g. anaerobic capacity, swimming ability). Considerable variation in how fishery selection functions is likely, with selection on some traits existing in some conditions but disappearing in others.

Catch size regulations vary with specificity to the targeted species and is often used to prevent exploitation during a specific part of the life cycle for the organism. Such regulations arose in response to the effects of FIE observed by the fisheries of Atlantic Cod (Gadus morhua). Prior to the fishing technological revolution that has led to the species moratorium, the exploitation of Atlantic Cod have been selective towards larger-sized fish since the 1500s. Catch data for the species have quantitatively shown that this selectivity for larger fish for over 500 years have shifted the life-history patterns, resulting in earlier sexual maturation and smaller sizes at said maturation.

Sexual selectivity by a fishery works on the theoretical foundation that the preservation of females allows their reproductive input to offset the fishing mortality. Fisheries of species with low fecundity such as mud crabs (Scylla serrata) and blue swimmer crabs (Portunus armatus) often adopt this method and only allow the harvesting of males. The direct selection for traits, with respect to sex selectivity, occurs when specific characteristics or behaviours increase the susceptibility of the organisms for harvest. For example, corkwing wrasses (Symphodus melops) are harvested as a biological control for sea lice within farmed salmon facilities of the northern hemisphere. Male fish dominate these wild fisheries in both catch per unit effort and weight owing to their strong nesting behaviour and territorial nature, which differentiate them from females and sneaker males. Persistent fishing pressures over the years have reduced maturation age and size for these nesting males, in addition to increasing the density of sneaker males to the detriment of the localised population.

=== Indirect selection ===
Indirect fishery-induced evolution occurs when a species with some level of ecological significance is targeted by a fishery, and their diminished presence within the ecology causes a flow on effect to other untargeted species. Keystone or umbrella species provide many ecological services to the environment which they belong to, ranging from the provision of habitat and food, to the control of biodiversity by preventing any one organism from dominating. Removal or reduction of these organisms often cause significant changes to the behaviours and physiology of the organisms which were once controlled.

Non-migratory reef sharks (Carcharhinus melanopterus, C. amblyrhynchos, and Triaenodon obesus) play the vital role in weeding out sick and ill-adapted individuals from within a population, in addition to controlling the abundance of larger size fish. Thus, these sharks are an ever-present mortality factor for many reef organisms. Fisheries targeting these apex predators inherently allow for the proliferation of medium-sized predatory fishes (e.g. barracudas, juvenile groupers, trevallies, snappers) at the expense of the cohabiting smaller species. When this happen, the FIE responses observed from smaller species have been consistent with their increasing egg production and shifted life-history for early sexual maturation.

Another example of FIE that is instigated indirectly can be seen in the ornamental or aquarium trade industry. In particular, corals and anemones are highly prized ornamental commodities and are often harvested at unsustainable rates for profit within the Malay archipelago. Removal of anemones at rates higher than their resettlement into the reefs, as observed in the Philippines, is known to have caused drastic reduction in the localised population of clownfish or anemonefish (Amphiprion sp.). Evolutionarily, anemone fish observed on reefs that were subjected to intense and prolonged anemone fishing were significantly smaller, even for mature adult pairs, than those found living with an anemone. This size reduction is attributed to their need to hide in small coral crevices in the absence of a host.

== Evidence ==
Outside of observational data collected from active fisheries, the evidence for fisheries-induced evolution, or its symptoms, may be discerned through both commercial and recreational anecdotes. These stories often articulate the diminishing catch, reduction in their weight and length records, in addition to the mandatory increase to fishing efforts over time to attain similar fishing quotas to their historical references. However, experimental data was needed to clarify two fundamental questions regarding FIE, so that the aforementioned ramifications of smaller sizes and early maturation may not be attributed to non-anthropogenic factors such as population flux. The two evidentiary questions: a) Is fishing pressure capable of changing the gene frequency of a population to cause microevolution within such a short time frame? b) How can non-selective fishing gears (gill nets and trawlers) be selective for certain traits?

=== Experimental evidence ===
The implementation of aquaculture experimental designs afford the possibility of isolating different biological traits and observing their impacts and heredity within a population.

A study by Solberg et al. (2013) demonstrated that with sufficient fishing pressure and selectivity, a substantial change to a population genotype may be achieved without the geological time-frame often associated with evolution. In this study, Atlantic salmon (Salmo salar) were subjected to a modified 'common garden' design, and the researchers isolated stress as an abiotic independent variable to the growth rates of salmon. By selecting for fish with a lower biological response to stress, a domesticated population was created within 10 generations of breeding, which exhibited a threefold increase in growth rate over its wild counterpart. Thus, the difference between the absence of larger fish, which can be misattributed to overfishing, and FIE lies in the inherited biological characteristics that were untargeted by fishing.

Fishing techniques such as gill nets and trawling are often associated with a lack of selectivity within the environment which they are operated. It is difficult to establish whether selectivity can occur under these practices, when fishing data suggest that an entire localised population may be caught or up to 80% of the effort to go to bycatches and not the targeted species. An experiment by Biro and Post (2008) shows that despite being mechanically unselective of gill nets, behavioural variation in certain fish species can indeed affect the likelihood of them being caught and therefore be a function for selectivity. Using a 'selection experiment in the field' model, two genotypes of rainbow trouts (Oncorhynchus mykiss) were transplanted into identical artificial lake habitats and subjected to matching gill net fishing pressures. The net in question were designed to capture all size variability within the simulated populations. Trouts exhibiting the genotypes for faster growth rates and therefore a more active lifestyle were found to have a 60% increase chance to be caught in comparison to those characterised by the more sedentary genotype. Therefore, for 'non-selective' fishing methods, the selecting factor rests not on the gear itself but on the inherent behavioural variations within the population.

== Implications ==
Fisheries-induced evolution is a function of the fishing-induced genetic drift, and to some extent represent the reduction of genetic diversity within the targeted population. For many exploited population, this reduction in genetic diversity has been predicted to reduce their adaptability to both environmental variability and ecological competitiveness. Indeed, the commonly observed fisheries-induced adaptation of younger and smaller size at sexual maturation counter specific life-history characteristics that would enable interspecies competition for resources. A biological model by Kindsvater and Palkovacs (2017) shows that FIE Atlantic cod, due to their smaller sizes, actually belong to a lower trophic level irrespective of their original position prior to the species moratorium. Furthermore, the FIE effect of reducing egg counts and their viability have weakened the number of recruitments back into the population after spawning, thereby reducing the localised population density. However, at the reduced population abundance and smaller sizes, the increase in per capita resource has been stipulated to counteract the effects of competitions between different species by reducing intraspecific interactions, which can allow for maximal density-dependent growth to happen. This also means that for harvesting to be sustainable, yearly or seasonal assessment of viable reproductive stocks and their recruitment rates must be performed to account for the compromised fecundity and recovery statuses.

There is limited data on the interactions between FIE affected species and their robustness to environmental fluctuations. For many species, the additional mortality rate and the frequency of harvesting exerted by the fisheries make it difficult to elucidate how environmental factors such as temperatures, salinity and currents can be beneficial or detrimental for stocks, since their effects on deaths or recruitment gains are diminutive in comparison. However, with the rapidly evolving climates stemming from the anthropogenic inputs, an understanding of how FIE affects the adaptability of these aquatic population will be necessary, not only for future stock assessments, but also sustainable harvesting.
