= See, amid the Winter's Snow =

Christmas carol

Song
- Published: 1858
- Genre: Christmas carol
- Composer: John Goss
- Lyricist: Edward Caswall

"See, amid the Winter's Snow", also known as "The Hymn for Christmas", is an English Christmas carol, written by Edward Caswall and first published in 1858. In 1871 Sir John Goss composed a hymn tune for it, "Humility", and as "Hymn for Christmas Day", it was included in Christmas Carols New and Old, the anthology edited by Henry Ramsden Bramley and John Stainer.

== History ==
Caswall wrote "See, amid the winter's snow" shortly after converting from the Church of England to the Roman Catholic Church and joining the Oratory of Saint Philip Neri. The hymn was published earliest in 1858 as part of The Masque of Mary and Other Poems by Caswall. In 1871, John Goss wrote the tune "Humility" specifically for the carol. Later in the year, Bramley and Stainer selected "See, amid the winter's snow" to be published nationwide in their Christmas Carols Old and New as one of the carols that had "proved their hold upon the popular mind". While the carol became popular, a number of verses were cut from later publications. This includes the original final verse about the Virgin Mary, which was often cut out of non-Catholic hymnals.

The artist Edward Dalziel used the words of this hymn below his engraving of the English downland with animals, even though the engraving did not have any snow in it.

The tune has been re-used in a variety of social protest and union songs in the late 20th century, beginning with "Coal, Not Dole", written in the mid-1980s by Kay Sutcliffe about the closing of the Kent coal fields to a tune by Paul Abrahams, but later reset to Goss's tune at the suggestion of John Tams and recorded by Coope Boyes and Simpson. Shelley Posen wrote "No More Fish, No Fishermen" in 1996 about the end of the cod fishery in Newfoundland. Australian John Warner wrote "Bring out the Banners" on the 150th anniversary of Australia's eight-hour work day rule in 1996.

== Composition and analysis ==
"See, amid the winter's snow" was initially composed with seven verses of four lines with a chorus after each one. The chorus' line calls for the listener to "sing through all Jerusalem, Christ is born in Bethlehem". Several hymnbooks do not contain all seven verses. Goss gave advice in the music that the carol would be best performed solo by a "Treble or Tenor or, alternatively". The writer J. R. Watson commented on study of the hymn that was an example of Caswell's objectivity. He also stated that the hymn develops a dialogue with the singers and the shepherds collectively rather than individually. Aled Jones commented that the usage of snow in the carol was a message of purity against the sins of the world.

== Lyrics ==
The lyrics to this carol's usage in the majority of hymnals are as follows:

See, amid the winter's snow,
Born for us on Earth below,
See, the tender Lamb appears,
Promised from eternal years.

Chorus
Hail, thou ever blessed morn,
Hail redemption's happy dawn,
Sing through all Jerusalem,
Christ is born in Bethlehem.

Lo, within a manger lies
He who built the starry skies;
He who, throned in height sublime,
Sits among the cherubim.
Chorus

Say, ye holy shepherds, say,
What your joyful news today;
Wherefore have ye left your sheep
On the lonely mountain steep?
Chorus

"As we watched at dead of night,
Lo, we saw a wondrous light:
Angels singing 'Peace On Earth'
Told us of the Saviour's birth."
Chorus

Sacred Infant, all divine,
What a tender love was Thine,
Thus to come from highest bliss
Down to such a world as this.
Chorus

Teach, O teach us, Holy Child,
By Thy face so meek and mild,
Teach us to resemble Thee,
In Thy sweet humility.
Chorus

Virgin Mother, Mary blest
By the joys that fill thy breast,
Pray for us, that we may prove
Worthy of the Saviour's love.
Chorus

== See also ==
- List of Christmas carols
