= Mike Stevens (saxophonist) =

English musician (born 1957)

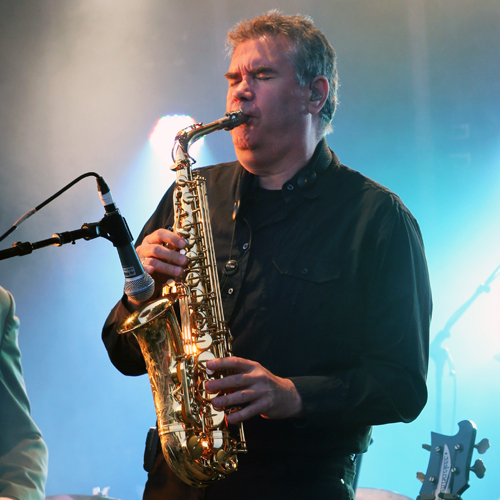
- Stevens performing with 10cc in 2013

Background information
- Born: Michael William Stevens; 26 January 1957 (age 69); Wisbech, Cambridgeshire, England
- Occupation: Musical director
- Instruments: Saxophone, keyboards, guitar, vocals
- Years active: 1980s–present

Michael William Stevens (born 26 January 1957) is an English musician. He is best known as Take That's musical director.

== Biography ==
Born in Wisbech, Cambridgeshire, Stevens began music lessons on the clarinet and piano and was encouraged by his father, a professional drummer. Stevens studied composing and conducting at the Birmingham School of Music between 1975 and 1979 before working on cruise ships as a "performer". In the 1980s, he moved to London and became a sought-after saxophonist; he was signed to RCA Records in the United States and began touring with artists such as Barry White, Brenda Russell, Dionne Warwick and the Temptations. In the late 1980s to the early 1990s, he was part of the dance music trio L.A. Mix, whose seven singles all charted on the UK Singles Chart. In 1988, he toured with Bill Withers, eventually becoming Withers's musical director.

In 1992, Stevens was hired to work with newly formed pop group Take That, becoming their musical director the following year. He toured with the group until their split in 1996, playing keyboards, saxophone and guitar as well as providing backing vocals. His work with Take That made him an in-demand musical director for other touring pop groups; he subsequently directed Eurythmics, Mika, Sugababes, James Morrison, Will Young, Geri Halliwell, Boyzone, B*Witched, 911 and Five. Upon Take That's reformation in 2006, Stevens was re-hired as their musical director, employing musicians such as guitarist Milton McDonald, bassist Lee Pomeroy, drummer Donovan Hepburn, and keyboard players Bernie Smith and Marcus Byrne to create the live band.

Stevens was a member of 10cc from 1999 to 2007 and from 2011 to 2016, playing keyboards, saxophone, bass and guitar.

Stevens has been Annie Lennox's musical director and producer since 2002, producing the gold-certified albums A Christmas Cornucopia (2010) and Nostalgia (2014), both of which charted in the top ten of the UK and US album charts. Nostalgia was nominated for the Grammy Award for Best Traditional Pop Vocal Album at the 57th Annual Grammy Awards in 2014.

In 2012, Stevens led the house band and was musical director for the Diamond Jubilee Concert at Buckingham Palace, and two years later directed Jeff Lynne's ELO at BBC Radio 2's Hyde Park festival in 2014, using the Take That/Gary Barlow band and the BBC Concert Orchestra to accompany Lynne and Richard Tandy. Stevens had previously worked with Lynne at the Children in Need Rocks 2013 concert, where Lynne and Tandy performed "Livin' Thing" and "Mr. Blue Sky" accompanied by Stevens and the Take That/Gary Barlow band. He has toured with Jeff Lynne's ELO since 2014, using a similar band to the Hyde Park concert, and he plays rhythm guitar himself.

Stevens has supervised or performed at events such as Live 8 in London, The Nelson Mandela 90th Birthday Tribute Concert, and concerts for The Prince's Trust.

== Solo discography ==
- 1988—Light Up the Night
- 1990—Set the Spirit Free
- 1995—Joy
