= Praise, my soul, the King of heaven =

19th century Christian hymn

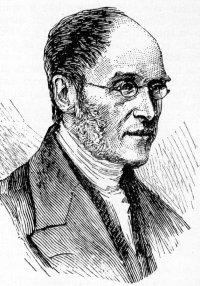
- Henry Francis Lyte
- Genre: Hymn
- Written: 1834
- Text: Henry Francis Lyte
- Based on: Psalm 103
- Meter: 8.7.8.7.8.7
- Melody: "Lauda Anima" by John Goss, "Regent Square" by Henry T. Smart

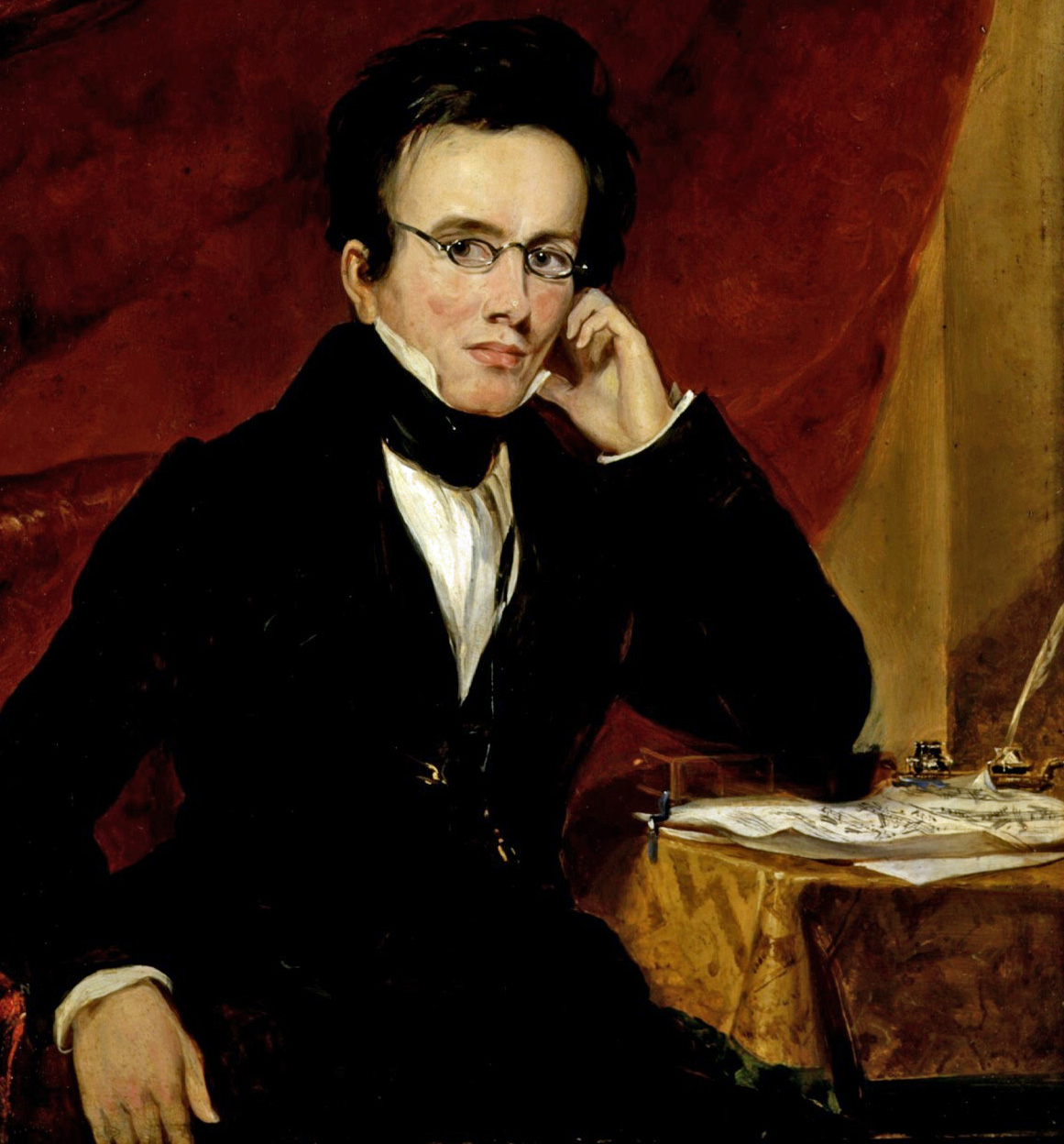
John Goss

"Praise, my soul, the King of heaven" is a Christian hymn. Its text, which draws from Psalm 103, was written by Anglican divine Henry Francis Lyte. First published in 1834, it endures in modern hymnals to a setting written by John Goss in 1868, and remains one of the most popular hymns in English-speaking denominations.

== History ==
The text of the hymn was first published in Lyte's The Spirit of the Psalms (1834), a publication intended for the use of his own congregation in southern England. It appeared in multiple influential publications, such as Hymns Ancient and Modern (1861) and The English Hymnal (1906). It remains extremely popular and John Richard Watson notes that "it is hard to find a major hymnbook that does not include it".

The hymn is frequently sung in the United Kingdom and was used in the 1947 royal wedding of Princess Elizabeth, later Queen Elizabeth II, and Prince Philip, Duke of Edinburgh. It was also used as the opening hymn at the 2018 funeral of former U.S. President George H. W. Bush. It was one of two hymns sung at the Coronation of Charles III and Camilla.

== Text ==
The text is a free paraphrase of Psalm 103. While, in the mid-nineteenth century, hymn writers usually kept their metrical settings of psalm texts as close as possible to the original, Lyte instead decided to maintain the spirit of the words while freely paraphrasing them. The result speaks, in an imaginative fashion, with "beautiful imagery and thoughtful prose", of themes such as the Love of God, healing and forgiveness, including the repeated exclamations "Praise Him!", in what is a spectacular rhetorical statement of praise.

In modern versions, Lyte's text has been frequently altered. One common variant, which originates in the 1861 Hymns Ancient and Modern collection, is replacing the line "Praise Him! Praise Him!" with "Alleluia!".

Praise, my soul, the King of heaven,
to his feet thy tribute bring;
ransomed healed, restored, forgiven,
who like me his praise should sing?
Praise him, praise him,
praise the everlasting King.

Praise him for his grace and favour
to our fathers in distress;
praise him still the same for ever,
slow to chide and swift to bless:
Praise him, praise him,
glorious in his faithfulness.

Father-like, he tends and spares us,
well our feeble frame he knows;
in his hands he gently bears us,
rescues us from all our foes:
Praise him, praise him,
widely as his mercy flows.

Frail as summer's flower we flourish;
blows the wind and it is gone;
but, while mortals rise and perish,
God endures unchanging on:
Praise him, praise him,
praise the high eternal One.

Angels, help us to adore him;
ye behold him face to face;
sun and moon bow down before him,
dwellers all in time and space:
Praise him, praise him,
praise with us the God of grace.

— Hymns Ancient and Modern (2013)

The original fourth stanza ("Frail as summer's flower"), corresponding with verses 15–17 of the Psalm, was marked for optional omission in the original printing and many modern hymnals therefore do not include it. The text of the omitted stanza shares a "valedictory but hopeful tone" with the other well known hymn by Lyte, "Abide with me".

Other more modern changes, including more gender-neutral language, (Note: Such as in stanza two, where "To our fathers" is sometimes replaced with "To our forebears" or other variants) are relatively minor. An alternate text, written as part of the 1980s and 1990s attempts to reduce the omnipresence of masculine metaphors for God and published as a variant in the Presbyterian Hymnal, begins "Praise my soul, the God of heaven".

== Tune ==
The hymn is most commonly sung to the tune "Lauda Anima" ("Praise, my soul"), written as a setting for Lyte's words by John Goss in 1868, and first published in Robert Brown-Borthwick's Supplemental Hymn and Tune Book (Third edition, 1869). This was an instant success, a report in the 1869 Musical Times stating that "it is at once the most beautiful and dignified hymn tune which has lately come under our notice". Ian Bradley notes that the tune is one of "the most enduring and effective Victorian hymn tunes". The original setting by Goss is in D major. The first stanza is marked to be sung in unison with harmonies from the organ. The second is in four-part harmony (transcribed below), while the remaining stanzas are again in unison. A version in F-sharp minor was also composed for the original fourth stanza (now regularly omitted) in November 1868. (Note: An example of this rare appearance is in the 1971 Canadian Hymn Book.)

An alternative tune is "Regent Square", originally written by Henry Smart for "Glory be to God the Father" by Horatius Bonar.
