= Shelley Posen =

Canadian folklorist, singer, and songwriter

- Born: Toronto, Ontario, Canada
- Education: PhD University of Pennsylvania
- Occupation: Curator of Canadian Folklife (ret'd)
- Employer: Canadian Museum of History
- Known for: Finest Kind, columnist for Sing Out!
- Children: A daughter, Mika Posen, and a son, Samuel Posen.

Shelley (I. Sheldon) Posen is a Canadian folklorist, singer and songwriter, a member of the folk trio Finest Kind, and a former writer of the 'Songfinder' column for Sing Out! In the 1970s, while still a graduate student, he was the Director of Mariposa in the Schools. He conducted fieldwork and recorded traditional songs extensively in the Ottawa Valley. He was Curator of Canadian Folklife at the Canadian Museum of Civilization/Canadian Museum of History from 2001 to 2015. He has written on traditional song, Canadian sports and cultural heroes, and the folklore of Canadian foods such as the butter tart.

== Publications and articles ==
- Old Bush Songs: The Centenary Edition of Banjo Paterson's Classic Collection (review) Folk Music Journal, January 1, 2007.
- English-French Macaronic Songs in Canada - A Research Note and Query. Folksongs
- Posen, I.S. and Taft M. The Newfoundland Popular Music Project. Canadian Folk Music Journal 1 (1973) pages 17–23
- Posen, I.S. and Sciorra, J. Brooklyn's Dancing Tower. Natural History 96(6) 1983 pages 30–37

Books authored

- Posen, Sheldon and Erin Gursky (2015). Terry Fox: Running to the Heart of Canada. Canadian Museum of History.
- Posen, I. Sheldon (2004). 626 By 9: A Goal-by-Goal Timeline of Maurice the Rocket Richard's Scoring Career in Pictures, Stats, and Stories. Canadian Museum of Civilization. ISBN 0-660-19255-1.
- The Canadian Pub Caroler compiled by Shelley Posen, OFC Publications, Ottawa, Ontario, Canada 2002. ISSM # m-706023-00-7
- For Singing and Dancing and All Sorts of Fun (1988) ISBN 978-0-88879-178-8. Winner of the 1991 Porcupine Book Award
- Posen, I. Sheldon; Joseph Sciorra; David M Kahn (1989). The Giglio: Brooklyn's Dancing Tower. Brooklyn, N.Y.: Brooklyn Historical Society. OCLC 22905350.
- Posen, Shelley (2009). The Christmas Canoe. Illustrated by Magdalene Carson. Renfrew, Ontario, Canada: General Store Publishing House. ISBN 978-1-897508-35-0. OCLC 440090567.
- Posen, Shelley (2020). The Maple Syrup Maker's Alphabet. Illustrated by Magdalene Carson. Ontario, Canada: Ontario Maple Syrup Producers' Association. ISBN 978-0-9948927-2-0.

== Music ==
Songs

For a listing of Shelley Posen's recorded songs to 2022, see https://shelleyposen.com/shelley-posen-song-catalogue/

- No More Fish, No Fishermen
- Having a Drink with Jane
- When First I Stepped in a Canoe
- S'mores
- Everyone Loves Shabbes But the Chickens
- The La-La-Latke Song
- So How Come You Don't Have Tongue?
- And We Sang 'Ha Lakhma Anya'
- Fork Garden
- Thanks for the Song
- Christmas Trilogy
- There's Always Money for a War
- Long, Long Tunnel 2020

Solo Albums

- Mazel 2022
- Old Loves 2022
- Ontario Moon 2019
- Roseberry Road 2014
- Menorah: Songs from a Jewish Life 2007
- The Old Songs' Home 2003
- Manna 2003

Albums as part of Finest Kind

- Lost in a Song 1996
- Heart's Delight 1999
- Silks & Spices 2004
- Feasts & Spirits 2004
- For Honour & For Gain 2010
- From Shore to Shore 2014
- I Am Christmas 2018
