= John Goss (composer) =

English organist and composer (1800–1880)

Sir John Goss
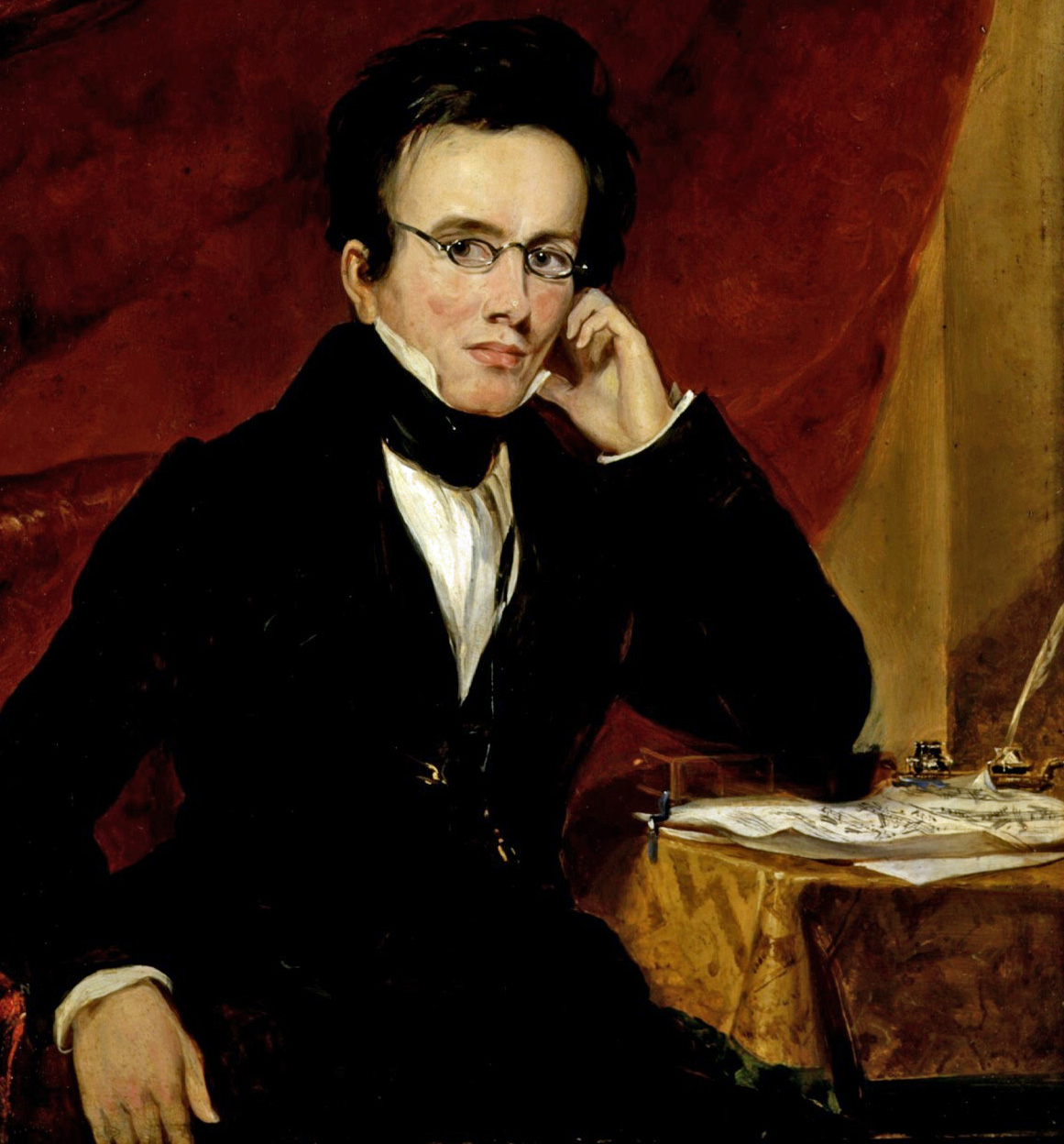
- Goss circa 1835
- Born: 27 December 1800
- Died: 10 May 1880 (aged 79); Brixton
- Occupations: Organist; Composer
- Organizations: St Luke's Church, Chelsea; St Paul's Cathedral

Sir John Goss (27 December 1800 – 10 May 1880) was an English organist, composer and teacher.

Born to a musical family, Goss was a boy chorister of the Chapel Royal, London, and later a pupil of Thomas Attwood, organist of St Paul's Cathedral. After a brief period as a chorus member in an opera company he was appointed organist of a chapel in south London, later moving to more prestigious organ posts at St Luke's Church, Chelsea and finally St Paul's Cathedral, where he struggled to improve musical standards.

As a composer, Goss wrote little for the orchestra, but was known for his vocal music, both religious and secular. Among his best-known compositions are his hymn tunes "Praise, my soul, the King of heaven" and "See, Amid the Winter's Snow". The music critic of The Times described him as the last of the line of English composers who confined themselves almost entirely to ecclesiastical music.

From 1827 to 1874, Goss was a professor at the Royal Academy of Music, teaching harmony. He also taught at St Paul's. Among his pupils at the academy were Arthur Sullivan, Frederic Cowen and Frederick Bridge. His best-known pupil at St Paul's was John Stainer, who succeeded him as organist there.

== Life and career ==
=== Early years ===
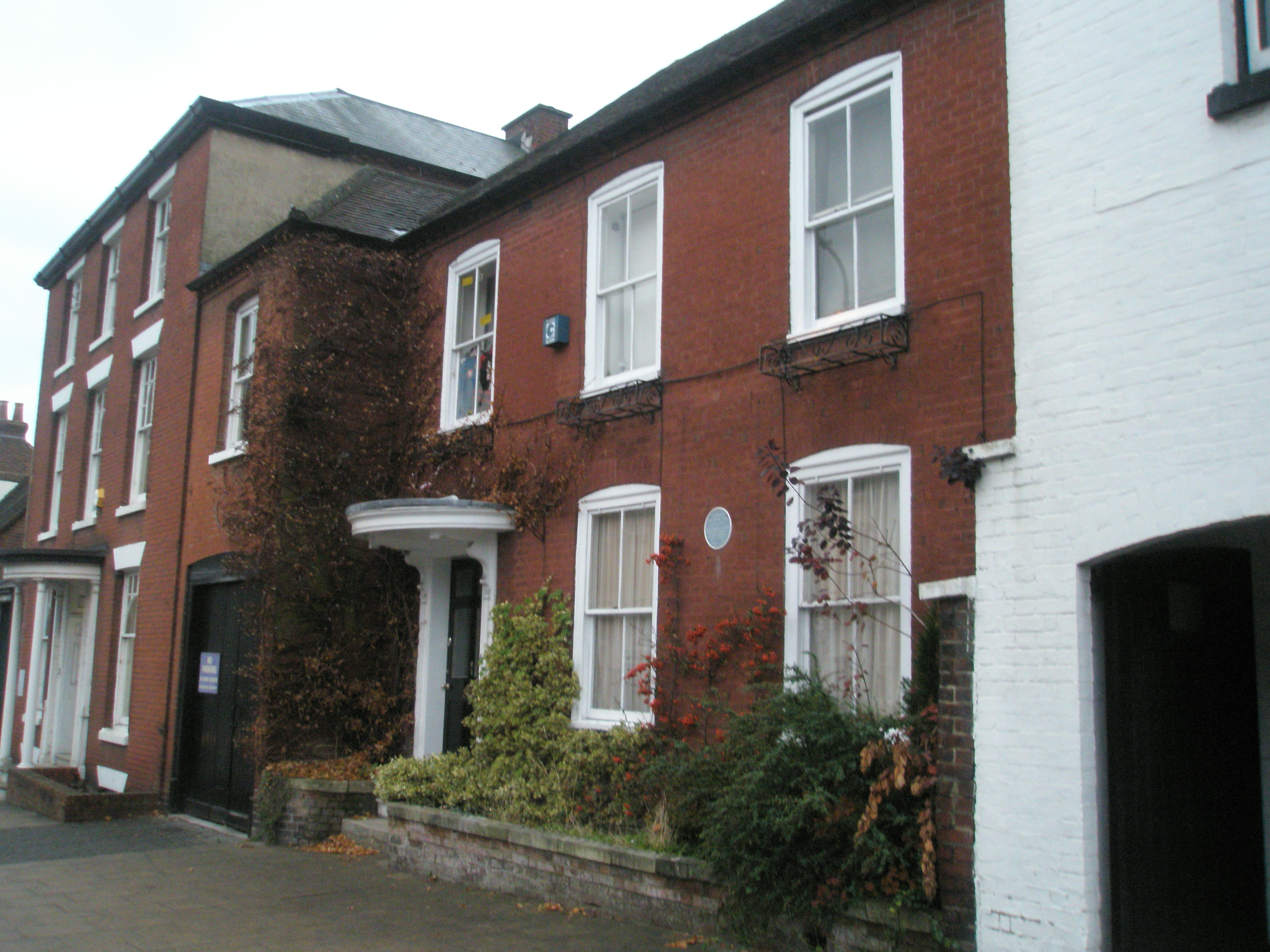
Goss's former home in Fareham

Goss came from a musical background. His father, Joseph Goss, was organist of Fareham Parish Church in Hampshire, and earlier members of the family had been celebrated singers. At the age of eight the boy was sent to a school at Ringwood. Three years later he went to London under the care of his uncle, John Jeremiah Goss, an alto singer who sang in the choirs of the Chapel Royal, St. Paul's Cathedral and Westminster Abbey. The young Goss became one of the Children of the Chapel Royal. The master of the choir at that time was John Stafford Smith, a musician known for composing the song To Anacreon in Heaven, later used as the tune of the American national anthem. As an educator, Smith combined a harsh discipline with a narrow musical curriculum. He confiscated Goss's score of Handel's organ concertos on the grounds that choristers of the Chapel Royal were there to learn to sing and not to play. Goss later recalled,

We had a "Writing Master" from half-past twelve to two on Wednesdays and Saturdays, if my memory do not deceive me, and no other instruction in reading, writing, arithmetic, and a little English grammar than we ten could get out of that time. As to playing on an instrument and learning thorough bass, what we did we did by and for ourselves!

When his voice broke in 1816, Goss left the choir and went to live with his uncle. The elder Goss was well known as a teacher, and was at the time teaching James Turle, later organist of Westminster Abbey. The young Goss, however, became a pupil of Thomas Attwood, organist of St Paul's Cathedral. Unlike the rigid and harsh Smith, Attwood, a former pupil of Mozart, was a musician of wide sympathies and kind disposition. Mendelssohn called him "dear old Mr. Attwood", and Goss became devoted to his teacher, under whom he learnt the art of composition and orchestration.

Unable, at first, to secure a post as an organist, Goss earned money by joining the chorus of an opera company. Under the direction of Henry Bishop, he took part in the first performance in England of Don Giovanni "much tinkered under Bishop's direction" at the King's Theatre in April 1817.

One of Goss's early compositions was a "Negro Song" (1819) for three voices, scored for a small orchestra (strings, flutes, oboes, clarinets, and two horns). Another was a romantic song, "Wert thou like me," to words by Walter Scott, which Goss dedicated to his fiancée, Lucy Emma Nerd (1800–1895), whom he married in 1821.

=== Organist and teacher ===
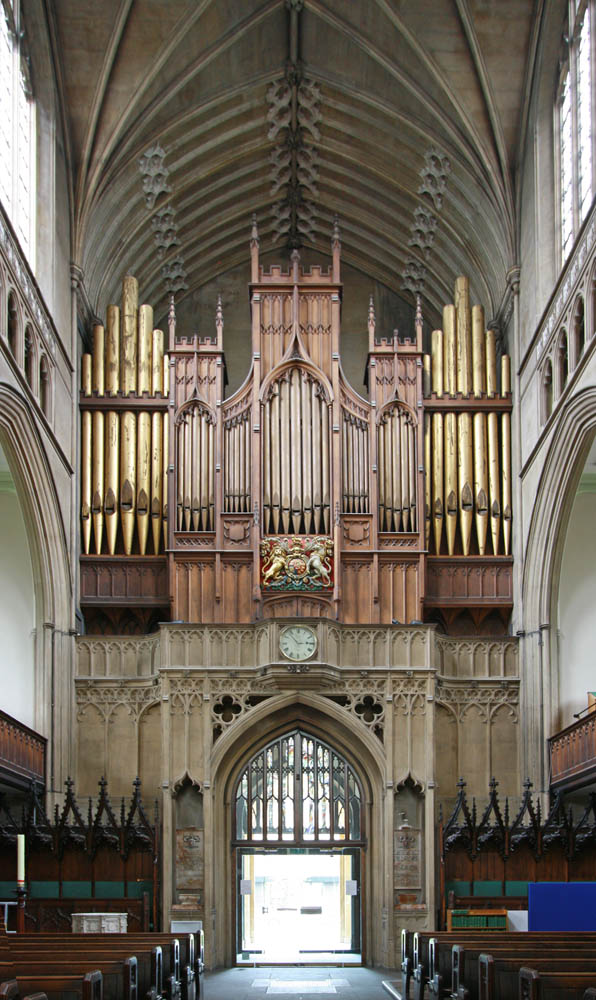
Interior of St Luke's, Chelsea

In 1821 Goss married his fiancée Lucy Emma New, and secured an appointment as an organist, at Stockwell Chapel (later known as St. Andrew's Church), in south London. He held this post for four years, before winning an open competition for the much more prestigious post of organist at St. Luke's, Chelsea, then called Chelsea New Church, in December 1824. The salary was £100 a year, equivalent to more than £80,000 in terms of 2009 incomes.

Goss composed a small amount of orchestral music in this period. Two overtures, in F minor and E flat major, written circa 1824, were performed and published in 1827, with considerable success. He composed incidental music for John Banim's melodrama The Serjeant's Wife, performed at the English Opera House on 24 July 1827. The Observer's sole comment on the composer's contribution was, "The music, which is by Mr. Goss, neither delights nor offends." Thereafter, Goss avoided orchestral composition, declining a request from the Philharmonic Society of London for another orchestral piece in 1833. As a composer, Goss became known for his vocal music. His solo songs and glees were much performed and were well reviewed in the musical press.

In 1827, while retaining his organ post at Chelsea, Goss became professor of harmony at the Royal Academy of Music, a position he held until 1874. Among his pupils during his 47-year tenure were Arthur Sullivan, Frederic Cowen, Frederick Bridge, and Stephen Kemp. His biographer Judith Blezzard describes Goss as "a distinguished and painstaking teacher, and a tasteful and virtuoso performer on the organ, creating marvellous effects on the then comparatively rudimentary instrument."

In 1833 Goss entered his anthem, "Have mercy upon me, O God," in the Gresham Prize Medal competition for the best original composition in sacred vocal music. His work won the prize, beating S. S. Wesley's, setting of "The Wilderness". Goss dedicated his anthem to his old teacher Thomas Attwood; it was performed at the Mansion House in June 1834. Goss's other main work of 1833 was his instructional book An Introduction to Harmony and Thorough-Bass, which became a standard work and went through 14 editions.

=== St Paul's Cathedral ===
Portrait of Goss inscribed to his former pupil Arthur Sullivan

Attwood died in 1838, and Goss hoped to succeed him as organist of St Paul's. He sought the advice of the Rev Sydney Smith, canon of St Paul's, who teased him by telling him that the salary was only £34 a year. Having a family to support, Goss replied that he might not be able to apply for the post, but Smith then revealed that the post of organist carried with it several additional sources of income, which enabled Goss to reconsider. He was appointed to the post, but immediately found that the organist was employed solely to play the organ, and enjoyed little influence over the other music of the cathedral. Control of the music lay with the Succentor, Canon Beckwith, who was at odds with the Almoner, Canon Hawes, who was responsible for rehearsing the boy choristers. The cathedral authorities were not interested in raising musical standards. Sydney Smith's view was typical: "It is enough if our music is decent … we are there to pray, and the singing is a very subordinate consideration." Some of Smith's colleagues were indifferent to both considerations, there being frequent absenteeism by the junior clergy, neglecting their duties and failing to conduct services.

Goss was noted for his piety and gentleness of character. His pupil, John Stainer, wrote, "That Goss was a man of religious life was patent to all who came into contact with him, but an appeal to the general effect of his sacred compositions offers public proof of the fact." His mildness was a disadvantage when attempting to deal with his recalcitrant singers. He was unable to do anything about the laziness of the tenors and basses, who had lifetime security of tenure and were uninterested in learning new music. The biographer Jeremy Dibble writes, "Hostility to [Goss's] fine anthem 'Blessed is the man', composed in 1842, undermined his confidence so markedly that he did not compose any further anthems until 1852, when he was commissioned to write two anthems for the state funeral of the Duke of Wellington. Those new anthems were "If we believe that Jesus died" and "And the King said"; the latter being written so that it moved seamlessly into Handel's Dead March in Saul, a combination which Prince Albert reported "had made everyone weep". Goss also composed for the service an Anglican chant for the Nunc dimittis, based on Beethoven's Symphony No. 7.

Stainer who was a boy chorister at the time of Wellington's funeral later recalled the effect of Goss's music at rehearsal: "When the last few bars pianissimo had died away, there was a profound silence for some time, so deeply had the hearts of all been touched by its truly devotional spirit. Then there gradually arose on all sides the warmest congratulation to the composer, it could hardly be termed applause, for it was something much more genuine and respectful." Stainer was not always so reverential about his teacher. He later recalled the occasion on which he and the young Arthur Sullivan succumbed to laughter when Goss absent-mindedly walked across the pedals of the organ during a service "before he realised that he was the cause of the alarming thunderings which were frightening the congregation and putting a temporary pause in the sermon."

=== Later years ===
In 1861, to raise funds for a new organ at St Paul's Goss set up and conducted a performance of Messiah, the first oratorio to be performed in St Paul's. In the Victorian style, the performance was on a large scale, with 600 performers.

In the early 1870s Goss's health began to fail. By 1872 he had decided to retire, and his swan-song at St Paul's was in February of that year at the national service of thanksgiving for the recovery of the Prince of Wales from a grave illness. For this service he composed a setting of the Te Deum and an anthem, "The Lord is my strength". In the following month he handed over his post at St Paul's to his former pupil Stainer.

Goss died at his home in Brixton, south London at the age of 79. His funeral service was held in St Paul's, and he was buried in Kensal Green cemetery.

=== Honours and memorials ===
Goss was knighted on his retirement, and, together with Sullivan, he received an honorary doctorate in music at the University of Cambridge in 1876.

A memorial was erected to Goss in St Paul's in 1886; beneath a bas-relief by Hamo Thornycroft is the opening of Goss's "If we believe," the anthem sung at his funeral service in the cathedral. A century after Goss's death the Fareham Society added a blue plaque to his former home.

== Works ==
Memorial to Goss in St Paul's Cathedral

In the Grove Dictionary of Music and Musicians, W. H. Husk and Bruce Carr write of Goss, "His glees enjoyed long popularity for their grateful vocal writing. As a church composer his reputation came later, through the grace and the careful word-setting of his anthems, composed mostly after 1850." They quote a contemporary as saying that Goss's music "is always melodious and beautifully written for the voices, and is remarkable for a union of solidity and grace, with a certain unaffected native charm." Judith Blezzard, in the Oxford Dictionary of National Biography, writes:

Goss was one of the most important early Victorian church composers, his anthems and services being most notable for their flexibility of phrasing, attention to detail in word-setting, and sense of proportion and balance. … In 1852 his anthem "If we believe that Jesus died", written for the funeral of the duke of Wellington, created a profound impression. In 1854 he produced the anthem "Praise the Lord, o my soul" for the bicentenary festival of the sons of the clergy. … Some of his anthems, including "The Wilderness" (1861), "O taste and see" (1863), and "O saviour of the world" (1869), have held a modest but enduring place in the repertory of English church music.

Blezzard adds that Goss is chiefly remembered for his two most famous hymn tunes: "Praise, my soul, the King of Heaven" (1869) and "See, Amid the Winter's Snow" (1871).

In the Dictionary of National Biography in 1890, J A Fuller Maitland wrote, "The best of Goss's works are distinguished by much grace and sweetness, underlying which is a solid foundation of theoretic and contrapuntal science. It is difficult to resist the assumption that at least some part of this happy combination was inherited, through Attwood, from Mozart. Goss was the last of the illustrious line of English composers who confined themselves almost entirely to ecclesiastical music." Among Goss's works, Fuller Maitland singled out for particular praise the glee "Ossian's Hymn to the Sun", and the anthems "The Wilderness," "O taste and see," and "O Saviour of the World".

=== Anthems ===
A complete list of anthems:

- Almighty and merciful God
- Almighty and everlasting God
- And the King said to all the people
- Behold! I bring you good tidings
- Blessed is the man
- Brother, thou art gone before us
- Christ is risen
- Christ our passover
- Come, and let us return unto the Lord
- Enter not into judgment
- Fear not, O land, be glad and rejoice
- Forsake me not
- The glory of the Lord
- God so loved the world
- Have mercy upon me, O God
- Hear, O Lord
- Hosanna; for unto us
- I am the resurrection and the life
- I heard a voice from heaven
- I will magnify thee, O God
- If we believe that Jesus died
- In Christ dwelleth
- Let the wicked forsake his way
- Let thy merciful ear
- Lift up thine eyes round about
- The Lord is my strength
- Lord, let me know mine end
- Man that is born of a woman
- My voice shalt thou hear
- O give thanks unto the Lord
- O Lord God, thou strength of my health
- O Lord, thou art my God
- O praise the Lord
- O praise the Lord of heaven
- O Saviour of the world
- O taste, and see, how gracious the Lord is
- Praise the Lord, O my soul
- Praise waiteth for thee
- The Queen shall rejoice
- Requiem aeternam
- The souls of the righteous / Requiem aeternam
- Stand up and bless the Lord your God
- There is none like unto the God of Jeshurun
- These are they which follow the Lamb
- Wherewithal shall a young man
- The wilderness
- Will God in very deed

=== Publications ===
- Parochial Psalmody (London, 1826)
- The Piano Forte Student's Catechism (London, 1830)
- An Introduction to Harmony and Thorough-Bass (London, 1833)
- The Monthly Sacred Minstrel (London, 1833–c.1835)
- Chants, Ancient and Modern (London, 1841)
- (with James Turle) Cathedral Services Ancient and Modern (two volumes, 1846)
- (with William Mercer) The Church Psalter and Hymnbook (London, 1855)
- The Organist's Companion (London, 1864)

Cultural offices
Preceded by Thomas Attwood	Organist and Master of the Choristers of St Paul's Cathedral; 1838–1872	Succeeded by John Stainer
