= Annie Lennox discography =

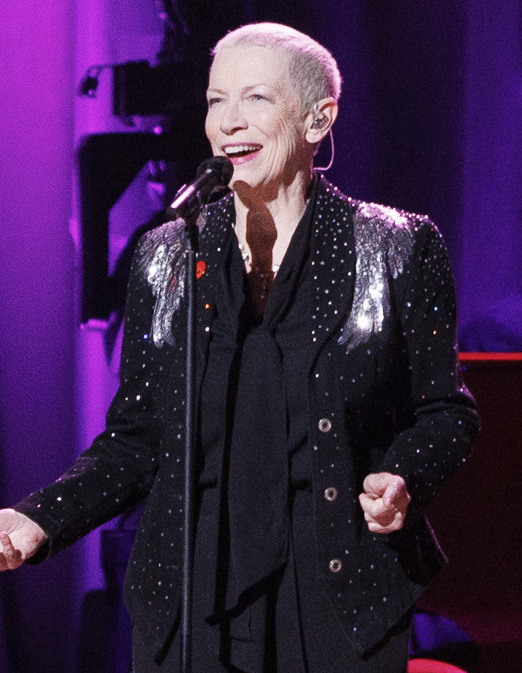
- Lennox at the Gershwin Prize for Popular Song tribute concert, Washington D.C., United States, 2024
- Studio albums: 6
- Extended plays: 1
- Compilation albums: 1
- Singles: 26
- Promotional singles: 2
- B-sides: 15
- Video albums: 4
- Music videos: 26

The discography of Scottish singer-songwriter Annie Lennox consists of 6 studio albums, 1 extended play (EP), 1 compilation album, 26 singles, 2 promotional singles, 15 B-sides, 4 video albums, and 26 music videos. After a decade of major international success as part of Eurythmics, Lennox began her solo career in earnest in 1992 with the release of her first album Diva, which produced several hit singles including "Why" and "Walking on Broken Glass". The same year, she performed "Love Song for a Vampire" for Bram Stoker's Dracula. To date, she has released six solo studio albums, three of them being covers albums (including a Christmas-themed album) and a compilation album, The Annie Lennox Collection (2009).

Following the multi-platinum success of Diva, she released her 1995 studio album, Medusa, which includes cover versions of songs such as "No More 'I Love You's'" and "A Whiter Shade of Pale". With eight Brit Awards, which includes being named Best British Female Artist a record six times, Lennox has been named the "Brits Champion of Champions". She has also collected four Grammy Awards and an MTV Video Music Award. In 2002, Lennox received a Billboard Century Award; the highest accolade from Billboard. In 2004, she received the Golden Globe and the Academy Award for Best Original Song for "Into the West", written for the soundtrack to the feature film The Lord of the Rings: The Return of the King.

In 2003, she released her third album, Bare, to critical and commercial success. Whilst it did not match the previous successes of her predecessor albums Diva and Medusa, it charted within the top ten in countries including the United Kingdom, United States, Canada, and Germany, and earned a Grammy Award nomination for Best Pop Vocal Album at the 46th Grammy Awards. Her fourth album, Songs of Mass Destruction, followed in 2007 and spawned two singles – "Dark Road" and "Sing". She fulfilled her contractual obligations with RCA Records in 2009 by releasing her first compilation album, The Annie Lennox Collection, and its lead single, a cover version of "Shining Light" which reached the top forty in the United Kingdom.

Her fifth album, and first with new record label Island and Decca, A Christmas Cornucopia was released in November 2010, and in September 2014, released her sixth solo album Nostalgia. Her version of "I Put a Spell on You" was a moderate commercial success attributed by its inclusion in the 2015 film Fifty Shades of Grey, reaching the US Billboard Hot 100, as well as the singles charts in her native Scotland, and the UK Singles Charts. Lennox has earned the distinction of 'most successful female British artist in UK music history' due to her global commercial success since the 1980s. Including her work with Eurythmics, Lennox is one of the world's best-selling music artists, having sold over 80 million records worldwide.

== Albums ==
=== Studio albums ===
List of studio albums, with selected chart positions, sales figures and certifications.
Title	Details	Peak chart positions										Sales	Certifications
Title	Details	UK	AUS	AUT	CAN	GER	ITA	NL	SWE	SWI	US	Sales	Certifications
Diva	Released: 6 April 1992; Label: RCA (#75326); Formats: CD, cassette, LP	1	7	3	8	6	1	5	5	5	23	ITA: 250,000; US: 2,700,000; WW: 7,000,000	BPI: 4× Platinum; ARIA: Platinum; BVMI: Gold; IFPI AUT: Gold; IFPI SWE: Platinum; MC: 2× Platinum; NVPI: Gold; RIAA: 2× Platinum
Medusa	Released: 6 March 1995; Label: RCA (#74321257172); Formats: CD, cassette, LP	1	5	2	1	4	5	7	4	6	11	US: 1,900,000	BPI: 2× Platinum; ARIA: Platinum; BVMI: Gold; IFPI AUT: Gold; IFPI EU: 2× Platinum; IFPI SWE: Gold; IFPI SWI: Gold; MC: 2× Platinum; RIAA: 2× Platinum
Bare	Released: 9 June 2003; Label: RCA (#82876524052); Formats: CD, digital download	3	10	17	3	5	7	18	29	7	4	US: 826,000	BPI: Gold; MC: Gold; RIAA: Gold
Songs of Mass Destruction	Released: 1 October 2007; Label: RCA (#88697152582); Formats: CD, digital download	7	41	25	9	15	3	26	26	7	9	UK: 71,000; US: 275,000	BPI: Silver
A Christmas Cornucopia	Released: 15 November 2010; Label: Island; Formats: CD, LP, digital download	16	76	35	19	37	24	60	24	38	35	US: 179,000	BPI: Gold
Nostalgia	Released: 21 October 2014; Label: Island; Formats: CD, LP, digital download	9	16	10	9	15	7	34	46	8	10	US: 139,000	BPI: Gold

=== Compilation albums ===
Title	Details	Peak chart positions										Certifications
Title	Details	UK	AUS	AUT	CAN	GER	IRE	ITA	NL	SWI	US	Certifications
The Annie Lennox Collection	Released: 17 February 2009; Label: RCA (#88697368052); Formats: CD, digital download	2	10	27	13	15	3	4	25	23	34	BPI: Platinum; FIMI: Platinum; IRE: Gold

== Extended plays ==
Title	Year	Notes
Lepidoptera	2019	Instrumental

== Singles ==
List of singles, with selected chart positions and certifications, showing year released and originating album.
Title	Year	Peak chart positions										Certifications	Album
Title	Year	UK	AUS	AUT	FRA	GER	IRE	NL	SWE	SWI	US	Certifications	Album
"Put a Little Love in Your Heart" (with Al Green)	1988	28	6	4	—	20	30	13	—	11	9		Scrooged – Soundtrack
"Why"	1992	5	17	11	—	12	5	6	10	6	34	BPI: Silver	Diva
"Precious"	1992	23	83	—	—	49	—	30	28	37	—		Diva
"Walking on Broken Glass"	1992	8	58	—	—	51	8	61	31	—	14	BPI: Platinum	Diva
"Cold"	1992	26	80	—	—	—	—	51	—	—	—		Diva
"Little Bird"	1993	3	38	—	—	29	3	—	—	34	49	BPI: Silver	Diva
"Love Song for a Vampire"	1993	3	38	—	10	—	3	—	—	34	—	BPI: Silver	Bram Stoker's Dracula – Soundtrack
"No More 'I Love You's'"	1995	2	16	11	13	27	2	23	15	14	23	BPI: Gold	Medusa
"A Whiter Shade of Pale"	1995	16	56	—	17	77	25	39	—	26	—		Medusa
"Waiting in Vain"	1995	31	117	—	—	—	—	—	—	—	—		Medusa
"Something So Right" (with Paul Simon)	1995	44	—	—	—	—	—	—	—	—	—		Medusa
"Into the West"	2003	—	—	—	—	—	—	—	—	—	—		The Lord of the Rings: The Return of the King – Soundtrack
"Wonderful"	2004	—	—	—	—	—	—	—	—	—	—		Bare
"Dark Road"	2007	58	—	—	—	—	—	—	—	45	—		Songs of Mass Destruction
"Sing"	2007	161	—	—	—	—	—	—	—	—	—		Songs of Mass Destruction
"Many Rivers to Cross"	2008	—	—	—	—	—	47	—	—	—	80		The Annie Lennox Collection
"Shining Light"	2009	39	—	—	—	—	—	97	—	—	—		The Annie Lennox Collection
"Pattern of My Life"	2009	—	—	—	—	—	—	—	—	—	—		The Annie Lennox Collection
"Full Steam" (with David Gray)	2009	—	—	—	—	—	—	—	—	—	—		Draw the Line
"Universal Child"	2010	88	—	—	—	—	—	—	—	—	—		A Christmas Cornucopia
"God Rest Ye Merry Gentlemen"	2010	—	—	—	—	—	—	—	—	—	—		A Christmas Cornucopia
"The Holly and the Ivy"	2011	—	—	—	—	—	—	—	—	—	—		A Christmas Cornucopia
"I Put a Spell on You"	2014	63	81	65	29	63	—	—	81	44	97	BPI: Silver	Nostalgia
"Summertime"	2014	—	—	—	—	—	—	—	—	—	—		Nostalgia
"Georgia on My Mind"	2014	—	—	—	—	—	—	—	—	—	—		Nostalgia
"Streets of London" (Ralph McTell featuring the Crisis Choir with Annie Lennox)	2017	92	—	—	—	—	—	—	—	—	—		Non-album single
"—" denotes a recording that did not chart or was not released in that territory.

=== Promotional singles ===
Title	Year	Album
"Pavement Cracks"	2003	Bare
"A Thousand Beautiful Things"	2004	Bare

== Other appearances ==
Title	Year	Album
"Ev'ry Time We Say Goodbye"	1990	Red Hot + Blue
"Why" (live version)	1994	The Unplugged Collection, Volume One
"Mama"	1995	Ain't Nuthin' But a She Thing
"Dream Angus"	1997	Carnival!
"Angel" (re-recording)	1997	Diana, Princess of Wales: Tribute
"Mama"	1998	The Avengers – Soundtrack
"Live with Me and Be My Love"	2002	When Love Speaks
"Love Comes" (with Jimmy Cliff)	2002	Fantastic Plastic People
"Use Well the Days"	2003	The Lord of the Rings: The Return of the King – Soundtrack
"We'll Be Together" (with Sting)	2004	Bridget Jones: The Edge of Reason – Soundtrack
"Hush, Hush, Hush" (with Herbie Hancock)	2005	Possibilities
"Fade Away" (with Yungchen Lhamo)	2006	Ama
"I Put a Spell on You"	2015	Fifty Shades of Grey – Soundtrack
"Requiem for a Private War"	2018	A Private War – Soundtrack

== Videography ==
=== Video albums ===
Title	Details
Totally Diva	Released: 6 April 1992; Label: RCA; Format: VHS, DVD
Live in Central Park	Released: 27 November 1995; Label: RCA; Format: VHS, DVD
The Annie Lennox Collection: Limited Edition	Released: 17 February 2009; Label: RCA; Format: DVD
An Evening of Nostalgia	Released: 4 May 2015; Label: Island; Format: DVD, Blu-ray

=== Music videos ===
Title	Year	Director
"Put a Little Love in Your Heart" (with Al Green)	1988	Sophie Muller
"Ev'ry Time We Say Goodbye"	1990	Ed Lachman
"Why"	1992	Sophie Muller
"Legend in My Living Room"	1992	Sophie Muller
"Precious"	1992	Sophie Muller
"Money Can't Buy It"	1992	Sophie Muller
"Cold"	1992	Sophie Muller
"Primitive"	1992	Sophie Muller
"The Gift"	1992	Sophie Muller
"Walking on Broken Glass"	1992	Sophie Muller
"Keep Young and Beautiful"	1992	Sophie Muller
"Little Bird"	1993	Sophie Muller
"Love Song for a Vampire"	1993	Sophie Muller
"No More 'I Love You's'"	1995	Annie Lennox & Joe Dyer
"A Whiter Shade of Pale"	1995	Annie Lennox & Joe Dyer
"Waiting in Vain"	1995	Annie Lennox & Joe Dyer
"Something So Right" (with Paul Simon)	1995	Annie Lennox & Joe Dyer
"Pavement Cracks"	2003	
"A Thousand Beautiful Things"	2003	
"Dark Road"	2007	Mark Langthorn & Mike Owen
"Sing"	2007	
"Shining Light"	2009	Phil Griffin
"Pattern of My Life"	2009	
"Full Steam" (with David Gray)	2009	Andy Morahan
"God Rest Ye Merry Gentlemen"	2010	Julian House & Julian Gibbs
"Dido's Lament"	2020	
