= The Annie Lennox Collection =

Greatest hits album by Annie Lennox
- Released: 17 February 2009
- Recorded: 1992–2008
- Genres: Pop rock; alternative rock; soul; R&B; synth-pop
- Length: 62:39
- Label: RCA
- Producers: Glen Ballard; Annie Lennox; Stephen Lipson; Mike Stevens; Andy Wright

Annie Lennox chronology
Songs of Mass Destruction (2007)	The Annie Lennox Collection (2009)	A Christmas Cornucopia (2010)

Singles from The Annie Lennox Collection
- 1. "Shining Light" Released: 2 March 2009; 2. "Pattern of My Life" Released: 24 May 2009

Professional ratings
Review scores
Source	Rating
AllMusic	4/5 stars
BBC Music	Positive
Blender	2.5/5 stars
Digital Spy	4/5 stars
PopMatters	9/10

The Annie Lennox Collection is the first greatest hits album by Scottish singer-songwriter Annie Lennox. It was released on 17 February 2009 and contains two brand-new songs, "Shining Light", originally a song by Ash, and a cover version of Keane's B-side "Closer Now", retitled "Pattern of My Life". The artwork was shot by Canadian rock singer Bryan Adams.

== Background ==
About the album, Lennox said, "It seems like the time has come to release the Collection this year. The songs are timeless, and have become 'classics' in their own right."

Finishing her contract with Sony BMG, Lennox released the compilation album The Annie Lennox Collection. Initially intended for release in September 2008, the release date was pushed back several months to allow her to recuperate from a back injury. It was eventually released in the United States on 17 February 2009 by Arista Records and in the United Kingdom and Europe on 9 March 2009 by RCA Records. Included on the album are songs from her four solo albums, one from the Bram Stoker's Dracula soundtrack and two new songs. One of these is a cover version of the Northern Irish band Ash's 2001 song "Shining Light", which became Lennox's first UK top forty solo hit since 1995, peaking at number 39. The other is a cover version of the English band Keane's song "Closer Now" (originally the B-side to their 2000 single "Call Me What You Like"), retitled "Pattern of My Life". The track was released digitally in the UK on 24 May 2009 as the album's second single.

A limited three-disc edition of the album was released only in the UK on the same day, containing a second CD with unreleased live cover versions of R.E.M.'s "Everybody Hurts" with Alicia Keys and Jimmy Cliff's "Many Rivers to Cross". Also on the disc is Lennox's Academy Award-winning song "Into the West" from the 2003 film The Lord of the Rings: The Return of the King. Other songs were drawn from multi-performer compilation albums including "Ev'ry Time We Say Goodbye", written by Cole Porter, originally released in 1990 on Red Hot + Blue, "Mama", written by the Sugarcubes, originally released in 1995 on Ain't Nuthin' But A She Thing, the traditional lullaby "Dream Angus" on Carnival! in 1997 and "Ladies of the Canyon" on A Tribute To Joni Mitchell, planned for release in 1999, but not released until 2007. The Paula Cole-penned "Hush, Hush, Hush" was taken from Herbie Hancock's 2005 album Possibilities The third disc is a DVD compilation containing most of Lennox's solo videos from 1992 to 2009 and two live performances.

== Commercial performance ==
The Annie Lennox Collection debuted at number two on the UK Albums Chart, Lennox's fifth top-10 solo album and fourth top-three album. It spent seven weeks in the top 10 and 25 weeks in the top 100. The album peaked at number 34 on the Billboard 200 in the US. Elsewhere, it reached the top five in Ireland, Italy, New Zealand and Norway, and the top 10 in Australia, Croatia and Denmark.

== Track listing ==
All tracks are written by Annie Lennox, except where noted.

No.	Title	Writer(s)	Original appearance	Length
1.	"Little Bird"		Diva (1992)	4:49
2.	"Walking on Broken Glass"		Diva	4:10
3.	"Why"		Diva	4:53
4.	"No More 'I Love You's'"	David Freeman; Joseph Hughes	Medusa (1995)	4:52
5.	"Precious" (Single Version)		Diva	4:15
6.	"A Whiter Shade of Pale"	Gary Brooker; Matthew Fisher; Keith Reid	Medusa	5:18
7.	"A Thousand Beautiful Things"		Bare (2003)	3:06
8.	"Sing" (Single Version)		Songs of Mass Destruction (2007)	4:20
9.	"Pavement Cracks"		Bare	5:09
10.	"Love Song for a Vampire"		Bram Stoker's Dracula: Original Motion Picture Soundtrack (1992)	4:19
11.	"Cold" (Single Version)		Diva	4:28
12.	"Dark Road"		Songs of Mass Destruction	3:47
13.	"Pattern of My Life"	Tom Chaplin; Tim Rice-Oxley; Richard Hughes; James Sanger	previously unreleased	4:18
14.	"Shining Light"	Tim Wheeler	previously unreleased	4:19

iTunes Store bonus tracks
No.	Title	Length
15.	"Walking on Broken Glass" (acoustic version)	4:40
16.	"Little Bird" (acoustic version)	3:46

Limited edition bonus disc
No.	Title	Writer(s)	Original appearance	Length
1.	"Into the West"	Lennox; Fran Walsh; Howard Shore	The Lord of the Rings: The Return of the King (2003)	5:45
2.	"Ladies of the Canyon"	Joni Mitchell	A Tribute to Joni Mitchell (2007)	3:42
3.	"Hush, Hush, Hush" (with Herbie Hancock)	Paula Cole	Possibilities (2005)	4:45
4.	"Many Rivers to Cross" (Live from Idol Gives Back)	Jimmy Cliff	previously unreleased	3:22
5.	"Dream Angus"	traditional	Carnival! (1997)	4:51
6.	"Mama"	Björk	Ain't Nuthin' But a She Thing (1995)	4:20
7.	"Everybody Hurts" (with Alicia Keys) (Live from Keep a Child Alive's Black Ball UK)	Bill Berry; Peter Buck; Mike Mills; Michael Stipe	previously unreleased	6:17
8.	"Ev'ry Time We Say Goodbye"	Cole Porter	Red Hot + Blue (1990)	3:56

Limited edition DVD
No.	Title	Length
1.	"Little Bird"
2.	"Walking on Broken Glass"
3.	"Why"
4.	"No More "I Love You's""
5.	"Precious"
6.	"A Whiter Shade of Pale"
7.	"A Thousand Beautiful Things" (Live)
8.	"Sing"
9.	"Pavement Cracks" (Live)
10.	"Cold"
11.	"Dark Road"
12.	"Pattern of My Life"
13.	"Shining Light"
14.	"Something So Right"
15.	"Waiting in Vain"

== Charts ==
=== Weekly charts ===
Weekly chart performance for The Annie Lennox Collection
Chart (2009)	Peak position
Australian Albums (ARIA)	10
Austrian Albums (Ö3 Austria)	27
Belgian Albums (Ultratop Flanders)	41
Belgian Albums (Ultratop Wallonia)	28
Canadian Albums (Billboard)	13
Croatian Albums (HDU)	7
Czech Albums (ČNS IFPI)	18
Danish Albums (Hitlisten)	6
Dutch Albums (Album Top 100)	25
European Albums (Billboard)	3
French Compilation Albums (SNEP)	21
German Albums (Offizielle Top 100)	15
Greek International Albums (IFPI)	20
Irish Albums (IRMA)	3
Italian Albums (FIMI)	4
New Zealand Albums (RMNZ)	4
Norwegian Albums (VG-lista)	4
Polish Albums (ZPAV)	21
Scottish Albums (Official Charts)	2
Swiss Albums (Schweizer Hitparade)	23
UK Albums (Official Charts)	2
US Billboard 200	34
US Top Rock Albums (Billboard)	12

=== Year-end charts ===
Year-end chart performance for The Annie Lennox Collection
Chart (2009)	Position
European Albums (Billboard)	81
Italian Albums (FIMI)	54
New Zealand Albums (RMNZ)	47
UK Albums (OCC)	49

== Certifications ==
Region	Certification	Certified units/sales
Ireland (IRMA)	Gold	7,500^{^}
Italy (FIMI)	Platinum	50,000^{*}
New Zealand (RMNZ)	Gold	7,500^{^}
United Kingdom (BPI)	Platinum	300,000^{*}
^{*} Sales figures based on certification alone.^{^} Shipments figures based on certification alone.
