= List of Billboard number-one dance singles of 2004 =

Billboard magazine compiled the top-performing dance singles in the United States during 2004 on the Hot Dance Club Play, the Hot Dance Singles Sales, and the Hot Dance Radio Airplay. Premiered in 1976, the Hot Dance Club Play chart ranked the most-played singles on dance club based on reports from a national sample of club DJs. The Hot Dance Singles Sales chart was launched in 1985 to compile the best-selling dance singles based on retail sales across the United States. The Hot Dance Radio Airplay was first published in 2003, ranking the songs based on airplay detections on dance radio.

== Charts history ==
Chart history
Issue date	Hot Dance Club Play		Hot Dance Singles Sales		Hot Dance Radio Airplay		Ref.
Issue date	Song	Artist(s)	Song	Artist(s)	Song	Artist(s)	Ref.
January 3	"Me Against the Music"	Britney Spears featuring Madonna	"Me Against the Music"	Britney Spears featuring Madonna	"Something Happened on the Way to Heaven"	Deborah Cox	
January 10	"Are You Ready for Love"	Elton John	"Me Against the Music"	Britney Spears featuring Madonna	"Something Happened on the Way to Heaven"	Deborah Cox	
January 17	"A Thousand Beautiful Things"	Annie Lennox	"Me Against the Music"	Britney Spears featuring Madonna	"Something Happened on the Way to Heaven"	Deborah Cox	
January 24	"Stoned"	Dido	"Me Against the Music"	Britney Spears featuring Madonna	"Something Happened on the Way to Heaven"	Deborah Cox	
January 31	"Wonderful"	Annie Lennox	"Me Against the Music"	Britney Spears featuring Madonna	"Gia"	Despina Vandi	
February 7	"Nothing Fails"	Madonna	"Me Against the Music"	Britney Spears featuring Madonna	"Something Happened on the Way to Heaven"	Deborah Cox	
February 14	"Fake"	Simply Red	"Me Against the Music"	Britney Spears featuring Madonna	"Hey Ya!"	OutKast	
February 21	"Give It Up"	Kevin Aviance	"Me Against the Music"	Britney Spears featuring Madonna	"Gia"	Despina Vandi	
February 28	"Slow"	Kylie Minogue	"Me Against the Music"	Britney Spears featuring Madonna	"Toxic"	Britney Spears	
March 6	"Love's Divine"	Seal	"Me Against the Music"	Britney Spears featuring Madonna	"Toxic"	Britney Spears	
March 13	"Burning"	Robbie Rivera and Axwell featuring Suzan Brittan	"Me Against the Music"	Britney Spears featuring Madonna	"As the Rush Comes"	Motorcycle	
March 20	"Face to Face"	Daft Punk	"Me Against the Music"	Britney Spears featuring Madonna	"As the Rush Comes"	Motorcycle	
March 27	"Toxic"	Britney Spears	"Me Against the Music"	Britney Spears featuring Madonna	"Toxic"	Britney Spears	
April 3	"Love Profusion"	Madonna	"Love Profusion"	Madonna	"Love Me Right (Oh Sheila)"	Angel City featuring Lara McAllen	
April 10	"Not in Love"	Enrique Iglesias featuring Kelis	"Love Profusion"	Madonna	"Love Me Right (Oh Sheila)"	Angel City featuring Lara McAllen	
April 17	"Save My Soul"	Kristine W	"Love Profusion"	Madonna	"Love Me Right (Oh Sheila)"	Angel City featuring Lara McAllen	
April 24	"Amazing"	George Michael	"Love Profusion"	Madonna	"Love Me Right (Oh Sheila)"	Angel City featuring Lara McAllen	
May 1	"Hole in the Head"	Sugababes	"Love Profusion"	Madonna	"Love Me Right (Oh Sheila)"	Angel City featuring Lara McAllen	
May 8	"Never Let Me Down"	Richard "Humpty" Vission	"Left Outside Alone" (Jason Nevins Remix)	Anastacia	† "As the Rush Comes"	Motorcycle	
May 15	"Just a Little While"	Janet	"8th World Wonder"(The Remixes)	Kimberly Locke	"Red Blooded Woman"	Kylie Minogue	
May 22	"How Did You Know"	Kurtis Mantronik presents Chamonix	"Left Outside Alone" (Jason Nevins Remix)	Anastacia	"Red Blooded Woman"	Kylie Minogue	
May 29	"Dip It Low"	Christina Milian	"Left Outside Alone" (Jason Nevins Remix)	Anastacia	"Straight Ahead"	Tube & Berger featuring Chrissie Hynde	
June 5	"Naughty Girl"	Beyoncé	"Amazing" (Full Intention & Jack 'N' Rory Mixes)	George Michael	"Deja Vu (It's Hard to Believe)"	Roc Project featuring Tina Novak	
June 12	"Strict Machine"	Goldfrapp	"Amazing" (Full Intention & Jack 'N' Rory Mixes)	George Michael	"Naughty Girl"	Beyoncé	
June 19	"I'm Ready"	Cherie	"Amazing" (Full Intention & Jack 'N' Rory Mixes)	George Michael	"Deja Vu (It's Hard to Believe)"	Roc Project featuring Tina Novak	
June 26	"Cha Cha Heels"	Rosabel with Jeanie Tracy	"Amazing" (Full Intention & Jack 'N' Rory Mixes)	George Michael	"Naughty Girl"	Beyoncé	
July 3	"One with You"	Sun	"Amazing" (Full Intention & Jack 'N' Rory Mixes)	George Michael	"Naughty Girl"	Beyoncé	
July 10	"Da Hype"	Junior Jack featuring Robert Smith	"Amazing" (Full Intention & Jack 'N' Rory Mixes)	George Michael	"Amazing"	George Michael	
July 17	"Back n da Day"	Frankie Knuckles featuring Jamie Principle	"Amazing" (Full Intention & Jack 'N' Rory Mixes)	George Michael	"Amazing"	George Michael	
July 24	"All Nite (Don't Stop)"	Janet	"Amazing" (Full Intention & Jack 'N' Rory Mixes)	George Michael	"Amazing"	George Michael	
July 31	"Let the Sun Shine"	Milk & Sugar featuring Lizzy Pattinson	"Amazing" (Full Intention & Jack 'N' Rory Mixes)	George Michael	"Amazing"	George Michael	
August 7	"Push the Feeling On"	Nightcrawlers	"Amazing" (Full Intention & Jack 'N' Rory Mixes)	George Michael	"Move Ya Body"	Nina Sky featuring Jabba	
August 14	"Stolen Car (Take Me Dancing)"	Sting	"Amazing" (Full Intention & Jack 'N' Rory Mixes)	George Michael	"Move Ya Body"	Nina Sky featuring Jabba	
August 21	"That Phone Track"	DJ Dan	"Amazing" (Full Intention & Jack 'N' Rory Mixes)	George Michael	"Move Ya Body"	Nina Sky featuring Jabba	
August 28	"I Wanna Thank Ya"	Angie Stone	"Amazing" (Full Intention & Jack 'N' Rory Mixes)	George Michael	"Turn Me On"	Kevin Lyttle featuring Spragga Benz	
September 4	"Tush"	Ghostface featuring Missy Elliott	"Amazing" (Full Intention & Jack 'N' Rory Mixes)	George Michael	"Move Ya Body"	Nina Sky featuring Jabba	
September 11	"Flawless (Go to the City)"	George Michael	"Amazing" (Full Intention & Jack 'N' Rory Mixes)	George Michael	"Turn Me On"	Kevin Lyttle	
September 18	"Time"	Murk	"Flawless (Go to the City)"	George Michael	"Turn Me On"	Kevin Lyttle	
September 25	"Foolish Mind Games"	Jason Walker	"Flawless (Go to the City)"	George Michael	"Turn Me On"	Kevin Lyttle	
October 2	"Stupidisco"	Junior Jack	"Flawless (Go to the City)"	George Michael	"Turn Me On"	Kevin Lyttle	
October 9	"One Rhythm"	Debi Nova	"Flawless (Go to the City)"	George Michael	"Turn Me On"	Kevin Lyttle	
October 16	"O.G. Bitch"	Esthero	"Turn Me On" (Remixes)	Kevin Lyttle	"Move Ya Body"	Nina Sky featuring Jabba	
October 23	"How Would U Feel"	David Morales with Lea-Lorien	"Turn Me On" (Remixes)	Kevin Lyttle	"Lola's Theme"	Shape: UK	
October 30	"Devil Inside"	Utada	"Turn Me On" (Remixes)	Kevin Lyttle	"Lola's Theme"	Shape: UK	
November 6	"Dirtyfilthy"	Superchumbo featuring Celeda	"Turn Me On" (Remixes)	Kevin Lyttle	"Lola's Theme"	Shape: UK	
November 13	"Everyman... Everywoman..."	Ono	"Turn Me On" (Remixes)	Kevin Lyttle	"Surrender"	Lasgo	
November 20	"Diary"	Alicia Keys featuring Tony! Toni! Toné!	"Turn Me On" (Remixes)	Kevin Lyttle	"Get Up Stand Up"	Stellar Project featuring Brandi Emma	
November 27	"Sand in My Shoes"	Dido	"Turn Me On" (Remixes)	Kevin Lyttle	"Surrender"	Lasgo	
December 4	"(Reach Up for The) Sunrise"	Duran Duran	"Turn Me On" (Remixes)	Kevin Lyttle	"Surrender"	Lasgo	
December 11	"Which Way You're Going"	Robbie Rivera	"Enjoy the Silence 04"	Depeche Mode	"Lose My Breath"	Destiny's Child	
December 18	"Walk into the Sun"	Dirty Vegas	"Enjoy the Silence 04"	Depeche Mode	"Lose My Breath"	Destiny's Child	
December 25	"What You Waiting For?"	Gwen Stefani	"Tempted To Touch" (Remixes)	Rupee	"Lose My Breath"	Destiny's Child	

== See also ==
- 2004 in music
- List of Billboard Hot 100 number ones of 2004
