= A Thousand Beautiful Things =

Promotional single by Annie Lennox

from the album Bare
- Released: 2004
- Studio: The Aquarium (London)
- Label: BMG; J Records
- Songwriter: Annie Lennox
- Producers: Stephen Lipson; Annie Lennox

Annie Lennox singles chronology
"Into the West" (2003)	"A Thousand Beautiful Things" (2004)	"Wonderful" (2004)

Live video
- "A Thousand Beautiful Things" on YouTube

"A Thousand Beautiful Things" is a 2004 promotional single released by Scottish singer Annie Lennox, from her third studio Bare (2003).

== Music video ==
Despite not being officially released as a single, a music video was made but remains unreleased. It can, however, be seen on YouTube.

== Track listing ==
1. "A Thousand Beautiful Things" (Blu Mar Ten Vocal)
2. "A Thousand Beautiful Things" (Blu Mar Ten Dub)
3. "A Thousand Beautiful Things" (Squint Remix)
4. "A Thousand Beautiful Things" (Chamber Remix)

Dance Vault Mixes

1. "A Thousand Beautiful Things" (Peter Rauhofer Beautiful Strings Anthem) – 10:34
2. "A Thousand Beautiful Things" (Gabriel and Dresden Techfunk Mix) – 9:10
3. "A Thousand Beautiful Things" (Bimbo Jones Stealth Mix) – 7:55
4. "A Thousand Beautiful Things" (Peter Rauhofer Short Club Mix) – 8:48
5. "A Thousand Beautiful Things" (Bimbo Jones Stealth Dub) – 5:04

== Personnel ==
- Andy Wright – producer
- Stephen Lipson – producer

== See also ==
- List of Billboard Hot Dance Club Play number ones of 2004

== Charts ==
Chart (2004)	Peak position
U.S. Hot Dance Club Play	1
