= Ben Del Maestro =

American singer

Benedict Del Maestro, also professionally known as Ben Del Maestro, is a British singer. He rose to prominence for singing the musical background score in the soundtrack for The Lord of the Rings: The Return of the King (2003).

== Career ==
The Lord of the Rings: The Return of the King also musters the biggest staged forces, with sections calling for eight trumpets and a similar increase in the rest of the brass section, two timpanists, a mixed choir of 85 with additional singers for all-male and all-female parts, over fifty in the boy choir, various vocal soloists including the American soprano Renee Fleming and Ben Del Maestro, then a boy soprano. He was also widely acknowledged for his vocal contribution to the refrain of "Inner Universe" - the title track of the critically acclaimed Japanese manga anime series Ghost in the Shell: Stand Alone Complex. He contributed vocal for the song titled Fish ~ Silent Cruise which featured in the Ghost in the Shell: Stand Alone Complex O.S.T. and also contributed vocal for the song titled Flashback Memory Plug alongside Origa which featured in the Ghost in the Shell: Stand Alone Complex O.S.T. 3.

In 2024, video footage of Ben Del Maestro performing with the London Oratory School Schola to finish post-production work for the Lord of the Rings soundtrack resurfaced on social media platforms.

== Featured discography ==
- Howard Shore – The Lord of the Rings: The Two Towers (2002) – Vocals for "Isengard Unleashed"
- Howard Shore – The Lord of the Rings: The Two Towers (2002) – Vocals for "Forth Eorlingas"
- Howard Shore – The Lord of the Rings: The Return of the King (2003) – Vocals for "Minas Tirith"
- Yoko Kanno – Ghost in the Shell: Stand Alone Complex O.S.T. (2003) – Vocals for "Inner Universe" ("Fish ~ Silent Cruise")
- Yoko Kanno – Ghost in the Shell: Stand Alone Complex O.S.T. 3 (2003) – Vocals for "Flashback Memory Plug"
