= Cameron Duncan =

New Zealand filmmaker (1986–2003)

- Born: Cameron Troy Duncan; 20 April 1986; New Zealand
- Died: 12 November 2003 (aged 17); Texas, United States
- Occupation: Filmmaker

Cameron Troy Duncan (20 April 1986 – 12 November 2003) was a New Zealand filmmaker.

== Biography ==
=== Life and film career ===
Cameron Duncan was born on 20 April 1986 of Māori descent. His parents were Rhys Duncan, a cinematographer, and Sharon Murphy. He was raised in Auckland, where he attended Avondale College. As a teenager, Duncan filmed ambitious battle scenes on home video, using household chemicals for explosions with his friends. In 1999, Duncan won his first Fair Go Secondary School Advertisement Award for a short film about traffic safety. It later became a national public awareness advertisement in New Zealand. A year later, in 2000, he won again for an anti-smoking advertisement.

In October 2001, Duncan, a student softball pitcher, felt an ache in his left knee and went to the hospital to have it checked. On 16 February 2002, Duncan was diagnosed with bone cancer, which afflicted his limbs. Against his doctor's advice, he played a final game of softball the next day before he received treatment, which confined him to a wheelchair. Duncan then filmed a four-minute short film titled DFK6498, which dealt with his cancer diagnosis and subsequent loss of freedom. In the film, Duncan drew an analogy between the limitations imposed by the disease and a prison sentence. In 2002, DFK6498 won two awards for Best Script and Best Director at the River City Short Film Festival in Whanganui, New Zealand.

While briefly in remission, Duncan was asked to direct an organ donation awareness commercial for GiveLife, a public campaign founded by fellow Aucklander Andy Tookey. The New Zealand Ministry of Health declined to sponsor the ad, claiming a lack of available funds to support the campaign. After hearing about GiveLife, film director Peter Jackson contacted Tookey and offered his support. Jackson then met Duncan and invited him on set during the filming of The Lord of the Rings: The Return of the King (2003). Before Duncan's death, the ad won the Fair Go Ad Award. By 2005, the NZ government created a new agency named Organ Donation New Zealand.

Duncan's second film Strike Zone was filmed with assistance from volunteer crew members, who were filming pick-ups for The Lord of the Rings: The Return of the King. In the film, Duncan plays a dying coach who motivates his team to win a softball game. While filming, a metastatic tumor in his lung burst, which punctured the organ. In March 2003, Duncan was told that his cancer had spread to his lungs and was inoperable. He was flown to the International BioCare Hospital in Tijuana, Mexico to receive alternative treatment for his cancer. A trust fund named in his honor raised more than NZ$20,000. Posthumously, Strike Zone won the Best Film Award at the River City Short Film Festival in New Zealand. It won the Best Secondary Film Award at the Atom Film TV and Multimedia Awards.

Duncan died on 12 November 2003 in Texas at the age of 17. A state-of-the-art headstone was unveiled at the Waikumete Cemetery years later, in 2011.

=== Relationship with Lord of the Rings ===
Towards the end of his life, Duncan befriended Peter Jackson and Fran Walsh, who had learned about his illness. On the set of The Return of the King, Duncan received blessings from Viggo Mortensen and Sir Ian McKellen, as well as a signed photo from John Rhys-Davies. He was meant to make a cameo appearance in the film. However, as Duncan's health deteriorated, it became impossible for him to do so.

Duncan's illness also helped to inspire Walsh to write the lyrics for the Oscar-winning song, "Into the West". After Duncan's death, his short films, as well as an explanatory documentary, were placed as a supplemental bonus feature on The Return of the King Extended Edition DVD.

=== Legal battle after death ===
Before his death, Duncan had donated to a sperm bank, as he had wanted to father a child and have his sperm preserved. In 2010, seven years after his death, Duncan's family tried to honor his wish and applied to the Ethics Committee on Assisted Reproductive Technology (ECART) for "the posthumous donation of sperm from the deceased to his sister's female partner". ECART granted Duncan's mother a ten-year extension to preserve his sperm; afterwards, it would be destroyed.
