= Pavement Cracks =

Promotional single by Annie Lennox

from the album Bare
- Released: 2003
- Studio: The Aquarium (London)
- Genre: Pop rock
- Length: 5:10
- Label: BMG; J Records
- Songwriter: Annie Lennox
- Producers: Stephen Lipson; Annie Lennox

Annie Lennox singles chronology
"Something So Right" (1995)	"Pavement Cracks" (2003)	"Into the West" (2003)

Audio video
- "Pavement Cracks" on YouTube

"Pavement Cracks" is a 2003 promotional single released by Scottish singer Annie Lennox, from her third solo studio album Bare (2003). Co–produced by Lennox and Stephen Lipson, it was her first solo single released in eight years following the release of "Something So Right" in 1995.

== Background ==
Like the rest of the Bare album, "Pavement Cracks" was noted for its stripped back songwriting and production style. Additionally, it was credited by Niall McMurray in Into The Popvoid as being the "best example in pop of bleakness being uplifting". Prior to the song's release, much debate arose within BMG and J Records, Lennox's record companies, about how to market the song. They realised that the chart landscape had changed significantly since Lennox last achieved a top ten single in the United Kingdom, 1995's "No More I Love You's", and the decision was made to release the song only as a promotional single rather than a full release.

== Release and performance ==
Lennox's record label decided to pursue their intention of releasing the song as a promotional only single, therefore, making it ineligible to chart on mainstream official singles charts. Despite concerns about the single's release and chart performance, it received heavy airplay on BBC Radio 2 by Ken Bruce. In the United States, it reached number one on the Billboard Hot Dance Club Play and number two on the Billboard Dance Singles Sales.

== Music video ==
A music video was made for the single; it remains unreleased but can be found on YouTube.

== Track listing ==
1. "Pavement Cracks" (Mac Quayle Extended Mix) - 6:30
2. "Pavement Cracks" (Goldtrix Club Mix) - 6:26
3. "Pavement Cracks" (The Scumfrog Club Mix) - 8:21
4. "Pavement Cracks" (Gabriel & Dresden Club Mix) - 9:56
5. "Pavement Cracks" (The Scumfrog Knob Dub) - 6:45

== Charts ==
Chart	Position
US Billboard Dance Club Songs	1
US Billboard Dance Singles Sales	2
US Billboard Hot Singles Sales	17

== Personnel ==
- Mixed By - Heff Moraes
- Producer - Stephen Lipson
- Written-By - Annie Lennox

== See also ==
- List of Billboard Hot Dance Music/Club Play number ones of 2003
