= Songs of Mass Destruction =

Studio album by Annie Lennox
- Released: 1 October 2007
- Recorded: September 2006 – February 2007
- Studio: The High Window (Hollywood); Westlake (West Hollywood)
- Genre: Pop rock; funk rock; blues rock; soul
- Length: 46:51
- Label: RCA; 19
- Producer: Glen Ballard

Annie Lennox chronology
Bare (2003)	Songs of Mass Destruction (2007)	The Annie Lennox Collection (2009)

Singles from Songs of Mass Destruction
- 1. "Dark Road" Released: 24 September 2007; 2. "Sing" Released: 1 December 2007

Professional ratings
Aggregate scores
Source	Rating
Metacritic	68/100
Review scores
Source	Rating
AllMusic	4/5 stars
The Austin Chronicle	3.5/5 stars
Entertainment Weekly	B
The Guardian	2/5 stars
Houston Chronicle	3/5 stars
Los Angeles Times	3/4 stars
People	3/4 stars
Rolling Stone	3.5/5 stars
Slant Magazine	3/5 stars
Stylus Magazine	D

Songs of Mass Destruction is the fourth solo studio album by Scottish singer Annie Lennox, released on 1 October 2007 by RCA Records and 19 Recordings. It was her first album of new material since 2003's Bare, and to date her most recent of original material.

== Singles ==
The first single, "Dark Road", originally appeared on Lennox's Myspace page on 15 August 2007. It was subsequently released as a single on 24 September 2007 and charted at number 58 on the UK Singles Chart.

The second single, "Sing", was released digitally on 1 December 2007 and it had a physical release as a single on 17 March 2008. "Sing" is a collaboration between Lennox and 23 other prominent female acts and artists and is a charity record aimed at raising money and awareness for the HIV/AIDS organization Treatment Action Campaign. The line-up consists of Madonna (who sings solo on the second verse of the song), Anastacia, Isobel Campbell, Dido, Celine Dion, Melissa Etheridge, Fergie, Beth Gibbons, Faith Hill, Angélique Kidjo, Beverley Knight, Gladys Knight, k.d. lang, Sarah McLachlan, Beth Orton, Pink, Bonnie Raitt, Shakira, Shingai Shoniwa, Joss Stone, Sugababes, KT Tunstall, and Martha Wainwright.

As Lennox reported herself on her official website, this song is about raising money and awareness for what she considers to be the HIV/AIDS genocide:

Several years ago I personally witnessed Nelson Mandela, standing in front of his former prison cell on Robben Island, addressing the world's press. His message was that the pandemic of HIV/AIDS in Africa was in fact, a genocide. Since that time I resolved to do as much as I can to bring attention to the HIV/AIDS crisis.

== Critical reception ==
Songs of Mass Destruction received generally favourable reviews from critics upon its release, holding a Metacritic's average score of 68 out of 100 based on 18 reviews.

== Tour ==
On 13 September 2007, Lennox announced a primarily North American tour for Songs of Mass Destruction called Annie Lennox Sings, which is the third solo tour of her career. Lasting throughout October and November 2007, the tour included 18 stops: London, San Diego, San Francisco, Los Angeles, Dallas, Boulder, Minneapolis, Chicago, Detroit, Toronto, Washington, D.C., Nashville, Atlanta, Miami, New York City (two dates), Philadelphia, and Boston. The venues generally were at medium-size theatres, except in New York City, where one of the dates was a United Nations fundraiser at Wall Street restaurant Cipriani.

== Commercial performance ==
Songs of Mass Destruction debuted at number seven on the UK Albums Chart with 25,000 copies sold in its first week, and has since been certified Silver by the British Phonographic Industry (BPI). It peaked at number nine on the US Billboard 200, selling 78,000 copies its first week. As of October 2010, the album had sold 275,000 copies in the United States and 71,000 copies in the United Kingdom.

== Track listing ==
All tracks are written by Annie Lennox, except "Womankind", written by Lennox and Nadirah X.

No.	Title	Length
1.	"Dark Road"	3:47
2.	"Love Is Blind"	4:18
3.	"Smithereens"	5:17
4.	"Ghosts in My Machine"	3:30
5.	"Womankind"	4:28
6.	"Through the Glass Darkly"	3:29
7.	"Lost"	3:41
8.	"Coloured Bedspread"	4:29
9.	"Sing"	4:48
10.	"Big Sky"	4:02
11.	"Fingernail Moon"	5:02

Barnes & Noble bonus tracks
No.	Title	Length
12.	"Dark Road" (Acoustic version)	3:30
13.	"Don't Take Me Down"	3:52

iTunes special edition bonus tracks
No.	Title	Length
12.	"Walking on Broken Glass" (Live)	4:30
13.	"Dark Road" (Live)	3:46

Deluxe edition enhanced CD
No.	Title	Length
1.	"Track-by-track commentaries"	46:51
2.	"Dark Road" (Music video)	3:46
3.	"Bonus materials"

Bonus track version
No.	Title	Length
1.	"Little Bird" (Live)	4:20
2.	"Walking on Broken Glass" (Live)	4:30
3.	"Smithereens" (with Audio Commentary)	5:15
4.	"Sing" (with Audio Commentary)	4:46
5.	"Dark Road" (with Audio Commentary)	3:47

== Personnel ==
Credits adapted from the liner notes of Songs of Mass Destruction.

=== Musicians ===
- Annie Lennox – all vocals, piano, keyboards
- Blair Sinta – drums
- Sean Hurley – bass
- Joel Shearer – guitar
- Randy Kerber – piano, keyboards
- Zac Rae – keyboards
- Glen Ballard – keyboards
- Mike Stevens – keyboards, arrangements
- Eddie Baytos – accordion
- Nadirah X – rap on "Womankind"
- Anastacia, Angélique Kidjo, Beth Gibbons, Beth Orton, Beverley Knight, Bonnie Raitt, Celine Dion, Dido, Faith Hill, Fergie, Gladys Knight, Isobel Campbell, Joss Stone, k.d. lang, KT Tunstall, Madonna, Martha Wainwright, Melissa Etheridge, Pink, Sarah McLachlan, Shakira, Shingai Shoniwa, Sugababes – choir on "Sing"
- The Generics – additional performance on "Sing"

=== Technical ===
- Glen Ballard – production
- Tom Lord-Alge – mixing at South Beach Studios (Miami Beach, Florida)
- Femio Hernandez – mix assistance
- Scott Campbell – recording engineering
- Mike Stevens – additional production
- Ted Jensen – mastering at Sterling Sound (New York City)

=== Artwork ===
- Mike Owen – photography
- Allan Martin – design

== Charts ==
Chart performance for Songs of Mass Destruction
Chart (2007)	Peak position
Australian Albums (ARIA)	41
Austrian Albums (Ö3 Austria)	25
Belgian Albums (Ultratop Flanders)	57
Belgian Albums (Ultratop Wallonia)	25
Canadian Albums (Billboard)	9
Czech Albums (ČNS IFPI)	14
Danish Albums (Hitlisten)	36
Dutch Albums (Album Top 100)	26
European Albums (Billboard)	9
French Albums (SNEP)	28
German Albums (Offizielle Top 100)	15
Greek Albums (IFPI)	47
Irish Albums (IRMA)	21
Italian Albums (FIMI)	3
Polish Albums (ZPAV)	21
Scottish Albums (OCC)	6
Spanish Albums (Promusicae)	94
Swedish Albums (Sverigetopplistan)	26
Swiss Albums (Schweizer Hitparade)	7
UK Albums (OCC)	7
US Billboard 200	9
US Top Alternative Albums (Billboard)	2
US Top Rock Albums (Billboard)	3

== Certifications ==
Certifications for Songs of Mass Destruction
Region	Certification	Certified units/sales
United Kingdom (BPI)	Silver	71,000
