= The Lord of the Rings: The Return of the King (soundtrack) =

2003 soundtrack album by Howard Shore

Soundtrack album by Howard Shore
- Released: 25 November 2003
- Genre: Soundtrack
- Length: 72:05
- Label: Reprise
- Producer: Howard Shore

Singles from The Lord of the Rings: The Return of the King
- 1. "Into the West" Released: November 2003

The Lord of the Rings: The Return of the King is the soundtrack for the 2003 epic fantasy adventure film of the same name. The score was composed, orchestrated, and conducted by Howard Shore, and performed by the London Philharmonic Orchestra, the London Voices, and the London Oratory School Schola. The soundtrack was released on 25 November 2003. The limited edition contains a bonus DVD with the track "Use Well the Days" by Annie Lennox, song texts, photo gallery, and a Lord of the Rings trilogy supertrailer.

== Overview ==
The score to Return of the King is the most expansive of the three soundtracks to Peter Jackson's film trilogy. It contains over four hours of finalized music, scoring virtually the entire film length. It also musters the biggest staged forces, with sections calling for eight trumpets and a similar increase in the rest of the brass section, two timpanists, a mixed choir of 85 with additional singers for all-male and all-female parts, over fifty in the boy choir, various vocal soloists including the American soprano Renee Fleming and the boy soprano Ben Del Maestro, and the full bands of celtic and eastern instruments returning from the first score. The score even uses a double fiddle, an instrument invented and crafted specifically for one scene in the film. Shore also scored the trailer for the film, which would eventually be released with various alternate takes in the Rarities archive.

== Reception ==
Professional ratings
Review scores
| Source | Rating |
|---|---|
| AllMusic | 4/5 stars |
| Filmtracks | 5/5 stars |
| Movie Music UK | 5/5 stars |
| Soundtrack.Net | 5/5 stars |
| Tracksounds | 10/10 stars |

The Return of the King won the Academy Awards for Best Original Score and Best Original Song ("Into the West" by Annie Lennox), the Golden Globe Award for Best Original Score, and the Grammy Award for Best Score Soundtrack Album.

== Track listing ==
All music is composed by Howard Shore.

| No. | Title | Length |
|---|---|---|
| 1. | "A Storm Is Coming" | 2:52 |
| 2. | "Hope and Memory" | 1:45 |
| 3. | "Minas Tirith" (featuring Ben Del Maestro) | 3:37 |
| 4. | "The White Tree" | 3:25 |
| 5. | "The Steward of Gondor" (featuring Billy Boyd) | 3:53 |
| 6. | "Minas Morgul" | 1:58 |
| 7. | "The Ride of the Rohirrim" | 2:08 |
| 8. | "Twilight and Shadow" (featuring Renée Fleming) | 3:30 |
| 9. | "Cirith Ungol" | 1:44 |
| 10. | "Andúril" | 2:35 |
| 11. | "Shelob's Lair" | 4:07 |
| 12. | "Ash and Smoke" | 3:25 |
| 13. | "The Fields of the Pelennor" | 3:26 |
| 14. | "Hope Fails" | 2:20 |
| 15. | "The Black Gate Opens" (featuring Sir James Galway) | 4:01 |
| 16. | "The End of All Things" (featuring Renée Fleming) | 5:12 |
| 17. | "The Return of the King" (featuring Sir James Galway, Viggo Mortensen, and Renée Fleming) | 10:14 |
| 18. | "The Grey Havens" (featuring Sir James Galway) | 5:59 |
| 19. | "Into the West" (words and music by Fran Walsh, Howard Shore and Annie Lennox; performed by Annie Lennox) | 5:47 |
| Total length: | | 72:05 |

Limited edition bonus DVD
| No. | Title | Length |
|---|---|---|
| 1. | "Use Well the Days" (performed by Annie Lennox) | 3:10 |

== Charts and certifications ==
=== Weekly charts ===
| Chart (2003–04) | Peak position |
|---|---|
| Australian Albums (ARIA) | 33 |
| Austrian Albums (Ö3 Austria) | 5 |
| Belgian Albums (Ultratop Flanders) | 10 |
| Belgian Albums (Ultratop Wallonia) | 32 |
| Canadian Albums (Billboard) | 31 |
| Finnish Albums (Suomen virallinen lista) | 5 |
| French Albums (SNEP) | 36 |
| German Albums (Offizielle Top 100) | 10 |
| Hungarian Albums (Mahasz) | 8 |
| Irish Albums (IRMA) | 58 |
| Irish Classical Albums (IRMA) | 1 |
| Dutch Albums (Album Top 100) | 19 |
| New Zealand Albums (RMNZ) | 9 |
| Norwegian Albums (VG-lista) | 31 |
| Swedish Albums (Sverigetopplistan) | 16 |
| Swiss Albums (Schweizer Hitparade) | 8 |
| UK Albums (Official Charts) | 34 |
| US Billboard 200 | 36 |
| US Soundtrack Albums (Billboard) | 2 |

=== Year-end charts ===
| Chart (2004) | Position |
|---|---|
| Austrian Albums (Ö3 Austria) | 74 |
| German Albums (Offizielle Top 100) | 74 |
| Swiss Albums (Schweizer Hitparade) | 99 |
| US Billboard 200 | 136 |
| US Soundtrack Albums (Billboard) | 5 |

=== Certifications ===
| Region | Certification | Certified units/sales |
|---|---|---|
| United Kingdom (BPI) | Gold | 100,000^{^} |
| United States (RIAA) | Gold | 500,000^{^} |
^{^} Shipments figures based on certification alone.

== Complete recordings and additional music ==
In 2007, Reprise Records released a multi-disc set for the film, titled The Complete Recordings. These contain the entire score for the extended versions of the film on CD, along with an additional DVD-Audio disc that offers 2.0 stereo and 5.1 surround mixes of the soundtrack. The album also featured extensive liner notes by music journalist Doug Adams which reviews all of the tracks and provides information about the process of composing and recording the score, as well as a detailed list of all musical instruments, people and organizations involved. The cover artwork uses the film series' logo and an inscription in Tolkien's tengwar letters, over a background that depicts a map of Gondor in dark green.

Disc one
| No. | Title | Length |
|---|---|---|
| 1. | "Roots and Beginnings" | 6:31 |
| 2. | "Journey to the Cross-roads" | 2:17 |
| 3. | "The Road to Isengard" | 2:18 |
| 4. | "The Foot of Orthanc" | 4:45 |
| 5. | "Return to Edoras" | 1:51 |
| 6. | "The Chalice Passed" | 1:51 |
| 7. | "The Green Dragon" (feat. Billy Boyd and Dominic Monaghan) | 0:35 |
| 8. | "Gollum's Villainy" | 2:10 |
| 9. | "Éowyn's Dream" | 1:24 |
| 10. | "The Palantír" | 3:10 |
| 11. | "Flight from Edoras" | 2:19 |
| 12. | "The Grace of Undómiel" (feat. Renée Fleming) | 6:21 |
| 13. | "The Eyes of the White Tower" | 4:33 |
| 14. | "A Coronal of Silver and Gold" | 8:27 |
| 15. | "The Lighting of the Beacons" | 9:03 |
| Total length: | | 57:32 |

Disc two
| No. | Title | Length |
|---|---|---|
| 1. | "Osgiliath Invaded" (feat. Ben Del Maestro) | 8:48 |
| 2. | "The Stairs of Cirith Ungol" | 2:41 |
| 3. | "Allegiance to Denethor" | 3:20 |
| 4. | "The Sacrifice of Faramir" (feat. "The Edge of Night", performed by Billy Boyd) | 4:09 |
| 5. | "The Parting of Sam and Frodo" | 4:04 |
| 6. | "Marshalling at Dunharrow" | 4:57 |
| 7. | "Andúril - Flame of the West" | 3:28 |
| 8. | "The Passing of the Grey Company" | 4:12 |
| 9. | "Dwimorberg - The Haunted Mountain" | 2:26 |
| 10. | "Master Meriadoc, Swordthain" | 1:40 |
| 11. | "The Paths of the Dead" | 6:22 |
| 12. | "The Siege of Gondor" | 9:01 |
| 13. | "Shelob's Lair" | 8:53 |
| 14. | "Merry's Simple Courage" | 2:09 |
| Total length: | | 66:03 |

Disc three
| No. | Title | Length |
|---|---|---|
| 1. | "Grond - The Hammer of the Underworld" | 1:33 |
| 2. | "Shelob the Great" | 5:13 |
| 3. | "The Tomb of the Stewards" | 3:58 |
| 4. | "The Battle of the Pelennor Fields" | 4:10 |
| 5. | "The Pyre of Denethor" | 2:59 |
| 6. | "The Mûmakil" | 0:57 |
| 7. | "Dernhelm in Battle" | 2:06 |
| 8. | "A Far Green Country" | 1:28 |
| 9. | "Shieldmaiden of Rohan" | 5:07 |
| 10. | "The Passing of Théoden" | 2:16 |
| 11. | "The Houses of Healing" (feat. Liv Tyler) | 2:58 |
| 12. | "The Tower of Cirith Ungol" | 4:41 |
| 13. | "The Last Debate" (feat. "Asëa Aranion", performed by Sissel) | 4:21 |
| 14. | "The Land of Shadow" | 6:29 |
| 15. | "The Mouth of Sauron" (feat. Sir James Galway) | 8:16 |
| 16. | ""For Frodo"" (feat. Ben Del Maestro) | 3:17 |
| Total length: | | 59:44 |

Disc four
| No. | Title | Length |
|---|---|---|
| 1. | "Mount Doom" (feat. Renée Fleming) | 4:09 |
| 2. | "The Crack of Doom" | 4:02 |
| 3. | "The Eagles" (feat. Renée Fleming) | 2:24 |
| 4. | "The Fellowship Reunited" (feat. Sir James Galway, Viggo Mortensen, and Renée Fleming) | 12:18 |
| 5. | "The Journey to the Grey Havens" (feat. Sir James Galway) | 7:35 |
| 6. | "Elanor" (feat. Sir James Galway) | 1:28 |
| 7. | "Days of the Ring" (feat. "Into the West", performed by Annie Lennox) | 11:10 |
| 8. | "Bilbo's Song" | 2:58 |
| Total length: | | 45:58 |

=== Additional music ===
Additional music for the film was featured in The Rarities Archive release, attached to Doug Adams' book on the three film scores:

Track listing
| No. | Title | Length |
|---|---|---|
| 1. | "The Return of the King Trailer" | 2:34 |
| 2. | "The Gondor Theme (Mock-up)" | 2:18 |
| 3. | "The Muster of Rohan (Alternate)" | 6:43 |
| 4. | "The Siege of Gondor (Alternate)" | 3:13 |
| 5. | "Shieldmaiden of Rohan (Theatrical Version)" | 2:00 |
| 6. | "Sammath Naur (Alternate)" | 8:51 |
| 7. | "Frodo's Song ("Into the West" Alternate/Mock-up)" | 2:23 |
| 8. | "Elanor (Alternate)" | 1:30 |
| 9. | "In Conversation (Audio Interview Part 1) featuring Frodo's Song (Alternate)" | 1:40 |
| Total length: | | 31:12 |

Along with about 17 minutes of alternate material from the original release, about a minute of material in the fan credits, and some additional alternates, there are over four and a half hours of finalized music for Return of the King, including the music for the trailer.
