= Pattern of My Life =

2009 single by Annie Lennox

Single by Annie Lennox

from the album The Annie Lennox Collection
- Released: 24 May 2009
- Recorded: 2008
- Genre: Pop
- Length: 4:18 (album version); 3:56 (radio edit)
- Label: RCA
- Songwriters: Tom Chaplin; Tim Rice-Oxley; Richard Hughes; James Sanger

Annie Lennox singles chronology
"Shining Light" (2009)	"Pattern of My Life" (2009)	"Full Steam" (2009)

Music video
- "Pattern of My Life" on YouTube

"Pattern of My Life" is a 2009 song performed by Annie Lennox. It is a cover version of "Closer Now" by Keane, which was a B-side to their debut single "Call Me What You Like". Lennox retitled the song, referring to a lyric in the song. It was one of two new tracks Lennox recorded for her 2009 greatest hits album The Annie Lennox Collection, and was released as a digital single on 24 May 2009 in the United Kingdom.

== Music video ==
A music video for "Pattern of My Life" was added to YouTube through Lennox's official channel on 19 February 2009 and was included on the DVD disc of The Annie Lennox Collection.

== Chart performance ==
The song failed to make impact on any charts worldwide, as it was only available as a digital download.

== Track listing ==
1. "Pattern of My Life" (radio edit) – 3:56
