= Bare (Annie Lennox album) =

2003 album by Annie Lennox

Studio album by Annie Lennox
- Released: 5 June 2003
- Studio: The Aquarium (London)
- Genres: Pop; synth-pop; soul
- Length: 49:23
- Labels: 19; RCA
- Producers: Stephen Lipson; Andy Wright; Annie Lennox

Annie Lennox chronology
Medusa (1995)	Bare (2003)	Songs of Mass Destruction (2007)

Singles from Bare
- 1. "Wonderful" Released: June 2004

Professional ratings
Aggregate scores
Source	Rating
Metacritic	68/100
Review scores
Source	Rating
About.com	4.5/5 stars
AllMusic	4.5/5 stars
Entertainment Weekly	B−
The Guardian	3/5 stars
Houston Chronicle	A−
Los Angeles Times	3.5/4 stars
The New York Times	Positive
PopMatters	Positive
Rolling Stone	3/5 stars
Slant Magazine	3.5/5 stars

Bare is the third solo studio album by Scottish singer Annie Lennox, released in Europe on 5 June 2003 by 19 Recordings and RCA Records and in North America on 10 June 2003 by J Records. It peaked at number three on the UK Albums Chart and number four on the US Billboard 200. The album has been certified Gold in both the UK and the US and was nominated for Best Pop Vocal Album at the 46th Grammy Awards.

The album was released with a DVD which included interviews and acoustic versions of songs by Lennox. The Japanese edition of the album features a version of Lennox's 1992 single "Cold" recorded live in Toronto.

Bare is scheduled to be rereleased as a limited-edition LP pressed on white vinyl on 13 November 2026.

== Artwork ==
The album cover is reminiscent of the Eurythmics 1983 album, Touch. The inspiration for the front cover is further described in a note from Lennox present on the back cover; it reads: "This is just by means of a small description to illustrate my thoughts and feelings about the particular image I've chosen for the album cover. This album contains songs that are deeply personal and emotional. In a sense I have 'exposed myself' through the work to reveal aspects of an inner world which are fragile...broken through experience, but not entirely smashed. I am not a young artist in their early twenties. I am a mature woman facing up to the failed expectations of life and facing up to 'core; issues. I don't want to represent myself visually in some kind of cliched, airbrushed, saccharine kind of way. I want to reveal myself as I am. For me this is a powerful and courageous statement. I have never been known to 'toe the safety line', in terms of how I represent myself. As an artist I need to be authentic...to take risks...to break the mould when necessary. The 'posture' of the image refers back to earlier days of Eurythmics with the Touch cover, only this time I have now turned to face the audience eye to eye, as it were. I am as 'Bare' as the title suggests, though not entirely exposed. The image is timeless, genderfree, and racially ambiguous. I could be a statue, a ghostly apparition, or an Indian saddhu. The false lashes represent the artifice of 'performance'. The colour has been drained from my mouth (where the words and sounds issue from) to saturate the title with redness. (signifying lifeforce and anger). I hope it makes sense to you. Love Annie."

== Singles ==
No singles were released from the album in the United Kingdom, though "Pavement Cracks" and "Wonderful" were released as a CD maxi single and a limited CD single respectively in the United States, while "A Thousand Beautiful Things" was released as a radio-only single. No music videos were released for the songs, although one was recorded for "Pavement Cracks", but all three singles were remixed extensively and all reached number one on the US Hot Dance Club Play chart. However, the live versions of "A Thousand Beautiful Things" and "Pavement Cracks" were made as music videos instead and the videos were later included on The Annie Lennox Collection DVD.

== Track listing ==
All tracks are written by Annie Lennox. All tracks are produced by Stephen Lipson, except "A Thousand Beautiful Things", produced by Andy Wright, Lennox and Lipson.

No.	Title	Length
1.	"A Thousand Beautiful Things"	3:06
2.	"Pavement Cracks"	5:09
3.	"The Hurting Time"	7:32
4.	"Honestly"	5:01
5.	"Wonderful"	4:17
6.	"Bitter Pill"	4:01
7.	"Loneliness"	4:01
8.	"The Saddest Song I've Got"	4:07
9.	"Erased"	4:40
10.	"Twisted"	4:10
11.	"Oh God (Prayer)"	2:49

Japanese edition bonus track
No.	Title	Length
12.	"Cold" (recorded live in Toronto)	5:32

== Personnel ==
Credits adapted from the liner notes of Bare.

=== Musicians ===
- Annie Lennox – vocals, keyboards
- Stephen Lipson – keyboards, guitars, programming
- Peter-John Vettese – keyboards, drums (unspecified tracks); keyboard solo (track 3)
- Steve Sidelnyk – additional rhythm programming
- David Rainger – additional guitars
- Tim Cansfield – additional guitars
- David Sinclair Whitaker – orchestral arrangement (track 1)
- Pro Arte Orchestra – orchestra (track 1)
- Gavyn Wright – orchestra leader (track 1)

=== Technical ===
- Stephen Lipson – production
- Andy Wright – production (track 1)
- Annie Lennox – production (track 1)
- Heff Moraes – engineering, mixing
- Tony Cousins – mastering at Metropolis Mastering (London)

=== Artwork ===
- Annie Lennox – photographs
- Allan Martin – photographs, design

== Charts ==
=== Weekly charts ===
Weekly chart performance for Bare
Chart (2003)	Peak position
Australian Albums (ARIA)	10
Austrian Albums (Ö3 Austria)	17
Belgian Albums (Ultratop Flanders)	20
Belgian Albums (Ultratop Wallonia)	15
Canadian Albums (Billboard)	3
Czech Albums (ČNS IFPI)	25
Danish Albums (Hitlisten)	13
Dutch Albums (Album Top 100)	18
European Albums (Music & Media)	5
French Albums (SNEP)	34
German Albums (Offizielle Top 100)	5
Irish Albums (IRMA)	23
Italian Albums (FIMI)	7
Japanese Albums (Oricon)	117
New Zealand Albums (RMNZ)	20
Norwegian Albums (VG-lista)	16
Polish Albums (ZPAV)	9
Scottish Albums (Official Charts)	3
Spanish Albums (AFYVE)	44
Swedish Albums (Sverigetopplistan)	29
Swiss Albums (Schweizer Hitparade)	7
UK Albums (Official Charts)	3
US Billboard 200	4

=== Year-end charts ===
Year-end chart performance for Bare
Chart (2003)	Position
German Albums (Offizielle Top 100)	70
Swiss Albums (Schweizer Hitparade)	91
UK Albums (OCC)	94
US Billboard 200	103

== Certifications ==
Certifications for Bare
Region	Certification	Certified units/sales
Canada (Music Canada)	Gold	50,000^{^}
United Kingdom (BPI)	Gold	100,000^{^}
United States (RIAA)	Gold	826,000
^{^} Shipments figures based on certification alone.
