= Wonderful (Annie Lennox song) =

Single by Annie Lennox

from the album Bare
- Released: 2004
- Studio: The Aquarium (London)
- Genre: Pop, Soul
- Length: 4:16
- Label: J
- Songwriter: Annie Lennox

Annie Lennox singles chronology
"Into the West" (2003)	"Wonderful" (2004)	"Dark Road" (2007)

Live video
- "Wonderful" on YouTube

"Wonderful" is a song by Annie Lennox, released as the third and last single from her album Bare in 2004. It was released as a CD single and 12 inch single in the United States and only as a promotional single elsewhere. The single topped the Billboard Hot Dance Club Play chart for a week and became her fifth number one on that chart. No music video was made for this song.

== Critical reception ==
The song had mixed critical reception. Thom Jurek of AllMusic made the song a "Track Pick" off Bare, called it "one of Lennox's trademark ballads", and praised the song's lyrics and its "Hall & Oates-styled Philly soul refrain". Meanwhile, Rolling Stone's Anthony Decurtis wrote that "the thumping funk chorus of 'Wonderful,' for example, sounds forced" and called it a "misstep".

== Remake ==
The song was covered by American singer Lovari on his album Moment of Love. A music video was released to accompany the track.

== Track listing ==
=== UK CD single ===
1. "Wonderful" (album version) – 4:16
2. "Pavement Cracks" (Goldtrix Full Vocal Mix) – 6:34
3. "A Thousand Beautiful Things" (Gabriel & Dresden Tech Funk Mix) – 9:03

== Chart performance ==
=== Weekly charts ===
Weekly chart performance for "Wonderful"
Chart (2003–2004)	Peak position
CIS Airplay (TopHit)	124
Russia Airplay (TopHit)	94
US Dance Club Songs (Billboard)	1

=== Year-end charts ===
Year-end chart performance for "Wonderful"
Chart (2003)	Position
CIS (TopHit)	174
Russia Airplay (TopHit)	141

== See also ==
- List of Billboard Hot Dance Club Play number ones of 2004
