= Dark Road (song) =

Single by Annie Lennox

from the album Songs of Mass Destruction
- Released: 24 September 2007
- Recorded: 2007
- Studio: The High Window (Hollywood, California); Westlake Recording Studios (North Hollywood, California)
- Genre: Pop rock; soft rock
- Length: 3:47
- Label: Sony BMG
- Songwriter: Annie Lennox
- Producer: Glen Ballard

Annie Lennox singles chronology
"Wonderful" (2004)	"Dark Road" (2007)	"Sing" (2007)

Music video
- "Dark Road" on YouTube

"Dark Road" is a song by Annie Lennox, released on 24 September 2007, as the first single from her fourth solo album Songs of Mass Destruction.

UK television network Channel 4 aired the world television premiere of the music video exclusively on 22 August 2007. After the much-maligned Virgin Media Music Awards. It delayed a new episode of Will & Grace, leading her to become the nemesis of many. It was also the first video to be premiered on Amazon.com, initially being available for 48 hours only.

The track was released as a CD single and also as a DVD single. It charted at No. 58 on the UK Singles Chart.

The song was used in the end of "Lucky Thirteen", the fifth episode of the fifth season of House.

== Track listing ==
1. "Dark Road" (album version) – 3:47
2. "Dark Road" (acoustic version) – 3:30

== Personnel ==
- Annie Lennox – vocals, composer
- Allan Martin – artwork
- Mark Langthorn – photography
- Mike Owen – photography

== Charts ==
Chart	Peak position
Italian Digital Singles	10
Swiss Singles Chart	45
UK Singles Chart	58
