= Into the West (song) =

2003 Annie Lennox song

Single by Annie Lennox

from the album The Lord of the Rings: The Return of the King (soundtrack)
- Released: November 2003
- Recorded: New Zealand
- Genre: Pop, New age
- Length: 4:35
- Label: Reprise
- Songwriters: Annie Lennox, Fran Walsh, Howard Shore
- Producer: Howard Shore

Annie Lennox singles chronology
"Something So Right" (1995)	"Into the West" (2003)	"Wonderful" (2004)

Audio video
- "Into the West" on YouTube

"Into the West" is a song performed by Scottish singer Annie Lennox, and the closing credits song of the 2003 film The Lord of the Rings: The Return of the King. It was written by Lennox, Return of the King producer and co-writer Fran Walsh, and composed and co-written by the film's composer Howard Shore.

== Background and release ==
The song plays in full during the closing credits of Return of the King, although instrumental music from the song (which forms the theme of the Grey Havens) plays at other points during the film itself. “Into the West" was acclaimed by music critics and won the Academy Award for Best Original Song, the Golden Globe Award for Best Original Song, and the Grammy Award for Best Song Written for Visual Media.

The song was later covered by New Zealand singers Yulia Townsend and Will Martin and American singer Peter Hollens. In 2014, German a cappella metal band van Canto performed a cover on their fifth studio album, Dawn of the Brave.

== Lyrics and composition ==
The original song conceived as the closing credits of the 2003 film The Lord of the Rings: The Return of the King was "Frodo's Song" (which exists only in mock-up form), which became "Use Well the Days," written by Howard Shore. In the fiction, the song was Frodo singing to Sam as he left Middle Earth and includes Frodo's lament in the middle of book 6 chapter 9 “The Grey Havens." Director Peter Jackson felt that the song wasn't a good fit as a concluding song for the series, so Shore began to try to write a different closing credits song. As he did, Cameron Duncan, a young Māori New Zealand filmmaker whose work had impressed Jackson and his team, was dying from cancer at 16 years old, and his imminent passing inspired the film's composer Howard Shore, the producer and co-writer Fran Walsh, and the Scottish singer Annie Lennox to write "Into the West". The first public performance of the song was at Duncan's funeral.

The melody of the song, "The Grey Havens", is one of the musical themes in Shore's music for the film, representing the Grey Havens on the western shore of Middle-earth. The theme is introduced during the siege of Minas Tirith, as the wizard Gandalf comforts the frightened hobbit Pippin Took by speaking of the world beyond death. The theme reappears at the end of the film in the final scene, "A Far Green Country". It begins with what the musicologist Doug Adams calls "trickling guitar", preparing for Lennox's vocals. She sings 13 verses, mostly of four lines, including "Across the sea / A pale moon rises / The ships have come / To carry you home". The song is punctuated only with six question marks, including the repeated "Why do the white gulls call?" The song ends with "And all will turn to silver glass / A light on the water / Grey ships pass / Into the West".

== Analysis ==
The scholar of music Estelle R. Jorgensen writes that the song has "a folk-like and rustic quality associated with the hobbits", helping to unify the music throughout the trilogy all the way to the film credits, and reinforcing the unity created by the films' "simple home spun folk-like leitmotifs" for the hobbits.

The ethnomusicologist William Cheng writes that Into the West is one of the songs most commonly downloaded by The Lord of the Rings Online players. He notes that on one occasion, it was used "in real life" for a memorial event for a LOTRO player. He commented that they had "imported into the gameworld their own encultured notions of ... respectful commemorative music without dwelling extensively on its degree of authenticity within ... Middle-earth."

The scholar of media and humanities Daniel White writes that the piece was the second most popular choice of Shore's compositions among survey participants to "best express Middle-earth", getting 6 mentions out of 183 replies to the optional question, after the "Concerning Hobbits" leitmotif (30 mentions) in The Fellowship of the Ring; a quarter of respondents chose music by other composers.

== Versions ==
The song has multiple versions, in addition to the one used in Return of the King (with the orchestral ending). Promos were made available in late November 2003. The versions, with their playing times, are:

- the album version – 4:35
- the radio edit – 3:59
- the acoustic edit – 4:05
- the acoustic version – 4:39
- the version without the orchestral ending – 4:34
- the film version with the orchestral ending – 5:48

== Awards and accolades ==
The song won the Academy Award for Best Original Song at the 76th Academy Awards, one of Return of the King's eleven wins. Lennox also performed the song live at the ceremony. Lennox's performance was one of several introduced by Liv Tyler, who appeared as Arwen in the film.

Award	Category	Result
Academy Awards	Best Original Song	Won
Gold Derby Film Awards	Best Original Song	Nominated
Golden Globe Awards	Best Original Song	Won
Grammy Awards	Best Song Written for a Motion Picture, Television or Other Visual Media	Won
Online Film & Television Association Awards	Best Original Song	Won
Phoenix Film Critics Society Awards	Best Original Song	Nominated
World Soundtrack Awards	Best Original Song Written Directly for a Film	Nominated

== Personnel ==
- Annie Lennox – vocals
- John Parricelli – guitar
- Dermot Crehan – hardingfele, fiddle, violin
- Ulrich Herkenhoff – flute
