= Annie Lennox =

Scottish musician (born 1954)

Annie Lennox OBE
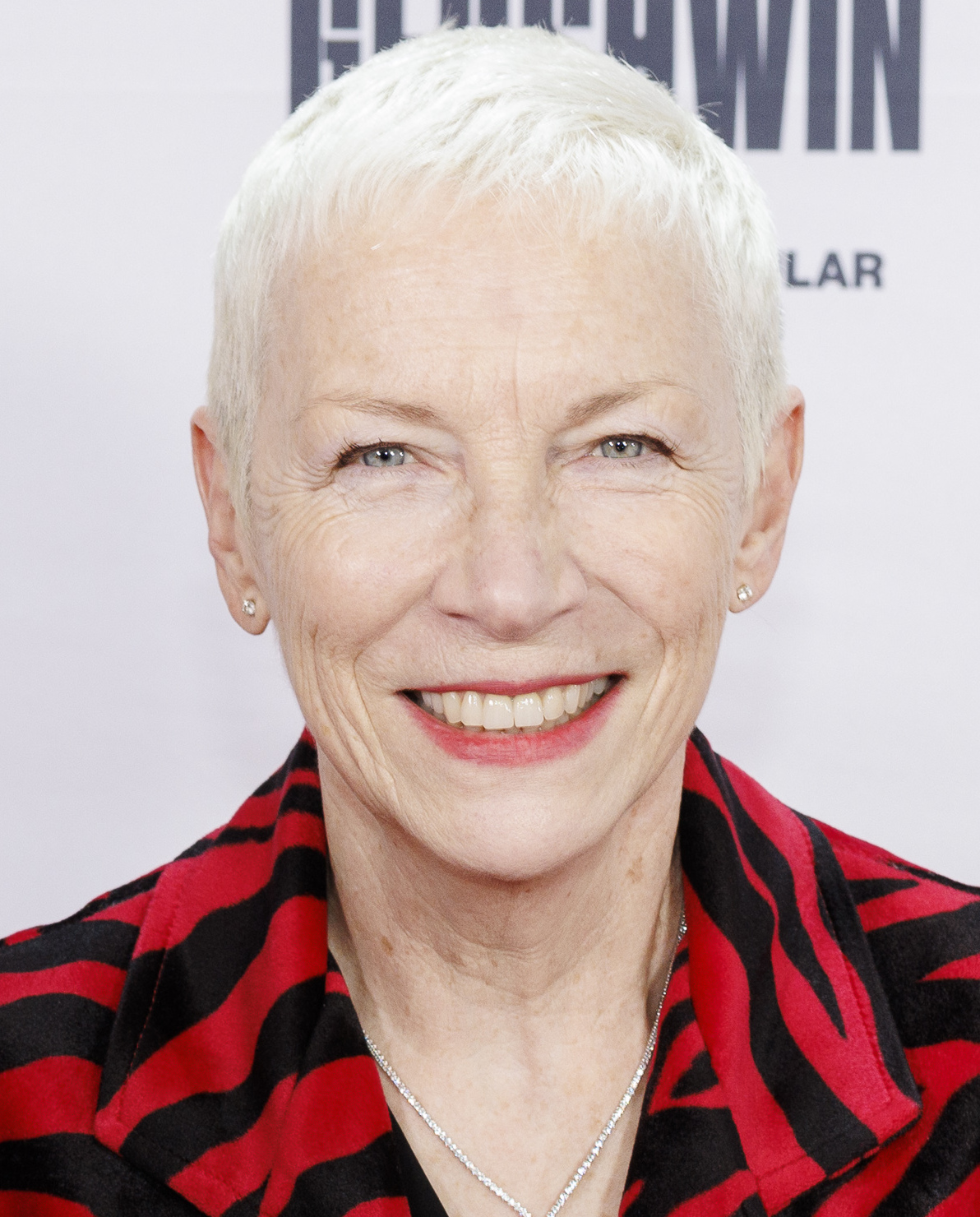
- Lennox in 2023
- Born: Ann Lennox; 25 December 1954 (age 71); Aberdeen, Scotland
- Education: Royal Academy of Music
- Occupations: Singer-songwriter; musician; political activist; philanthropist
- Years active: 1976–present
- Spouses: Radha Raman (m. 1984; div. 1985); Uri Fruchtmann (m. 1988; div. 2000); Mitch Besser (m. 2012)
- Children: Lola; Tali
- Relatives: Richard E. Besser (brother-in-law)
- Musical career
- Genres: Pop; rock; blue-eyed soul; new wave; R&B; synth-pop; electronic; jazz
- Instruments: Vocals; piano; keyboards
- Labels: RCA; Arista; Island; Decca
- Formerly of: The Catch; the Tourists; Eurythmics
- Website: annielennox.com

Ann Lennox (born 25 December 1954) is a Scottish singer-songwriter, political activist and philanthropist. After achieving moderate success in the late 1970s as part of the new wave band the Tourists, she and fellow musician Dave Stewart went on to achieve international success in the 1980s as Eurythmics. She appeared in the 1983 music video for "Sweet Dreams (Are Made of This)" with orange cropped hair and wearing a lounge suit. Subsequent hits with Eurythmics include "There Must Be an Angel (Playing with My Heart)", "Love Is a Stranger" and "Here Comes the Rain Again".

Lennox embarked on a solo career in 1992 with her debut album, Diva, which produced several hit singles including "Why" and "Walking on Broken Glass". The same year, she performed "Love Song for a Vampire" for Bram Stoker's Dracula. Her 1995 studio album, Medusa, includes cover versions of songs such as "No More 'I Love You's'" and "A Whiter Shade of Pale". To date, she has released six solo studio albums and a compilation album, The Annie Lennox Collection (2009). With eight Brit Awards, which includes being named Best British Female Artist a record six times, Lennox has been named the "Brits Champion of Champions". She has also collected four Grammy Awards and an MTV Video Music Award. In 2002, Lennox received a Billboard Century Award; the highest accolade from Billboard. In 2004, she received the Golden Globe and the Academy Award for Best Original Song for "Into the West", written for the soundtrack to the feature film The Lord of the Rings: The Return of the King.

Lennox's vocal range is contralto. She has been named "The Greatest White Soul Singer Alive", by VH1, and one of The 100 Greatest Singers of All Time, by Rolling Stone. In June 2013, the Official Charts Company called her "the most successful female British artist in UK music history". By June 2008, including her work with Eurythmics, Lennox had sold over 80 million records worldwide. As part of a one-hour symphony of British Music, Lennox performed "Little Bird" during the 2012 Summer Olympics closing ceremony, in London. At the 2015 Ivor Novello Awards, Lennox was made a fellow of the British Academy of Songwriters, Composers and Authors (The Ivors Academy), the first woman to receive the honour. Lennox and her Eurythmics partner, Dave Stewart, were inducted into the Songwriters Hall of Fame, in 2020, and the duo were inducted into the Rock and Roll Hall of Fame, in 2022.

Lennox is also a political and social activist, raising money and awareness for HIV/AIDS, as it affects women and children in Africa. She founded the Sing campaign, in 2007, and founded a women's empowerment charity called The Circle, in 2008. In 2011, Lennox was appointed an OBE by Queen Elizabeth II for her "tireless charity campaigns and championing of humanitarian causes". On 4 June 2012, she performed at the Queen's Diamond Jubilee Concert in front of Buckingham Palace. In 2017, Lennox was appointed Glasgow Caledonian University's first female chancellor.

== Early life ==
=== Family ===
Lennox was born on Christmas Day 1954 in Torry, Aberdeen, Scotland. She is the daughter of Dorothy Farquharson (née Ferguson; 1930–2003) and Thomas Allison Lennox (1925–1986).

Both of Lennox's parents died of cancer.

In September 2012, Lennox featured in series 9 of the BBC's Who Do You Think You Are?, in which she discovered that her great-great-grandmother Jessie Fraser worked at the Broadford Flax Mill in Aberdeen. Her maternal grandmother, Dora Paton, was a dairy maid at the Balmoral Royal Estate and her maternal grandfather, William Ferguson, was a gamekeeper also at Balmoral.

=== Education ===
Lennox went to the Aberdeen High School for Girls (which has since become Harlaw Academy secondary school) where she was encouraged by her parents to explore her artistic qualities. She excelled at music, poetry and artwork. Here she learned to play the flute and the piano. She also sang in the choir and later played in symphony orchestras and military bands, and each year took part in the Aberdeen Music Festival. Lennox attended Dalcroze eurhythmics classes while at high school. Eurhythmics, with its English spelling, is an approach to music education developed by the Swiss composer Emile Jaques-Dalcroze. The word eurhythmics is derived from Greek and means "good flow". The band, Eurythmics, adopted the French spelling.

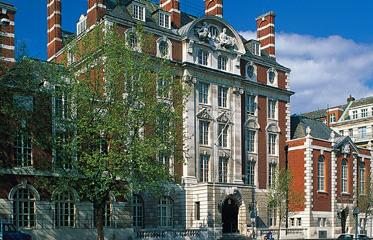
The Royal Academy of Music in London, where Lennox abandoned her classical studies in the early 1970s. She became a Fellow of the Academy in 1997 and was awarded an honorary doctorate from its affiliated college, the University of London, in 2017.

In 1971, Lennox began studying on a three-year Music Performance degree course at the Royal Academy of Music in London. It is one of a small number of quite elite British music conservatories predominantly for classical music study at third level. At college in London she studied flute, piano and harpsichord for nearly three years. Although Lennox studied for close to the duration of the course she did not finish her studies at the college. She found the amount of time devoted to music practice required to become a professional classical musician obsessive and felt that she was unconnected with the "whole cultural aspect". Lennox lived on a student grant and worked at part-time jobs for extra money. She was unhappy with the direction she was going in and doubted her own talent when compared to her student contemporaries while at the Royal Academy and deliberated on what other direction she could take.

Lennox's flute teacher's final report stated: "Ann has not always been sure of where to direct her efforts, though lately she has been more committed. She is very, very able, however." Two years later, Lennox reported to the academy: "I have had to work as a waitress, barmaid and shop assistant to keep me when not in musical work." Lennox attended the Dalcroze eurhythmics Spring Course of 1974. She also played and sang with a few bands, such as Windsong, during the period of her course.

In 2017, the academy awarded her an honorary degree of Doctorate. In her acceptance speech of her honorary Doctorate, Lennox said, "Many of my life experiences can be described as unconventional, idiosyncratic and synchronistic—as this event [graduation ceremony] proves to be no exception. By rights, I feel I'm not entitled to be here—but as John Lennon once famously said ... 'Life is what happens to you while you're making other plans.'"

== Career ==
=== 1976–1990: Dragon's Playground, the Tourists and Eurythmics ===
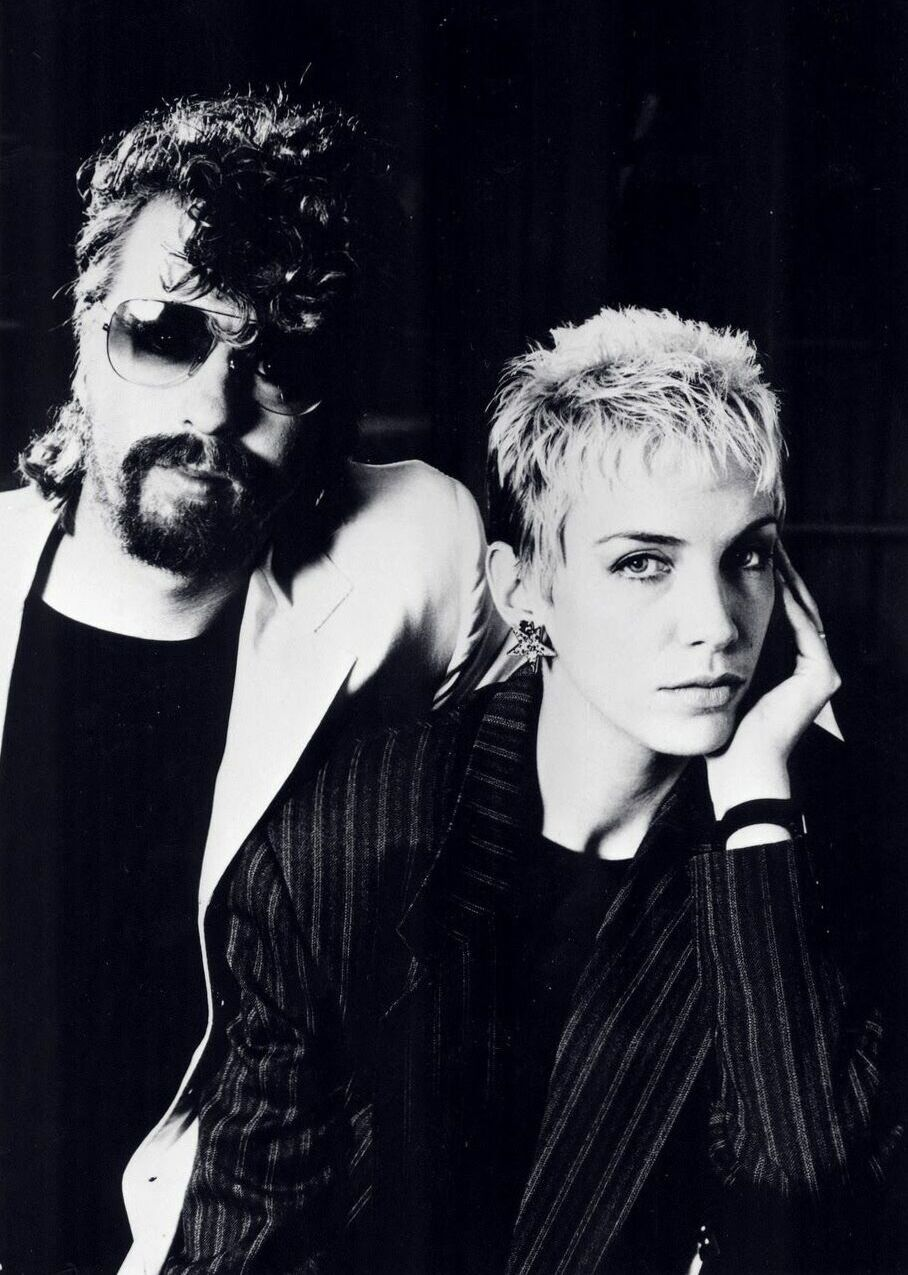
Lennox (right) with Dave Stewart as part of Eurythmics in 1985

In 1976, Lennox was a flute player with a band called Dragon's Playground, leaving before they appeared on ITV's talent show New Faces. From 1977 to 1980, she was the lead singer of the Tourists, a British pop band and her first collaboration with Dave Stewart.

Lennox and Stewart's second collaboration, the 1980s synth-pop duo Eurythmics, resulted in her most notable fame, as the duo's alto, soul-tinged lead singer. Early in Eurythmics' career, Lennox was known for her androgyny, wearing suits and once impersonating Elvis Presley. Eurythmics released a long line of hit singles in the 1980s, including "Sweet Dreams (Are Made of This)" (a US number one and UK number two), "There Must Be an Angel (Playing with My Heart)" (UK number one), "Love Is a Stranger", "Here Comes the Rain Again", "Sisters Are Doin' It for Themselves", "Who's That Girl?", "Would I Lie to You?" (Australian number one), "Missionary Man" (Grammy Award for Best Rock Performance by a Duo or Group), "You Have Placed a Chill in My Heart", "Thorn in My Side", "The Miracle of Love" and "Don't Ask Me Why". Although Eurythmics never officially disbanded, Lennox made a fairly clear break from Stewart in 1990. Thereafter, she began her solo career.

Lennox and Stewart reconvened Eurythmics in the late 1990s, resulting in the 1999 release of Peace, the band's first album of new material in ten years. A subsequent concert tour was completed, with profits going to Greenpeace and Amnesty International. Lennox has received eight Brit Awards, including being named Best British Female Artist a record six times. Four of the awards were given during her time with Eurythmics, and another was given to the duo for Outstanding Contribution to Music in 1999.

The 1988 single "Put a Little Love in Your Heart" was a duet with Al Green recorded for the soundtrack of the movie Scrooged. Though it was produced by Dave Stewart, it was credited to Lennox and Green. This one-off single peaked at No. 9 on the US Billboard Hot 100, 6 in Australia, and was a top 40 hit in the UK. Lennox performed the song "Ev'ry Time We Say Goodbye", a Cole Porter song, that same year for a cameo appearance in the Derek Jarman film Edward II. She then appeared with David Bowie and the surviving members of Queen at 1992's Freddie Mercury Tribute Concert at London's Wembley Stadium, performing "Under Pressure".

=== 1992–1993: Solo career and Diva ===
Lennox in a promotional shoot for Diva, c. 1992

Lennox began working with former Trevor Horn protégé Stephen Lipson, beginning with her 1992 solo debut album, Diva. During an interview with the BBC in 1992 ahead of the release of the album, Lennox claimed that she debated with herself whether to begin writing a solo album, claiming that she thought of other things she could do but concluded "it all comes back to writing songs", stating that songwriting "affirms who I am" and acknowledging being a songwriter as "part of my identify". Lennox claimed that, during the songwriting process for Diva, she did "not miss Dave [Stewart]" (her partner with Eurythmics), claiming that they both "spent so much time together it became frayed". She did, however, state that she wishes Dave well and that she was "sure he would say the same for me".

Diva charted at No. 1 in the UK, No. 7 in Australia, No. 6 in Germany, and No. 23 in the US where it went double platinum. Lennox's profile was boosted by Diva's singles, which included "Why" and "Walking on Broken Glass". "Why" won an MTV Award for Best Female Video at the 1992 MTV Video Music Awards, while the video for "Walking on Broken Glass", set in the Rococo period, featured actors Hugh Laurie and John Malkovich. "Little Bird" also formed a double A-side with "Love Song for a Vampire", a soundtrack cut for Francis Ford Coppola's 1992 movie Bram Stoker's Dracula. The B-side of her single "Precious" was a self-penned song called "Step by Step", which was later a hit for Whitney Houston for the soundtrack of the film The Preacher's Wife. The song "Keep Young and Beautiful" was included on the CD release as a bonus track (the original vinyl album had only ten tracks).

The album entered the UK album chart at no.1 and has since sold over 1.2 million copies in the UK alone, being certified quadruple platinum. It was also a success in the US where it was a top 30 hit and has sold in excess of 2.7 million copies. In 1993, the album was included in Q magazine's list of the "50 Best Albums of 1992". Rolling Stone magazine (25 June 1992, p. 41) described the album as "...state-of-the-art soul pop..." and it is included in Rolling Stone's (13 May 1999, p. 56) "Essential Recordings of the 90's" list. The album won Best British Album at the 1993 Brit Awards.

=== 1995–2000: Medusa and return to Eurythmics ===
Although Lennox's profile decreased for a period because of her desire to bring up her two children away from the media's glare, she continued to record. Her second album, Medusa, was released in March 1995. It consisted solely of cover songs, all originally recorded by male artists including Bob Marley, The Clash and Neil Young. It entered the UK album chart at No. 1 and peaked in Australia at No. 5, and in the US at number 11, spending 60 weeks on the Billboard 200 chart and selling over 2 million to date in the United States. It has achieved double platinum status in both the UK and the US. The album yielded four UK singles: "No More 'I Love You's'" (which entered the UK singles chart at No. 2, Lennox's highest-ever solo peak), "A Whiter Shade of Pale", "Waiting in Vain" and "Something So Right". The album was nominated for Best Pop Vocal Album at the Grammy Awards of 1996, losing to Turbulent Indigo by Joni Mitchell and instead winning Best Female Pop Vocal Performance for the single "No More 'I Love You's'". Although Lennox declined to tour for the album, she did perform a large scale one-off concert in New York's Central Park, which was filmed and later released on home video. Lennox provided an extensive solo vocal performance (without lyrics) for the soundtrack score of the film Apollo 13 in 1995.

Managed by Simon Fuller since the beginning of her solo career, he said that Lennox played an important but unheralded role in the success of the Spice Girls, encouraging the group to "ham up" their characters, which helped them top the charts around the world. In 1997, Lennox re-recorded the Eurythmics track "Angel" for the Diana, Princess of Wales: Tribute album, and also recorded the song "Mama" for The Avengers soundtrack album. In 1998, following the death of a mutual friend (former Tourists member Peet Coombes), she re-united with Dave Stewart. Following their first performance together in eight years at a record company party, Stewart and Lennox began writing and recording together for the first time since 1989. This resulted in the album Peace. The title was designed to reflect the duo's ongoing concern with global conflict and world peace. The record was promoted with a concert on the Greenpeace vessel Rainbow Warrior II, where they played a mixture of old and new songs. "I Saved the World Today" was the lead single, reaching number eleven on the UK singles chart. Another single, released at the beginning of 2000, "17 Again", made the UK top 40, and topped the US dance chart. In 2002, Lennox received a Billboard Century Award; the highest accolade from Billboard magazine, with editor-in-chief Timothy White describing her as one of "the most original and unforgettably affecting artists in the modern annals of popular music."

=== 2003–2007: Bare and Eurythmics return ===
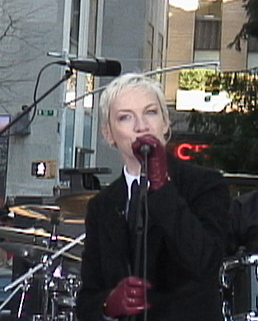
Lennox performing with Eurythmics on The Today Show during their 2005 reunion

In 2003, Lennox released her third solo album, Bare. The album peaked at No. 3 in the UK, No. 10 in Australia, and No. 4 in the US—her highest-charting album in the US to date. She embarked on her first tour as a solo artist to promote the album. The tour, simply titled Solo Tour, pre-dated the release of the album and visited both the US and Europe, with only a two-night stop in the UK at Sadler's Wells Theatre in London. The album has been certified Gold in both the UK and the US and was nominated for Best Pop Album at the 46th Grammy Awards. The album was released with a DVD which included interviews and acoustic versions of songs by Lennox.

In 2004, Lennox won the Academy Award for Best Song for "Into the West" from the film The Lord of the Rings: The Return of the King, which she co-wrote with screenwriter Fran Walsh and composer Howard Shore. Lennox performed the song live at the 76th Academy Awards. The song also won a Grammy award and a Golden Globe award. She had previously recorded "Use Well the Days" for the movie, which incorporates a number of quotations from Tolkien in its lyrics. This features on a bonus DVD included with the "special edition" of the movie's soundtrack CD. In mid-2004, Lennox embarked on an extensive North American tour with Sting. In July 2005, Lennox performed at Live 8 in Hyde Park, London, along with Madonna, Sting and other popular musicians.

In 2005, Lennox and Stewart collaborated on two new songs for their Eurythmics compilation album, Ultimate Collection, of which "I've Got a Life" was released as a single in October 2005. The promotional video for the song features Lennox and Stewart performing in the present day, with images of past Eurythmics videos playing on television screens behind them. The single peaked at number fourteen in the UK Singles Chart and was a number-one US dance hit. On 14 November 2005, Sony BMG repackaged and released Eurythmics' back catalogue as 2005 Deluxe Edition Reissues. Lennox also collaborated with Herbie Hancock doing the song "Hush, Hush, Hush" on his collaboration album, Possibilities in August 2005.

=== 2007–2008: Songs of Mass Destruction and AIDS activism ===
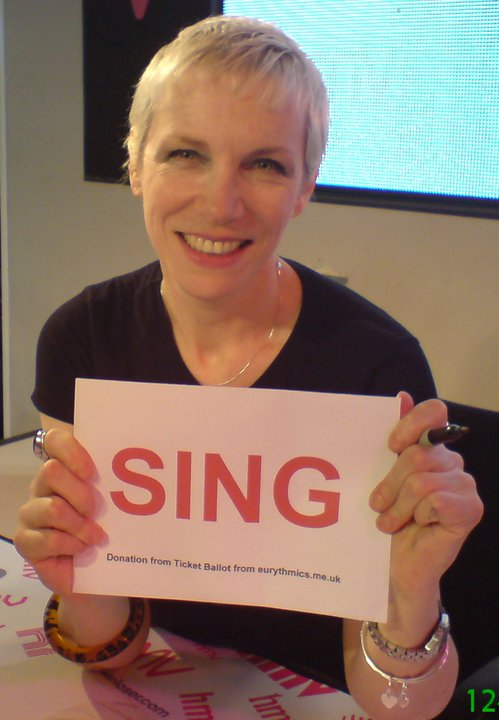
After releasing "Sing" with 23 other invited singers, Lennox launched the Sing campaign in 2007.

Ending her long association with Stephen Lipson, Lennox's fourth solo album, Songs of Mass Destruction, was recorded in Los Angeles with veteran producer Glen Ballard (known for producing Alanis Morissette's album, Jagged Little Pill). It was released on 1 October 2007, and was the last studio album of Lennox's contract with BMG. It peaked at No. 7 in the UK and No. 9 in the US. Lennox stated that she believed the album consisted of "twelve strong, powerful, really emotive songs that people can connect to". If she achieves that, she says, "I can feel proud of [it], no matter if it sells ten copies or 50 million." Lennox described it as "a dark album, but the world is a dark place. It's fraught, it's turbulent. Most people's lives are underscored with dramas of all kinds: there's ups, there's downs—the flickering candle." She added, "Half the people are drinking or drugging themselves to numb it. A lot of people are in pain."

The album's first single was "Dark Road", released on 24 September 2007. Another song on the album, "Sing", is a collaboration between Lennox and 23 prominent female artists: Anastacia, Isobel Campbell, Dido, Céline Dion, Melissa Etheridge, Fergie, Beth Gibbons, Faith Hill, Angelique Kidjo, Beverley Knight, Gladys Knight, k.d. lang, Madonna, Sarah McLachlan, Beth Orton, Pink, Kelis, Bonnie Raitt, Shakira, Shingai Shoniwa, Joss Stone, Sugababes, KT Tunstall and Martha Wainwright. The song was recorded to raise money and awareness for the HIV/AIDS organisation Treatment Action Campaign. Included among the group of vocalists are TAC activist members' own vocal group known as The Generics, whose CD of music inspired Lennox to make "Sing". To promote Songs of Mass Destruction, Lennox embarked on a primarily North American tour called Annie Lennox Sings, which lasted throughout October and November 2007.

=== 2008–2009: The Annie Lennox Collection and departure from Sony ===
Finishing out her contract with Sony BMG, Lennox released the compilation album The Annie Lennox Collection. Initially intended for release in September 2008, the release date was pushed back several months to allow Lennox to recuperate from a back injury. The compilation was eventually released in the US on 17 February 2009, and in the UK and Europe on 9 March 2009. Included on the track listing are songs from her four solo albums, one from the Bram Stoker's Dracula soundtrack, and two new songs. One of these is a cover of Ash's single, "Shining Light". The other is a cover of a song by the English band Keane, originally the B-side of their first single in 2000. Lennox renamed the song from its original title "Closer Now" to "Pattern of My Life". A limited 3-disc edition of the album included a DVD compilation featuring most of Lennox's solo videos since 1992, and also featured a second CD of rarer songs including a version of R.E.M.'s "Everybody Hurts" with Alicia Keys and Lennox's Oscar-winning "Into the West" from the third Lord of the Rings film. The album entered the UK Album Chart at No. 2 and remained in the top 10 for seven weeks.

Lennox's recording contract with Sony BMG concluded with the release of Songs of Mass Destruction and the subsequent retrospective album The Collection, and much was made in the press in late 2007/early 2008 about the apparent animosity between Lennox and the record company. Lennox stated that while on a trip to South Africa in December 2007 to appear at the 46664 campaign in Johannesburg, the regional company office of the label failed to return phone calls and e-mails she made to them for three weeks, and had completely failed to promote the Sing project as planned. Upon her return to the UK, Lennox met with the head of Sony BMG UK, Ged Docherty, who was "mortified" by the problems she had encountered with the South African branch. The debacle (partly inflamed by her blogging her dissatisfaction with the South African office) led to press reports that she was "dropped" by Sony BMG, which quickly clarified that their contract had been fulfilled and that it hoped she would consider signing a new one. The British tabloid, Daily Mirror, subsequently printed a retraction of its story about her being dropped by the label.

=== 2010–2019: A Christmas Cornucopia and Nostalgia ===
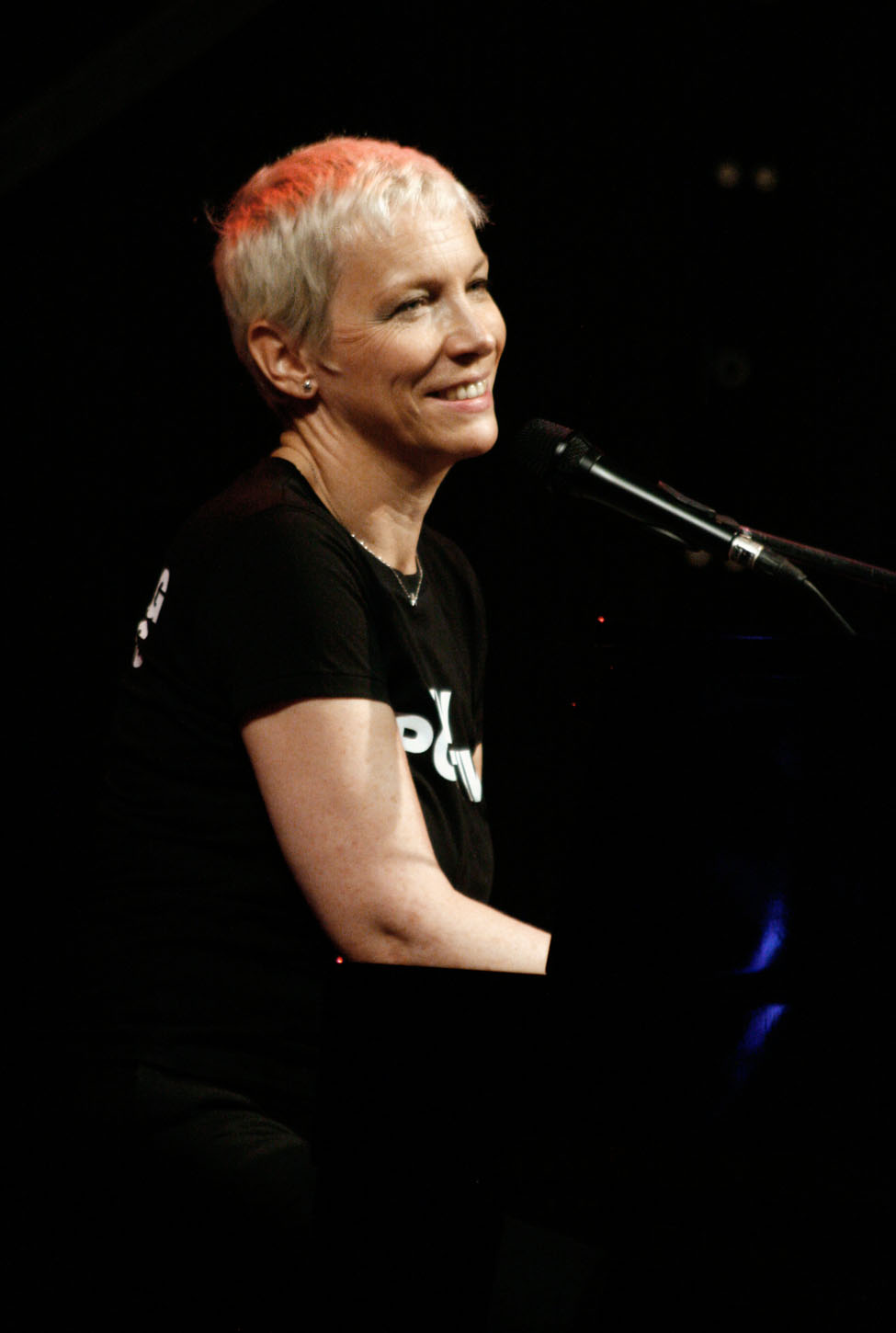
Lennox performing in Vienna during the Sing campaign in 2010

In August 2010, Lennox signed a new contract with Island Records in the UK and Decca Records in the US, both part of the Universal Music Group. Her first release was a Christmas album entitled A Christmas Cornucopia, issued on 15 November 2010. The album is a collection of Lennox's interpretations of traditional festive songs such as "Silent Night" and "The First Noel", along with one new composition, "Universal Child", which was released as a download-only single on 13 October 2010. Lennox had previously showcased the song on the American Idol Gives Back TV show in April 2010. She sang the song "Angels from the Realms of Glory" from the album for the TNT special Christmas in Washington.

A music video was produced for a second single from the album, "God Rest Ye Merry Gentlemen". Lennox also performed the track on the UK chat show Loose Women in December 2010, and was also interviewed. According to Metacritic, A Christmas Cornucopia has gained "generally favourable reviews". Ian Wade of BBC Music gave the album a very positive review, saying "this collection could find itself becoming as much a part of the holiday season as arguments with loved ones." Sal Cinquemani of Slant Magazine awarded the album 3.5/5 and said "Lennox seems more inspired on A Christmas Cornucopia than she has in years." John Hunt of Qatar Today magazine gave the album 9/10 and said "in particular, the vocal work and musical arrangement of 'God Rest Ye Merry Gentlemen' are impactful to the point of being intimidating."

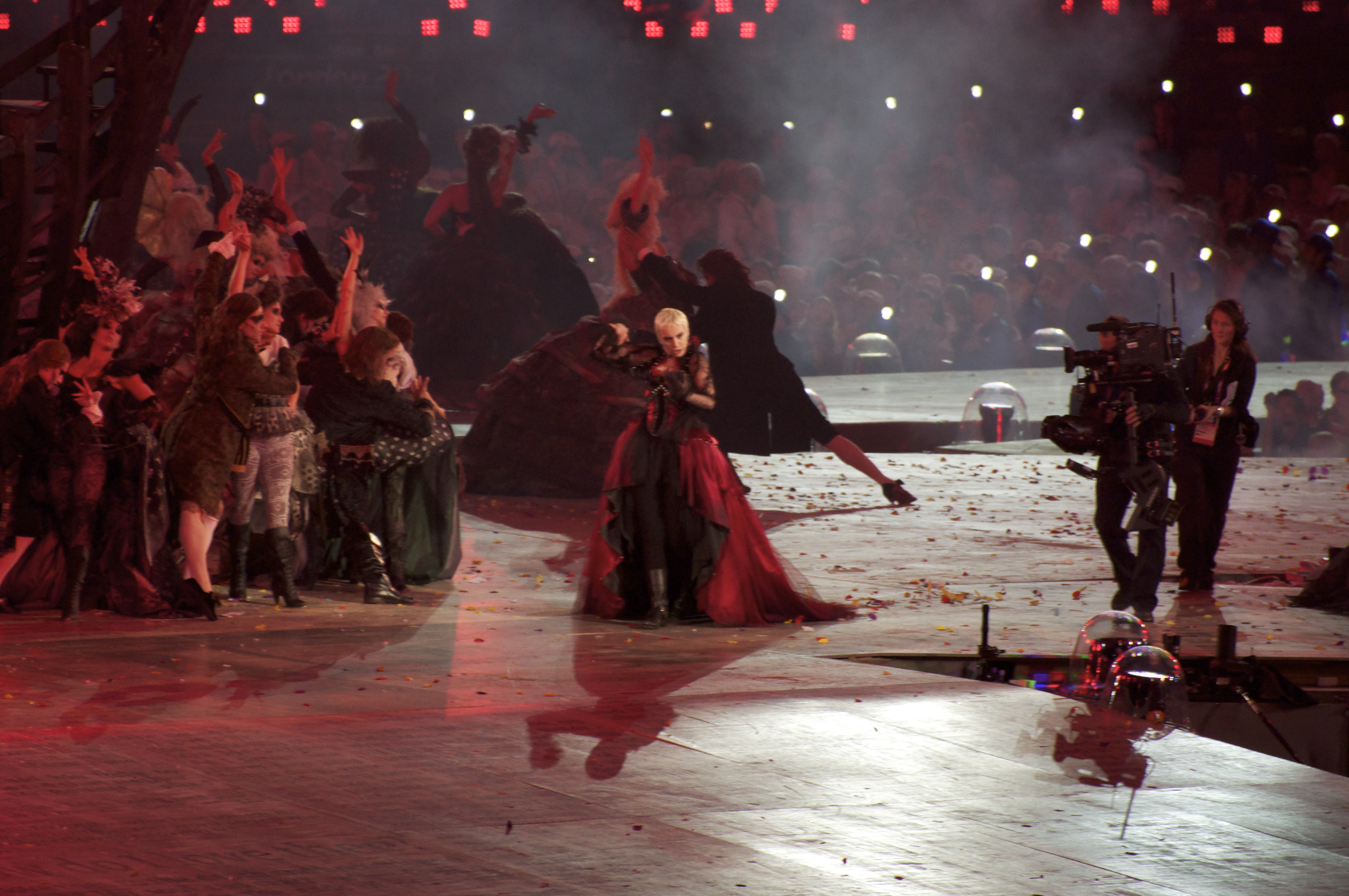
Lennox performing "Little Bird" during the symphony of British Music segment at the 2012 Summer Olympics closing ceremony in London

On 4 June 2012, Lennox performed, as part of the Queen's Diamond Jubilee Concert, in front of Buckingham Palace in London and on 12 August she performed "Little Bird" at the 2012 Summer Olympics Closing Ceremony.

In October 2014, Lennox released her sixth solo album, Nostalgia. The album is a collection of Lennox's childhood favourite soul, jazz and blues songs. Critic Mike Wass of Idolator stated that Lennox "puts her own inimitable spin" on the selected tracks. The lead single "I Put a Spell on You" received its first radio play on 15 September 2014 by Ken Bruce on BBC Radio 2. Upon release, the album entered the UK and US Top 10, and reached number one on the US Billboard Top Jazz Albums chart. The album was nominated for a Grammy Award for Best Traditional Pop Vocal Album. On 28 January 2015, Lennox performed a live concert at the Orpheum Theatre in Los Angeles entitled An Evening of Nostalgia with Annie Lennox. The show aired on PBS in the US in April 2015, and was released on DVD and Blu-ray internationally in May 2015.

=== 2019–present: Lepidoptera ===
In May 2019, Lennox released Lepidoptera, an EP containing four extemporised piano songs. The album serves as a companion piece to her art installation "Now I Let You Go..." at MASS moca. It is Lennox's first independently distributed record. Since 2019, Lennox has joined with Dave Stewart on two occasions for Eurythmics reunions—for Sting's 30th We'll Be Together Benefit Concert and the other in 2022 for their Rock and Roll Hall of Fame induction ceremony. They performed together on 9 December 2019 at the Sting benefit concert at New York City's Beacon Theatre, playing "Would I Lie to You?", "Here Comes the Rain Again" and "Sweet Dreams (Are Made of This)", before returning to join in the finale performance of Journey's "Don't Stop Believin'" along with the night's other performers. In 2022, they performed at the Microsoft Theater in Los Angeles, California for their induction to the Rock and Roll Hall of Fame, performing "Would I Lie to You?", "Missionary Man" and "Sweet Dreams (Are Made of This)" as part of the 2022 Rock and Roll Hall of Fame induction ceremony. They were inducted by U2's the Edge.

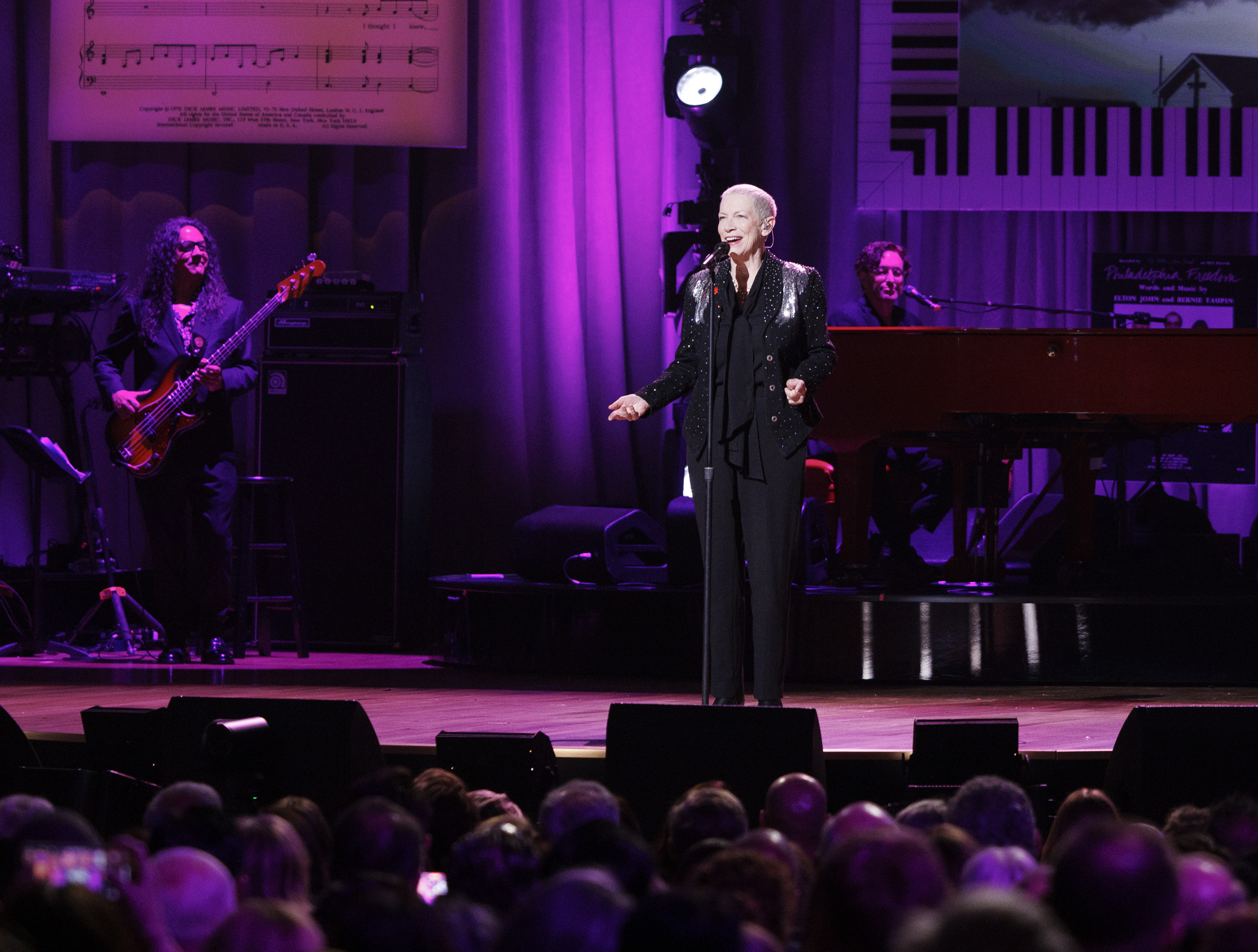
Lennox performing in March 2024 at the Gershwin Prize for Popular Song tribute concert

In 2024, she performed at the Gershwin Prize for Popular Song Tribute Concert in Washington, D.C. to honour both Elton John and Bernie Taupin. Her chancellorship of Glasgow Caledonian University came to an end in mid-2024, and was succeeded by Anne-Marie Imafidon. Her legacy as chancellor of the university includes a building being renamed the Annie Lennox Building. At the unveiling, Lennox said it was "an incredible honour to have such a wonderful building on the Glasgow Caledonian University campus named after me". During the 2025 California wildfires in January, Lennox volunteered with a local Los Angeles based charity Project Angel Food to deliver food amid relief efforts.

In March 2025, Lennox played her first live performance in six years at the Royal Albert Hall. The show, titled Sisters: Annie Lennox and Friends, was organised to celebrate International Women's Day. During the performance, Lennox was joined by notable female performers including Rioghnach Connolly, Celeste and Nadine Shah. In the same month, Lennox expressed concerns over proposed budget cuts by UK Prime Minister Keir Starmer, citing that such cuts "would affect us all in the end". She said that a "very, very tiny amount" of the UK budget was allocated to foreign and development aid, and argued that "the impact around the world will affect us in the end, when you have countries that have so many that are being displaced, it has a knock-on effect as well", adding that "it benefits us to invest". In 2025, her 1995 single "No More 'I Love You's'", featured in an episode of American thriller series Good American Family.

== Public image ==
=== Charity and political activism ===
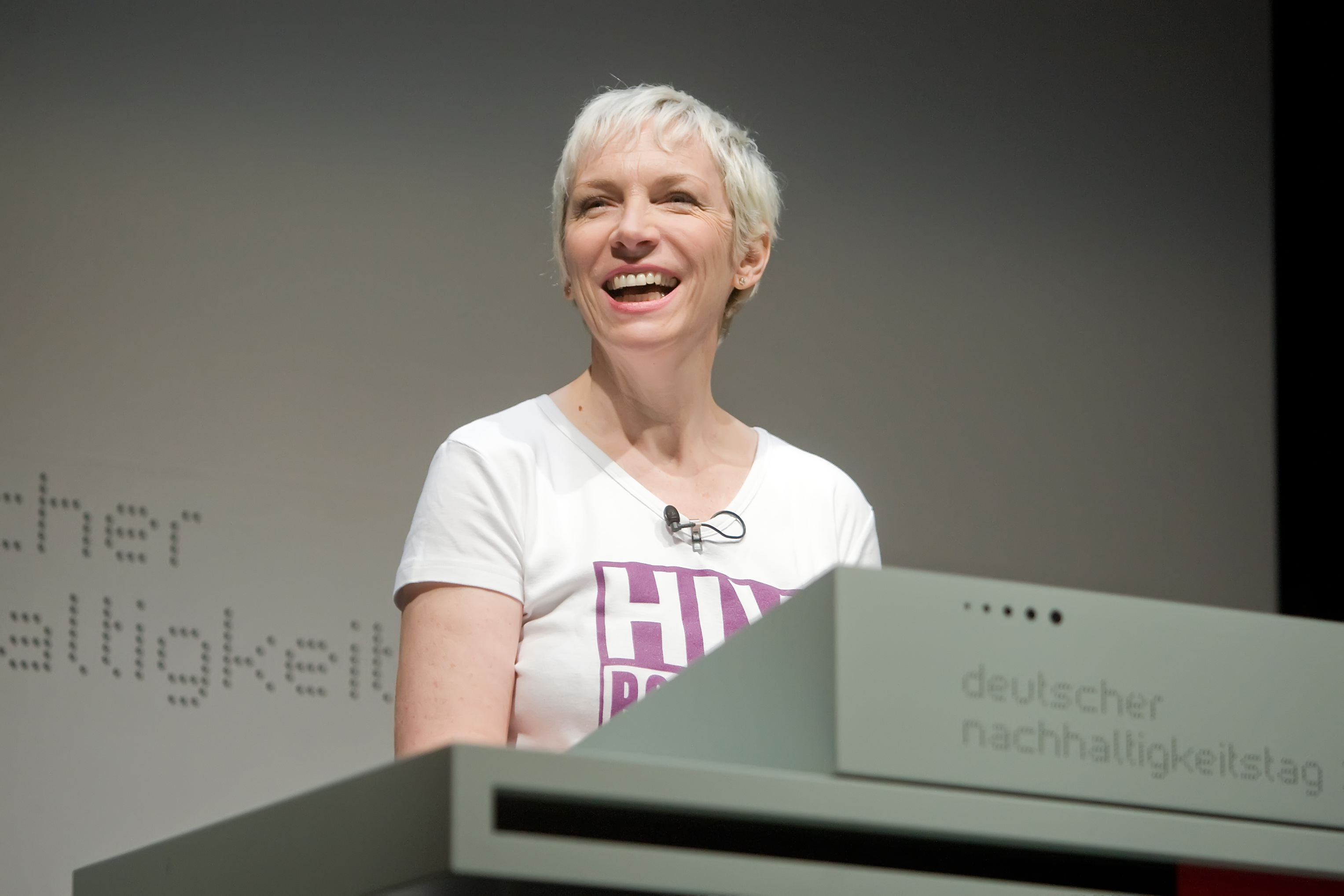
HIV campaigner Lennox in Germany ahead of World AIDS Day in 2008

Lennox appeared on stage at the 1988 Nelson Mandela 70th Birthday Concert and commenced activist work with the Sing Foundation afterwards. In 1990, Lennox recorded a version of Cole Porter's "Ev'ry Time We Say Goodbye" for the Cole Porter tribute album Red Hot + Blue, a benefit for AIDS awareness. A video was also produced. Lennox has been a public supporter of Amnesty International and Greenpeace for many years, and she and Dave Stewart donated all of the profits from Eurythmics' 1999 Peacetour to both charities. Concerned by Tibet freedom, she supported Amnesty International campaigns for the release of Tibetan prisoners Palden Gyatso and Ngawang Choephel.

Lennox was a signatory to the "No war on Iraq" campaign started in 2003, her album "Songs of Mass Destruction" and her rendition of "Dark Road" were deeply critical of the war. In conversation with Melvyn Bragg in 2006, she expressed her anger at how the UK was misled over Iraq's alleged 'weapons of mass destruction'.

After being forced to pull out of performing at Live Aid held at Wembley Stadium in 1985 due to a serious throat infection, Lennox appeared at Live 8 held in Hyde Park, London in 2005. In 2006, in response to her humanitarian work, Lennox became patron of the Master's Course in Humanitarian and Development Practice for Oxford Brookes University. In October 2006, Lennox spoke at the British House of Commons about the need for children in the UK to help their counterparts in Africa. On 25 April 2007, Lennox performed "Bridge over Troubled Water" during the American Idol "Idol Gives Back" fundraising drive. Lennox's 2007 song "Sing" was born out of her involvement with Nelson Mandela's 46664 campaign and Treatment Action Campaign (TAC), both of which are human rights groups which seek education and health care for those affected by HIV. In December 2007, Lennox established The SING Campaign, an organisation dedicated to raising funds and awareness for women and children affected by HIV and AIDS.

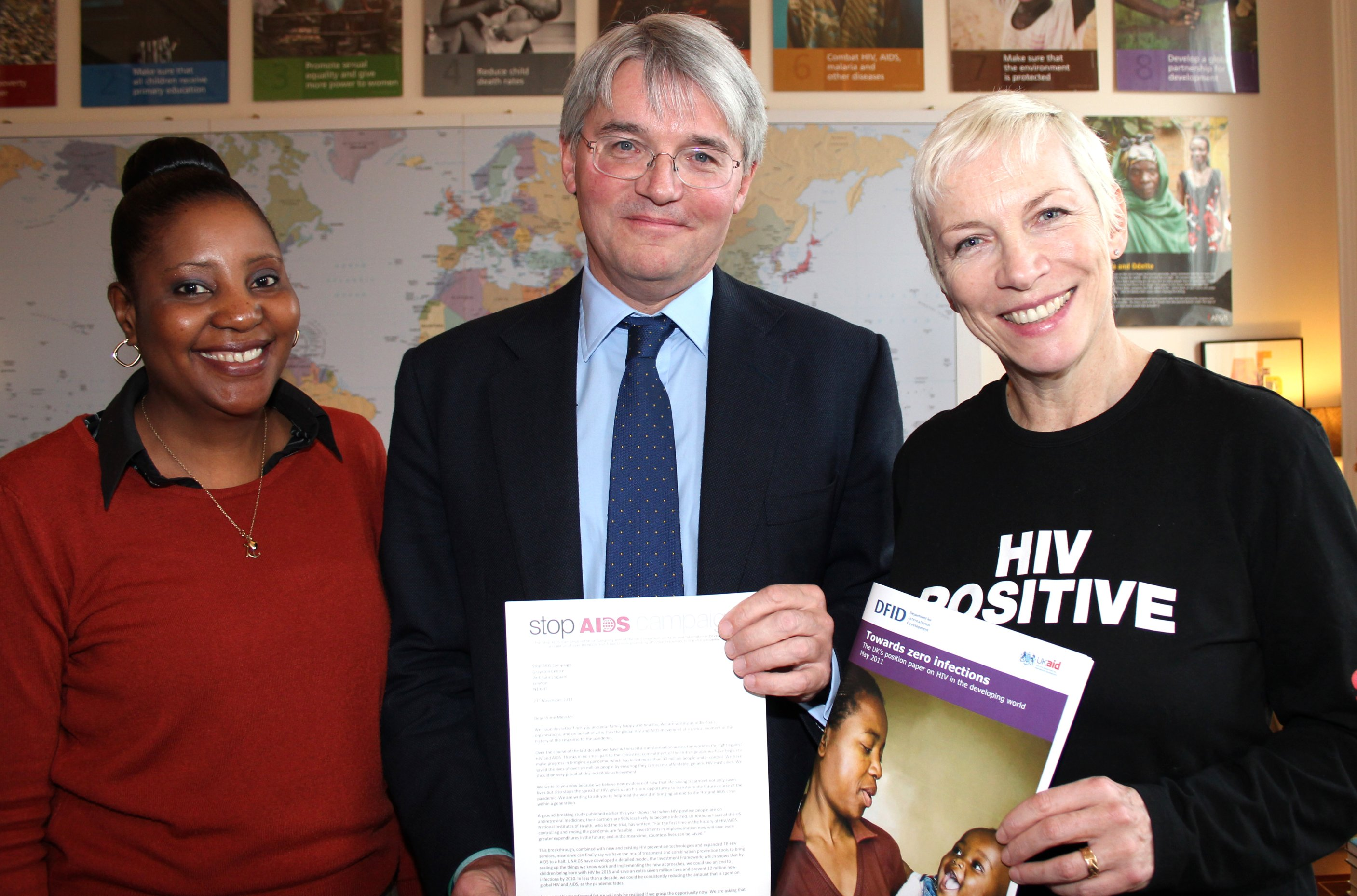
HIV campaigners, Memory Sachikonye (left) and Lennox (right) meet with the UK's Secretary of State for International Development Andrew Mitchell in December 2011.

On 11 December 2007, she performed in the Nobel Peace Prize Concert in Oslo, together with a variety of artists, which was broadcast to over 100 countries. Lennox appeared at the Nelson Mandela 90th Birthday Tribute in June 2008 and then led a rally against the Gaza War in London on 3 January 2009.

In 2008, Lennox founded The Circle of Women, known as The Circle, a private charitable organisation to network and fund-raise for women's projects around the world. Also in 2008, Lennox backed the principle of an independent Scotland.

Lennox opened the 2009 Edinburgh Festival of Politics with commentary on Pope Benedict XVI's approach to HIV/AIDS prevention in Africa. She said that the Pope's denunciation of condoms on his recent tour of Africa had caused "tremendous harm" and she criticised the Roman Catholic Church for causing widespread confusion on the continent. Lennox also condemned the media's obsession with "celebrity culture" for keeping the AIDS pandemic off the front page. During her address, Lennox wore a T-shirt emblazoned with the words "HIV positive". Lennox wore similar T-shirts at the 25th Anniversary Rock & Roll Hall of Fame concert at Madison Square Garden on 30 October 2009, during her appearance on The Graham Norton Show on 30 November 2009 (where she performed the new song "Full Steam", a duet with singer David Gray), during a recorded performance for American Idol during a 21 April 2010 fundraiser, entitled Idol Gives Back, and during a performance on the live Comic Relief show on 18 March 2011.

"She is one of those exemplary human beings who chose to put her success in her chosen career to work in order to benefit others. She is a true friend of Africa and of South Africa. Her Aids activism in general, and support for the treatment action campaign in-particular, contributed significantly to turning the pandemic around in our country."

— Archbishop Desmond Tutu pays tribute to Annie Lennox in November 2013.

In November 2009, Lennox was awarded the Peace Summit Award 2009 by the World Summit of Nobel Peace Laureates for her engagement in the fight against the HIV pandemic in South Africa. In June 2010, she was named as a UNESCO Goodwill Ambassador for AIDS, a role that continues as of August 2013. Lennox also works with other organisations such as Oxfam, Amnesty International and the British Red Cross in regard to the issue. Lennox also supports the Burma Campaign UK, a non-governmental organisation that addresses the suffering in Burma and promotes democratisation.

In December 2010, it was confirmed that Lennox was in the New Years Honours List and would become an Officer of the Order of the British Empire (OBE) in recognition of her humanitarian work. She received the award from Queen Elizabeth II at Buckingham Palace on 28 June 2011.

In November 2013, Lennox received the Music Industry Trusts Award for her career achievements in music and her charity commitments. Elton John said of her award; "It is so well deserved and not only for your extraordinary contribution to music and songwriting but also for your outstanding and tireless work as an HIV and AIDS activist and supporter of women's rights," while Adele stated; "Annie Lennox has been a constant part of my life. An example of a brilliant talent that exudes excellence and influence on everyone."

In 2015, Lennox attended, performed at and hosted several charitable events including: the 50th Amnesty International Annual Conference where she was a guest speaker, Elton John and David Furnish's at home Gala in aid of the Elton John Aids Foundation where she performed, held a screening of He Named Me Malala, and hosted a Mothers2mothers 15th Anniversary gala. In 2016 Lennox was awarded the Elle Style Awards 'Outstanding Achievement' award, and the Royal Scottish Geographical Society award, the Livingstone Medal, in recognition of her outstanding contribution to the fight against AIDS and support of women's rights.

Lennox signed the October 2023 Artists4Ceasefire open letter calling for a ceasefire during the Israeli bombardment of Gaza. In February 2024, at the 66th Annual Grammy Awards, during an in memoriam segment where she performed Sinéad O'Connor's song Nothing Compares 2 U, Lennox repeated her call for a ceasefire and "peace in the world".

In 2023, Lennox became the Patron of Dalcroze UK, a charitable organisation that promotes Dalcroze eurhythmics, the approach to music education that inspired the band name, Eurythmics.

=== Relationship with the LGBTQ+ community ===
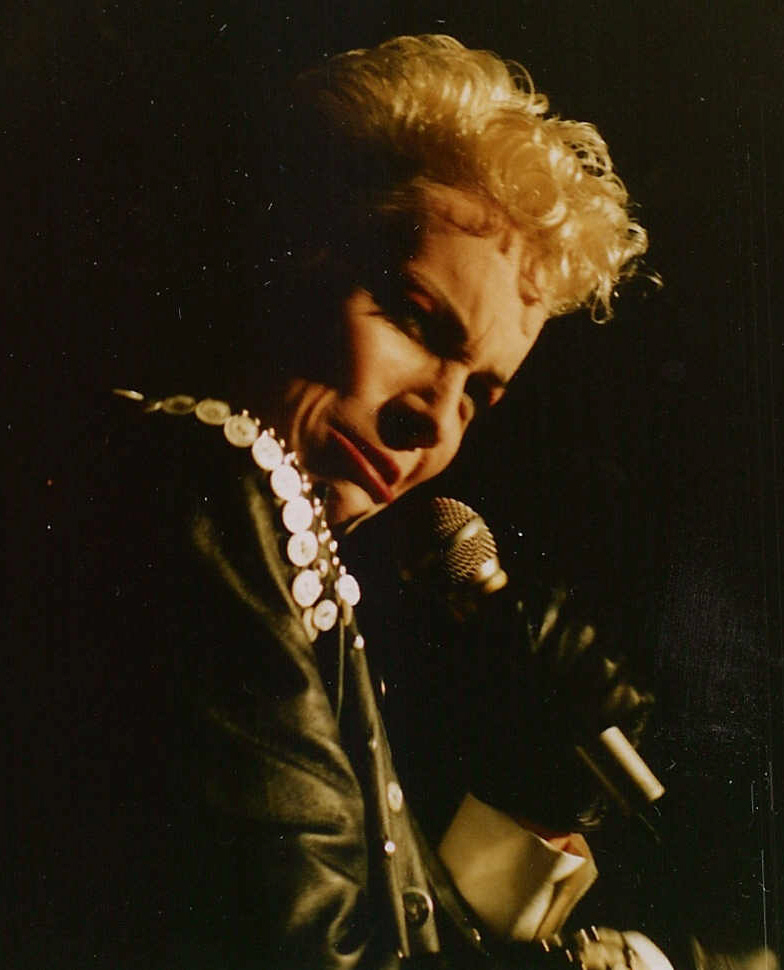
Lennox was known for her androgyny during the 1980s.

Lennox's longtime support for LGBT rights has helped garner a significant following within the LGBTQ+ community. According to The Advocate, "her distinctive voice and provocative stage persona have made Lennox a longtime gay icon."

She is known for her androgynous look in the 1980s, first widely seen in the 1983 music video for "Sweet Dreams (Are Made of This)" where she had close-cropped, orange-coloured hair, and wore a man's suit brandishing a cane, a video which made her a household name. The BBC wrote, "all eyes were on Annie Lennox, the singer whose powerful androgynous look defied the male gaze". In December 1983, Lennox and Culture Club singer Boy George (also known for his overtly androgynous appearance) appeared together on the front cover of the British music magazine Smash Hits. This was followed by Newsweek magazine in the US who ran an issue which featured Lennox and George on the cover of its 23 January 1984 edition with the caption Britain Rocks America – Again, marking the Second British Invasion. Her gender-bending image was also explored in other Eurythmics videos such as "Love Is a Stranger" and "Who's That Girl?" and she impersonated Elvis Presley at the 1984 Grammy Awards.

=== Exhibition ===
In conjunction with the Victoria and Albert Museum in London, Lennox put many items from her collection—costumes, accessories, photographs, awards, ephemera from her political campaigns, and personal belongings—on display. This collection, which spanned her entire career, along with music videos and interviews, became The House of Annie Lennox at the institution from 15 September 2011 to 26 February 2012. An expanded version of the exhibit was later installed at The Lowry in Salford, England from 17 March 2012 to 17 June, before moving to Aberdeen for twelve weeks.

=== Other work ===
On 31 March 2014, British retailer Marks & Spencer launched the new iteration of its 'Leading Ladies' marketing campaign featuring influential British women, which included Lennox, Emma Thompson, Rita Ora and Baroness Lawrence.

== Music videos ==
The video accompanying "Sweet Dreams (Are Made of This)", in which Annie Lennox appeared with closely cropped orange hair and wearing a man's business suit, was both striking and surreal. Lennox's extraordinary image was at odds with her female contemporaries.

— "Sweet Dreams: Remembering the Music Video That Broke the Mould for Female Pop Stars", BBC.

Both as part of Eurythmics and in her solo career, Lennox has made over 60 music promo videos. The 1987 Eurythmics album Savage and her 1992 solo album Diva were both accompanied by video albums, both directed by Sophie Muller. The music video for "Missionary Man" featured stop-animation techniques and received five nominations at the 1987 MTV Video Music Awards. Actors Hugh Laurie and John Malkovich appeared in the music video for "Walking on Broken Glass" in period costume, while the video for "Little Bird" paid homage to the different images and personas that have appeared in some of Lennox's previous videos. The clip features Lennox performing on stage with several lookalikes (male and female) that represent her personas from "Why", "Walking on Broken Glass", "Sweet Dreams", "Beethoven (I Love To Listen To)", "I Need a Man", "Thorn in My Side", "There Must Be an Angel", and even her stage image from the 1992 Freddie Mercury Tribute Concert.

== Legacy ==
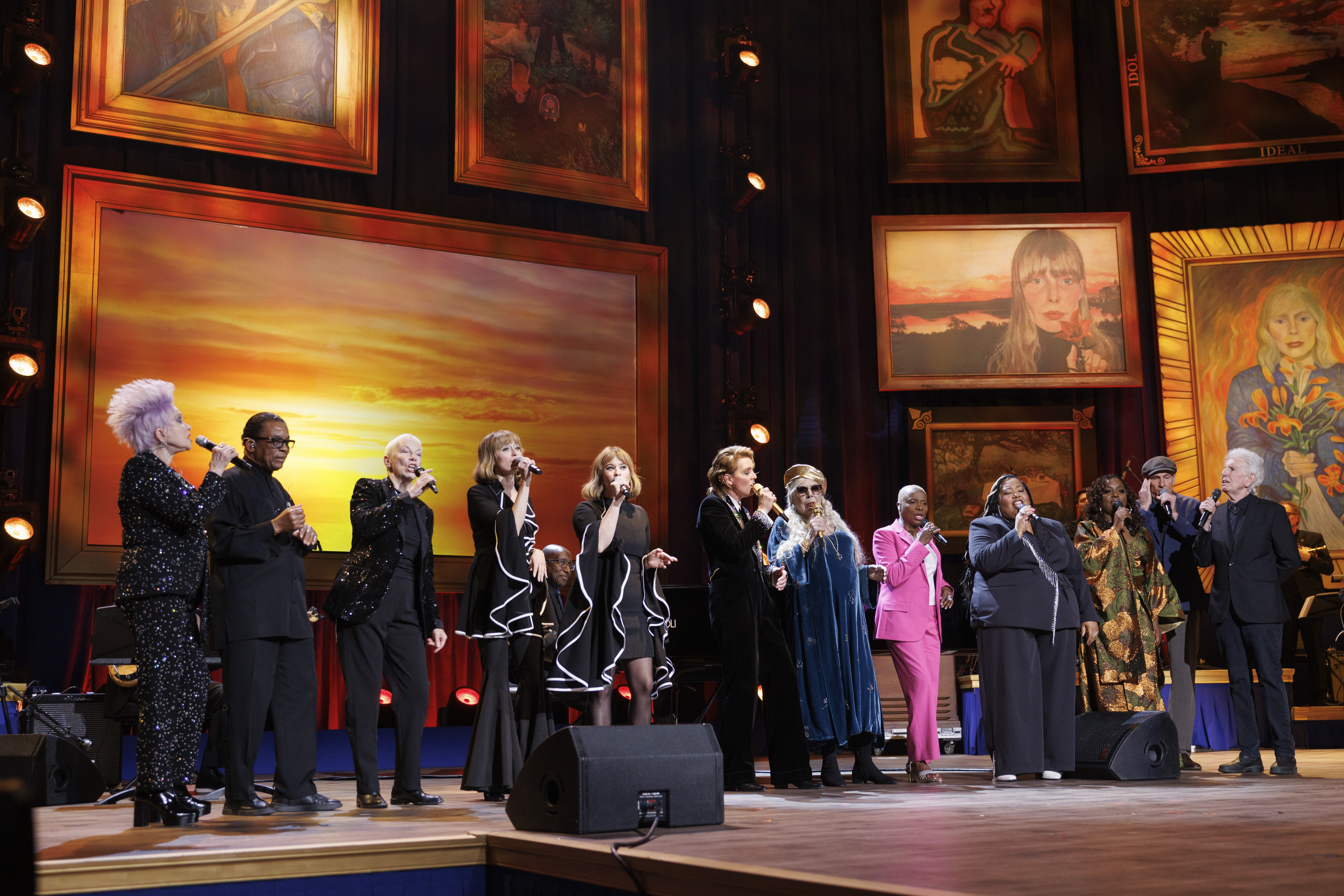
Lennox (third from left), performing at the 2023 Gershwin Prize for Popular Song concert, alongside artists including Cyndi Lauper, Brandi Carlile and Joni Mitchell

Artists who have admired and/or cited Lennox as an influence on their career include Adele, Sophie Ellis Bextor, Taylor Swift, Darren Hayes, Zee Machine, Nelly Furtado, Jessie Ware and Melanie C. OMD frontman Andy McCluskey praised her "amazing, androgynous look", noting that it was "a bit scary" in the early 1980s.

== Personal life ==
=== Relationships ===
Lennox and Dave Stewart were in a relationship for three years in the late 1970s, before they formed Eurythmics. She has since been married three times.

Her first marriage, from 1984 to 1985, was to German Hare Krishna devotee Radha Raman. From 1988 to 2000, Lennox was married to Israeli film and record producer Uri Fruchtmann and they lived in The Grove, Highgate. The couple have two daughters, Lola and Tali. A son, Daniel, was stillborn in 1988.

While fundraising in 2009, Lennox met Mitch Besser, who had started an AIDS charity in Africa. Besser's wife had divorce proceedings brought against him, in April 2012. On 15 September 2012, Lennox married Besser at a private ceremony in London. He is the brother of medical doctor/executive Richard E. Besser.

=== Views ===
Lennox is agnostic and a feminist. Lennox became a vegetarian at age 29.

=== Health ===
Lennox was diagnosed with ADHD at 70 years old.

=== Wealth ===
In the 2010 Sunday Times Rich List of British millionaires from the world of music, Lennox was estimated to have a fortune of £30 million.

== Awards and nominations ==
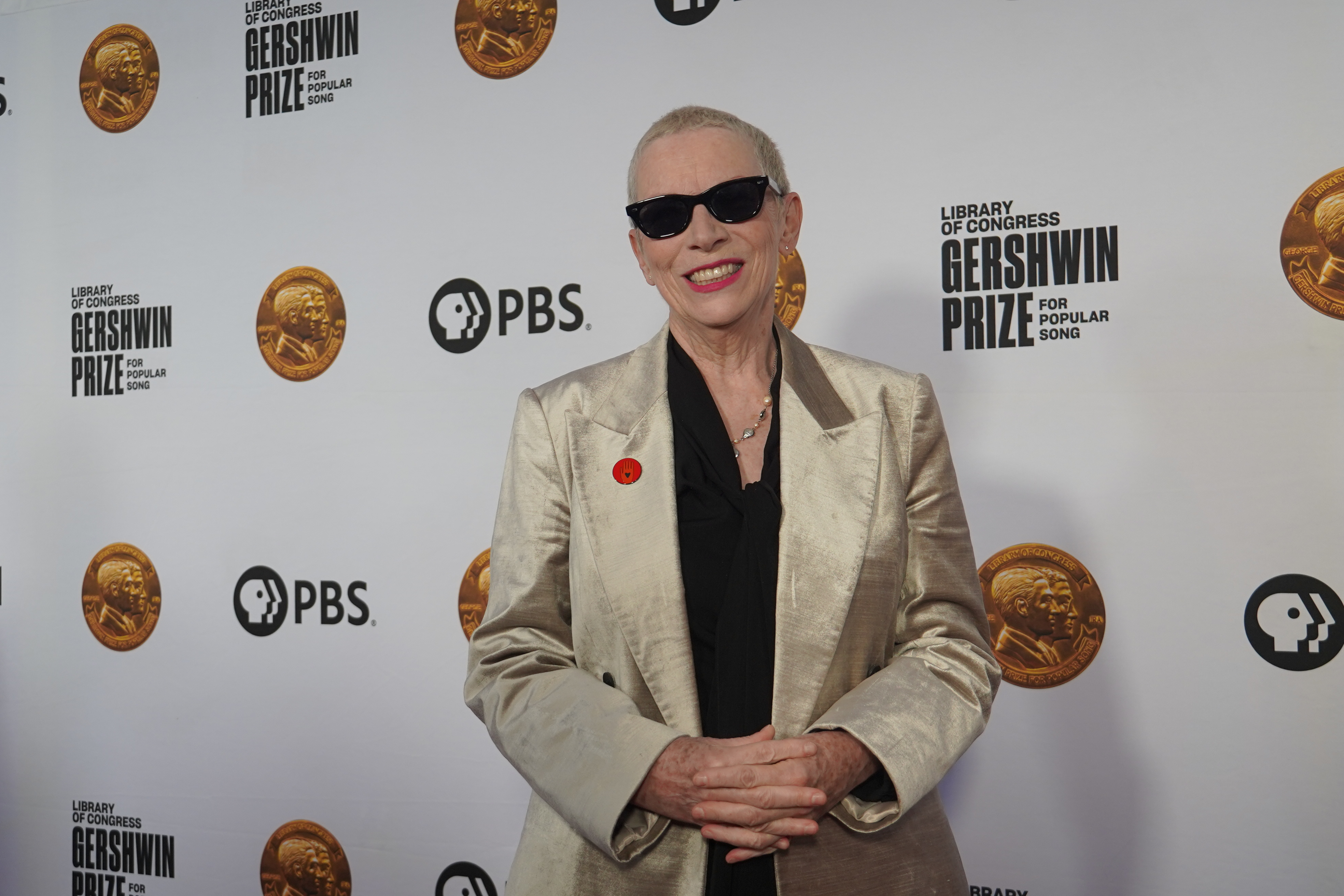
Lennox at the 2024 Library of Congress Gershwin Prize ceremony

She has been named "The Greatest White Soul Singer Alive" by VH1 and one of the 100 greatest singers of all time by Rolling Stone. In 2012, she was rated No. 22 on VH1's 100 Greatest Women in Music. In June 2013 the Official Charts Company called her "the most successful female British artist in UK music history". As of June 2008, including her work with Eurythmics, Lennox had sold over 80 million records worldwide. As part of a one-hour symphony of British Music, Lennox performed "Little Bird" during the 2012 Summer Olympics closing ceremony in London. At the 2015 Ivor Novello Awards Lennox was made a fellow of the British Academy of Songwriters, Composers and Authors (The Ivors Academy), the first woman to receive the honour. Lennox was also made a Fellow of the Royal Scottish Academy of Music and Drama. Lennox and her Eurythmics partner Dave Stewart were inducted into the Songwriters Hall of Fame in 2020, and the duo were inducted into the Rock and Roll Hall of Fame in 2022.

Lennox has received a variety of major awards during her career: With eight Brit Awards, which includes being named Best British Female Artist a record six times, Lennox has been named the "Brits Champion of Champions". She has also collected four Grammy Awards and an MTV Video Music Award. In 2002, Lennox received a Billboard Century Award; the highest accolade from Billboard. In 2004, she received the Golden Globe and the Academy Award for Best Original Song for "Into the West", written for the soundtrack to the feature film The Lord of the Rings: The Return of the King.

As a member of Eurythmics, Lennox's accolades include the MTV Video Music Award for Best New Artist in 1984, the Grammy Award for Best Rock Performance by a Duo or Group with Vocal in 1987, and the Brit Award for Outstanding Contribution to Music in 1999. They were inducted into the UK Music Hall of Fame in 2005, the Songwriters Hall of Fame in 2020, and the Rock and Roll Hall of Fame in 2022.

== Discography and bibliography ==
- Diva (1992)
- Medusa (1995)
- Bare (2003)
- Songs of Mass Destruction (2007)
- A Christmas Cornucopia (2010)
- Nostalgia (2014)

=== Books ===
- Annie, Lennox (23 September 2025). Retrospective: Annie Lennox (1st hardcover ed.). New York: Rizzoli International Publications. ISBN 978-0847875559. OCLC 1509164150.

== See also ==
- List of British Grammy Award winners and nominees

Academic offices
Preceded by Muhammad Yunus	Chancellor of Glasgow Caledonian University; 2018–2023	Succeeded by Anne-Marie Imafidon
