= Little Bird (Annie Lennox song) =

1993 single by Annie Lennox

Single by Annie Lennox

from the album Diva
- A-side: "Love Song for a Vampire"
- Released: 1 February 1993
- Studio: Mayfair, The Church (London, England)
- Genre: Dance; pop rock
- Length: 4:52 (album version); 4:38 (U.S. album version); 4:37 (single mix)
- Label: RCA; BMG
- Songwriter: Annie Lennox
- Producer: Stephen Lipson

Annie Lennox singles chronology
| "Cold" (1992) | "Little Bird" / "Love Song for a Vampire" (1993) | "No More 'I Love You's'" (1995) |

Music video
- "Little Bird" on YouTube

"Little Bird" is a song composed and recorded by Scottish singer-songwriter Annie Lennox. Taken from her debut solo album, Diva (1992), it was produced by Stephen Lipson and released in February 1993 by RCA and BMG as a double A-side with "Love Song for a Vampire" (which appeared on the soundtrack for the Francis Ford Coppola film Bram Stoker's Dracula) in Ireland, the United Kingdom, and various other European countries. In other territories, "Little Bird" was released as a standalone single.

Lennox performed "Little Bird" during the 2012 Summer Olympics closing ceremony in London on 12 August 2012. A live version was played in the end credits to The Sopranos episode "Eloise". The song was also featured in the film Striptease, where Demi Moore dances to it. The music video for "Little Bird", directed by Sophie Muller, features Lennox performing with eight Lennox lookalikes. It does not appear on the video album for Diva, but is heard instrumentally over the end credits.

== Background ==
Lennox wrote "Little Bird" during the songwriting sessions for her debut solo album Diva, which was released in 1992. Produced by Stephen Lipson, it has been described as an "up-tempo dance song", and was praised by critics for being "sensitively written" and "brilliantly produced", with emphasis being placed on the song’s ability to express emotions that a considerable amount of listeners could relate to. Lyrically, "Little Bird" focuses on Lennox and her "saying goodbye" to one chapter in her life before beginning another chapter, a songwriting style which was credited as being a "story of recovery and self-empowerment".

The song features a number of contrasts – at the commencement of the song, Lennox claims to be watching a little bird flying across the sky, singing the "clearest melody", while in contrast, Lennox claims to be "dark with rage and fear" as she walks through city streets. Jo Foster has described "Little Bird" as being "one of the best dance tracks of the 1990s decade". A number of remix versions of the song have been created since its initial release. In 2022, The Guardian ranked "Little Bird" as the 7th best Annie Lennox song of all time.

"Little Bird" was released as a double A–side alongside "Love Song for a Vampire" which was featured on the soundtrack for Bram Stoker's Dracula which was released to cinema in 1992. In 1994, it was nominated for an Ivor Novello Award in the Most Performed Work category.

== Critical reception ==
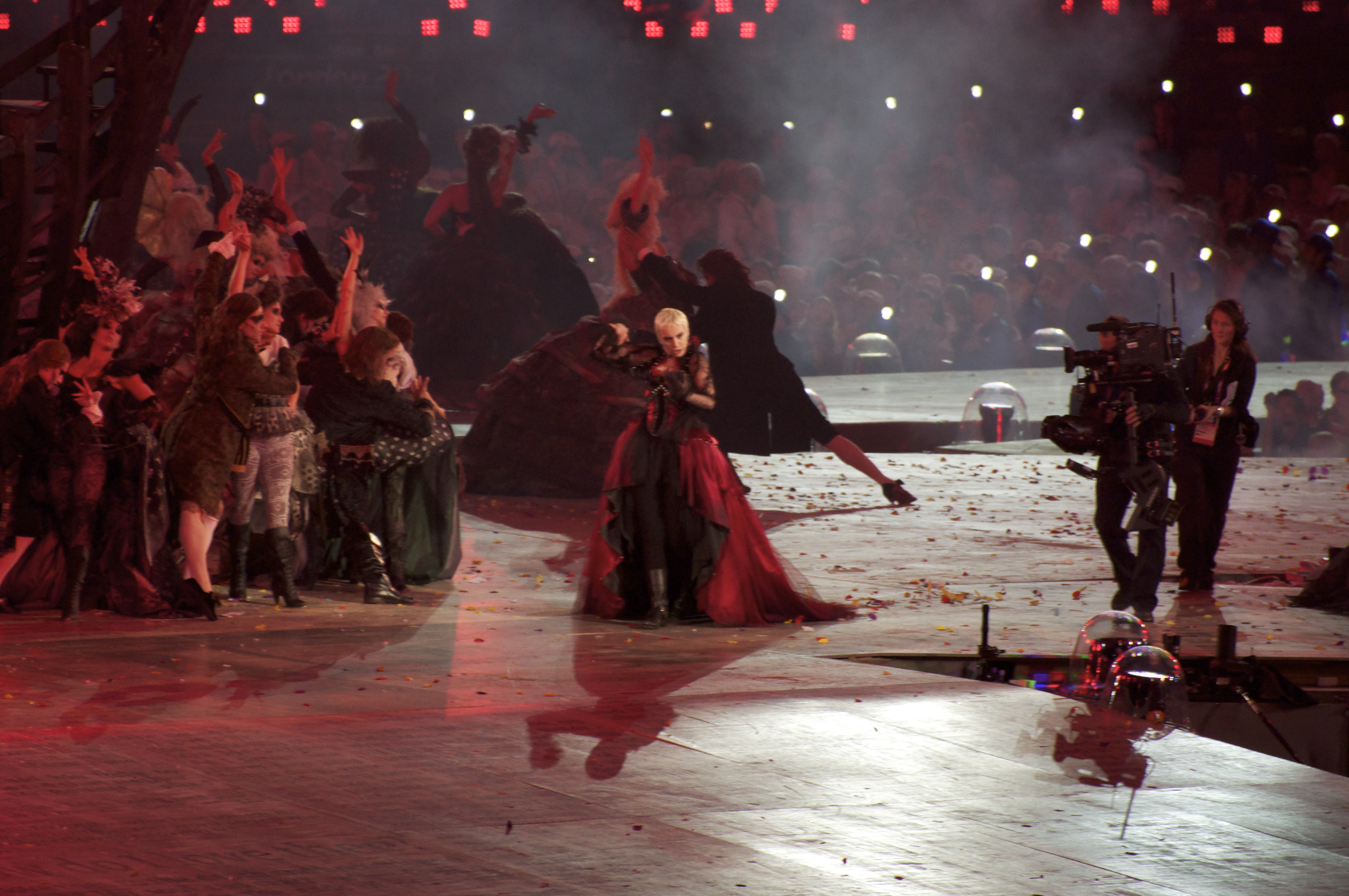
Lennox performing "Little Bird" at the 2012 Summer Olympics closing ceremony

Swedish Aftonbladet wrote that "Little Bird" is based on "a vibrant sight loop not quite unlike many old Eurythmics songs". Larry Flick from Billboard magazine described it as "a synth-driven thumper that harks back to her early Eurythmics tenure. Icy cool instrumentation is contrasted by a passionate vocal and an elastic bass line". He also complimented the song as "adventurous". Randy Clark from Cash Box named it a "beat-laden pop/rock ditty", adding, "although slightly less artsy musically than the first two singles, 'Little Bird' has wings of its own." Dave Sholin from the Gavin Report found that Lennox' "hit streak is about to carryover into 1993 on the wings of a sensitively written and brilliantly produced song that expresses what many people feel from time to time. All that, and it's uptempo!"

Matthew Cole from Music Week's RM Dance Update called it a "luscious tune". Another RM editor, James Hamilton, described it as a "perky strutter" in his weekly dance column. Alec Foege from Spin named it the album's "finest track", saying "Its call-and-response woo-woos exude genuine confidence, cleverness, and craft." Richard Riccio from St. Petersburg Times declared it as "an obvious hit with a menacing beat and infectious vocal hook. Although quite similar rhythmically to the early Eurythmics' hit 'Love Is a Stranger', there's more soul than detachment here, and Lennox hoots and hollers during the chorus, pulling you into the fun." Craig S. Semon from Telegram & Gazette described it as "punchy" and "bittersweet", adding that "Lennox's vocals soar as she fantasizes about being a free-flying, cheerful bird. The song's pain comes from Lennox realizing that such freedom and happiness are unattainable for her."

In a 2009 review, Mike Ragogna from HuffPost wrote that in the song, "Lennox observes the creature's freedom as it glides across the sky. Though the song starts out with self-doubt, she concludes, ...this little bird's fallen out of that nest now...so I've just got to put these wings to test, and both she and the collection soar from that point on." In a 2015 review, Pop Rescue noted that it "has a wonderful electro-pop feel to it – the beat and swirling synth helps the song grow wonderfully as Annie sings over the top."

== Chart performance ==
"Little Bird" / "Love Song for a Vampire" was successful on the charts on several continents, peaking at number one on both the RPM Dance chart in Canada and the Billboard Dance Club Play chart in the US. In Europe, it entered the top 10 in Italy, Ireland, Portugal, Spain and the United Kingdom, as well as on the Eurochart Hot 100, where it reached number five in March 1993. In the UK, the single peaked at number three during its first week on the UK Singles Chart, on 7 February 1993. It stayed for four weeks at that position and spent a total of 12 consecutive weeks within the UK top 100. On the Music Week Dance Singles chart, the song peaked at number two. Additionally, "Little Bird" was a top-30 hit in Germany and Iceland and a top-40 hit in Switzerland. In North America, it also peaked at numbers 49 and 50 on the Billboard Hot 100 and Cash Box Top 100, respectively, in the US, as well as number seven on the RPM 100 Hit Tracks chart in Canada. In West Asia, it became a top-five hit in Israel, peaking at number five on 16 March 1993.

"Little Bird" earned a silver record in the UK, after 200,000 singles were sold. In 2012, after Lennox performed the song during the 2012 Summer Olympics closing ceremony, it charted as a solo single for the first time, reaching number 96 on the UK Singles Chart. Additionally, following her performance at the 2012 Olympics, it reached ninety-six on the United Kingdom Singles Downloads Charts.

== Music video ==
Lennox with the various personas from her career in the music video

The accompanying music video for "Little Bird" was directed by British director Sophie Muller and features eight Lennox lookalikes dressed as the many different personas that Lennox has used in her videos (both solo and as part of Eurythmics) over the past decade, with Lennox herself in a Cabaret-esque setting acting as ringmaster. Gradually, the personas begin to squabble for the spotlight, pushing aside one another and Lennox herself as she fights to maintain control.

The music videos referenced by the personas include:

- "Sweet Dreams (Are Made of This)"
- "There Must Be an Angel (Playing with My Heart)"
- "Thorn in My Side"
- "Beethoven (I Love to Listen To)"
- "I Need a Man"
- "Why"
- "Walking on Broken Glass"
- The Freddie Mercury Tribute Concert

Lennox was in late stages of pregnancy with her second daughter Tali during the filming of the video. The "ringmaster" persona, played by Lennox, wears a black dress designed to give the illusion of being close-fitting, with a fully sequinned front and a flowing matte back panel that together partially conceal her baby bump.

== Track listings ==
All tracks were written by Annie Lennox unless otherwise noted.

CD – Arista (US)

| No. | Title | Writer(s) | Length |
|---|---|---|---|
| 1. | "Little Bird" (Edit) | | 4:32 |
| 2. | "Love Song for a Vampire" (from Bram Stoker's Dracula) | | 4:16 |
| 3. | "Why" | | 5:04 |
| 4. | "The Gift" | Lennox/Buchanan, Bell, Moore | 4:36* |
| 5. | "You Have Placed a Chill in My Heart" | Lennox/Stewart | 4:06* |

- The final three tracks were recorded live for MTV Unplugged at the Montreux Jazz Festival in Montreux, Switzerland, 3 July 1992.

CD – BMG (UK)

| No. | Title | Length |
|---|---|---|
| 1. | "Little Bird" | 4:39 |
| 2. | "Love Song for a Vampire" (from Bram Stoker's Dracula) | 4:17 |
| 3. | "Little Bird" (Utah Saints Version) | 6:35 |
| 4. | "Little Bird" (N-Joi Version) | 4:46 |

12-inch – Arista (US)

| No. | Title | Length |
|---|---|---|
| 1. | "Little Bird" (House of Gypsies Version) | 6:59 |
| 2. | "Little Bird" (House of Gypsies Radio Version) | 4:18 |
| 3. | "Little Bird" (House of Annie Version) | 4:19 |
| 4. | "Little Bird" (Single Version) | 4:32 |
| 5. | "Little Bird" (Utah Saints Version) | 6:38 |
| 6. | "Little Bird" (N-Joi Version) | 4:52 |

- House of Gypsies mixes by Todd Terry

== Charts ==
=== Weekly charts ===
| Chart (1993–2012) | Peak position |
|---|---|
| Australia (ARIA) | 38 |
| Canada Top Singles (RPM) | 7 |
| Canada Dance/Urban (RPM) | 1 |
| Europe (Eurochart Hot 100) | 5 |
| Europe (European Hit Radio) | 12 |
| Germany (GfK) | 29 |
| Iceland (Íslenski Listinn Topp 40) | 27 |
| Ireland (IRMA) with "Love Song for a Vampire" | 3 |
| Israel (Israeli Singles Chart) | 5 |
| Italy (Musica e dischi) | 8 |
| New Zealand (Recorded Music NZ) | 33 |
| Portugal (AFP) | 6 |
| Switzerland (Schweizer Hitparade) | 34 |
| UK Singles (Official Charts) | 96 |
| UK Singles (Official Charts) with "Love Song for a Vampire" | 3 |
| UK Airplay (Music Week) | 10 |
| UK Dance (Music Week) with "Love Song for a Vampire" | 2 |
| UK Club Chart (Music Week) | 9 |
| US Billboard Hot 100 | 49 |
| US Dance Club Songs (Billboard) | 1 |
| US Dance Singles Sales (Billboard) | 9 |
| US Pop Airplay (Billboard) | 36 |
| US Cash Box Top 100 | 50 |

=== Year-end charts ===
| Chart (1993) | Position |
|---|---|
| Canada Top Singles (RPM) | 49 |
| Canada Dance/Urban (RPM) | 8 |
| Europe (Eurochart Hot 100) | 39 |
| UK Singles (OCC) | 26 |
| UK Airplay (Music Week) | 39 |
| US Dance Club Play (Billboard) | 37 |

== Certifications and sales ==
| Region | Certification | Certified units/sales |
|---|---|---|
| United Kingdom (BPI) | Silver | 200,000^{^} |
^{^} Shipments figures based on certification alone.

== Release history ==
| Region | Date | Format(s) | Label(s) | Ref. |
|---|---|---|---|---|
| United Kingdom | 1 February 1993 | 7-inch vinyl; 12-inch vinyl; CD; cassette | RCA; BMG | |
| Australia | 21 February 1993 | 12-inch vinyl; CD; cassette | RCA; BMG | |

== See also ==
- List of number-one dance singles of 1993 (U.S.)
- List of RPM number-one dance singles of 1993
