= Cold (Annie Lennox song) =

1992 single by Annie Lennox

Single by Annie Lennox

from the album Diva
- Released: 19 October 1992
- Studio: Mayfair, The Church (London, England)
- Length: 4:20
- Label: RCA
- Songwriter: Annie Lennox
- Producer: Stephen Lipson

Annie Lennox singles chronology
"Walking on Broken Glass" (1992)	"Cold" (1992)	"Little Bird" / "Love Song for a Vampire" (1993)

Music video
- "Cold" on YouTube

"Cold" is a song by Scottish singer Annie Lennox, released in October 1992 by RCA Records as the fourth single from her debut solo album, Diva (1992). Written by Lennox, produced by Stephen Lipson and recorded at Mayfair Studios, it reached No. 26 on the UK Singles Chart. The single was released as a series of three separate CD singles, titled "Cold", "Colder" and "Coldest". Each CD features the track "Cold" as well as a collection of live tracks. It was the first single to chart in the UK top 40 without being released on vinyl. A cassette version was also released featuring the lead track and one live track from each CD. The accompanying music video was directed by British director Sophie Muller.

== Critical reception ==
Stephanie Zacharek from Entertainment Weekly called the song "comfortable", "with the gospel and blues touches on". A reviewer from Kingston Informer praised it as "brilliant". Robbert Tilli from Music & Media described it as "nicely waltzing". Music Week named it Pick of the Week, declaring it as a "torchy and simple ballad, offering further evidence of the quality of Annie's album Diva." In a retrospective review, Pop Rescue noted that it "feels like a slow late night jazz club number", adding that Lennox' vocals "are soft but rich here and it really shows her off perfectly." The reviewer also felt that "at times, its downbeat sound feels a little reminiscent" of lead single "Why".

Harry Dean from Smash Hits complimented the song as "pleasantly melodic". Craig S. Semon from Telegram & Gazette wrote, "'Cold' lives up to its name. This moody showpiece has a sparse keyboard arrangement that comes in like sheets of ice, with Lennox's unsettling voice as harsh as an arctic frost. It also has some of Lennox's best images and phrasing expressing heartache and regrets. During the song's most telling moment, she explains, "Dying is easy, it's living that scares me to death/I could be so content hearing the sound of your breath"."

== Track listings ==
Cold
No.	Title	Length
1.	"Cold"	4:25
2.	"Why"	5:06
3.	"The Gift"	4:43
4.	"Walking on Broken Glass"	4:01

All tracks except "Cold" were recorded acoustically live for MTV Unplugged in July 1992. All live songs were versions of songs from Diva.

Colder
No.	Title	Length
1.	"Cold"	4:25
2.	"It's Alright (Baby's Coming Back)"	4:15
3.	"Here Comes The Rain Again"	4:30
4.	"You Have Placed a Chill in My Heart"	4:19

All tracks except "Cold" were recorded acoustically live for MTV Unplugged in July 1992. All live songs were versions of songs Lennox has recorded with the Eurythmics.

Coldest
No.	Title	Length
1.	"Cold"	4:25
2.	"River Deep, Mountain High"	3:41
3.	"Feel The Need"	2:56
4.	"Don't Let Me Down"	3:26

All tracks except "Cold" were recorded acoustically live for MTV Unplugged in July 1992. All live songs were cover versions. "River Deep, Mountain High" was originally done by Ike & Tina Turner. "Feel the Need" was by The Detroit Emeralds. "Don't Let Me Down" is a Beatles song.

Cassette
No.	Title	Length
1.	"Cold"	4:25
2.	"River Deep, Mountain High"	3:41
3.	"You Have Placed a Chill in My Heart"	4:19
4.	"Why"	5:06

== Charts ==
Chart (1992)	Peak position
Australia (ARIA)	80
Belgium (Ultratop 50 Flanders)	46
Europe (Eurochart Hot 100)	48
Netherlands (Dutch Top 40 Tipparade)	18
Netherlands (Single Top 100)	51
UK Singles (Official Charts)	26
UK Airplay (Music Week)	14

== Release history ==
Region	Date	Format(s)	Label(s)	Ref.
United Kingdom	19 October 1992	—N/a	RCA	
Japan	21 January 1993	3× CD box set	RCA	
Australia	10 May 1993	CD; cassette	RCA	
