= Step by Step (Annie Lennox song) =

Annie Lennox song popularized by Whitney Houston

Song by Annie Lennox

from the album Diva (Japanese Edition)
- A-side: "Precious"
- Released: 25 May 1992
- Studio: Mayfair (London, England); The Church (London, England)
- Genre: Pop
- Length: 4:46
- Label: RCA
- Songwriter: Annie Lennox

"Step by Step"
- Front cover, other versions have a different picture

Single by Whitney Houston

from the album The Preacher's Wife: Original Soundtrack Album
- Released: December 30, 1996
- Recorded: 1996
- Studio: The Aquarium (London, UK); Crossway Studios (Mendham, NJ)
- Genre: Disco; dance; gospel
- Length: 4:10
- Label: Arista
- Songwriter: Annie Lennox
- Producer: Stephen Lipson

Whitney Houston singles chronology
"I Believe in You and Me" (1996)	"Step by Step" (1996)	"My Heart Is Calling" (1997)

Music video
- "Step by Step" on YouTube

"Step by Step" is a song recorded by Whitney Houston, originally written and recorded by Scottish singer Annie Lennox. The song appeared on the B-side to Lennox's 1992 single "Precious". Whitney Houston released a reworked crossover R&B/pop cover version in 1996 on the soundtrack to the film The Preacher's Wife. Houston's version replaces Lennox's verses with new lyrics and omits portions of the bridge. Annie Lennox provides backing vocals for Houston's rendition. The accompanying music video was directed by Paul Hunter.

== Background ==
According to Houston, Lennox sent her the song with the intention that Houston would record her own version. In an interview with The Nation, Houston recalled that Lennox had sent her "this really beautiful, spiritual song," which she felt suited the overall sound of the material intended for inclusion on the The Preacher's Wife soundtrack. Stephen Lipson, who had produced Lennox's original recording, also produced Houston's version for the soundtrack. Lipson later recalled difficulties during the recording sessions, stating that Houston arrived two and a half weeks late, had not learned the song, and initially refused to record it after her then-husband Bobby Brown objected to it. He described the production as a "complete nightmare," but also acknowledged the song's subsequent commercial success.

== Critical reception ==
J. D. Considine of The Baltimore Sun described 'Step by Step' as "a slick, synth-driven number that recalls the '80s-style sparkle of her early hits", and "certain to spend many weeks in the Top 10". Larry Flick from Billboard magazine named it "one of the shining moments" on The Preacher's Wife soundtrack. He also called it "a rousing, gospel-kissed chugger", adding that "[i]t's been too long since Houston has cut loose on an uptempo number, and she whips through this jam with engaging ease". In its review for the dance single for 'Step by Step', the magazine deemed it an "uplifting anthem", in which "Houston cuts loose with stirring gospel fervor". Chris Willman from Entertainment Weekly said in his soundtrack review, "Best among the non-gospel fare, [...] [is] 'Step by Step', a house throbber penned by Annie Lennox, represents an admirable departure but gets tripped up by a pallid Inspirations R Us lyric and perhaps too much of its author's stamp."

Howard Cohen from the Miami Herald described it as a "punchy dance/pop number", adding that its "bass-rumbling remix seems a natural for clubs". A reviewer from Music Week gave it five out of five, writing, "Tight production, a strong pop song written by Annie Lennox and a thumping groove all single this out as a smash hit for the Christmas party market. It's Houston's best work for ages." While reviewing The Preacher's Wife album, Cary Darling of the Orange County Register said that Houston "turns in a credible, danceable take" on the Lennox song, adding that the Teddy Riley remix "digs a deep new jack groove." Bob Waliszewski of Plugged In (publication) called it "aerobically upbeat", noting that the song "embraces the challenges of living day by day".

== Chart performance ==
After its release, "Step by Step" reached number 15 on the Billboard Hot 100 singles chart in the US, becoming her 24th consecutive top 40 hit in the country as a leading artist. (Note: Her featured duets with Teddy Pendergrass and Aretha Franklin were excluded from the list.) Houston's single charted successfully across the globe, reaching the Top 20 in over 45 countries. It was certified Gold by the Recording Industry Association of America. It was also successful in Europe and peaked within the top ten in Austria, the Czech Republic, Denmark, Germany, Hungary, Scotland and Spain. And it also peaked at number ten on the composite European Hot 100. In the United Kingdom, the song was released in late 1996 as the first single from The Preacher's Wife soundtrack. It peaked at number thirteen and was certified silver by the British Phonographic Industry. In February 2012, after Houston's passing, it re-entered the UK singles chart at number 83. As of 2012, the song had sold 235,000 copies in the United Kingdom. In Australia, it peaked at number 12 and spent 15 weeks on the chart. It was certified gold by the Australian Recording Industry Association. In Austria it peaked at number six and spent 16 weeks on the chart.

== Music video ==
A music video was produced to promote the single, directed by American film director, screenwriter, and music video director Paul Hunter. It shows mainly Houston wearing a brown raincoat and dancing to the song on a center stage while other dancers join her as the song develops. Houston's footages are intercut with scenes of a youth center, being restored by youngsters after a fire. The video for "Step by Step" was later published on Houston's official YouTube channel in October 2009. It has amassed more than 66 million views as of February 2026.

== Live performances ==
After its release, "Step by Step" has been performed on all of Houston's tours: Pacific Rim Tour (1997), The European Tour (1998), My Love Is Your Love World Tour (1999), Soul Divas Tour (2004) and Nothing but Love World Tour (2009–2010). It was also performed in her HBO special Classic Whitney Live from Washington, D.C. in 1997.

== Legacy ==
Following Houston's death in 2012, Entertainment Weekly published a list of her 25 best songs and ranked 'Step by Step' number 13, explaining, "The Preacher's Wife wasn't a masterpiece, but for gospel lovers, its soundtrack was [...] [a]nd its Annie Lennox-penned second single – an ode to not biting off more than you can chew, set to a churchy dance beat – peaked at a respectable No. 15 on the pop charts." It was placed at number five on Idolators list of "Whitney Houston’s 10 Best Songs That Radio Forgot" because the song "teaches us that we can overcome any obstacle". BET placed it at number 22 in their list of "The 40 Best Whitney Houston Songs", adding that "she ably recalls her '80s uptempo prime with a result that's both spirit- and body-moving". In 2017, Billboard ranked 'Step by Step' number 82 in their list of "The 100 Greatest Pop Songs of 1997", praising "its throbbing synths and weightless chorus" that give the song "all the dance-floor release it'd ever require."

== Track listings and formats ==
- US, CD single
1. "Step by Step" (Album Version) – 4:12
2. "Step by Step" (Teddy Riley Remix) – 4:14
- US, CD maxi-single (The Remixes)
1. "Step by Step" (Tony Moran Remix) – 10:22
2. "Step by Step" (Junior's Arena Anthem Mix) – 11:50
3. "Step by Step" (Soul Solution Diva Vocal Mix) – 9:02
4. "Step by Step" (K-Klass Remix) – 10:08
5. "Step by Step" (Teddy Riley Remix) – 5:00
6. "Step by Step" (Album Version) – 4:07
- Europe, 12" 2x vinyl maxi-single (The Remixes)

A1: "Step by Step" (Junior's Arena Anthem Mix) – 11:50
A2: "Step by Step" (Album Version) – 4:12
B1: "Step by Step" (K-Klass Remix) – 10:06
B2: "Step by Step" (Soul Solution Bonus Bass Dub) – 2:40
C1: "Step by Step" (Soul Solution Diva Vocal Mix) – 9:02
D1: "Step by Step" (Junior's Deep Vocal Mix) – 8:47
D2: "Step by Step" (Teddy Riley Remix) – 4:32

- Australia, CD single
1. "Step by Step" (Album Version) – 4:12
2. "Step by Step" (Teddy Riley Remix) – 4:32
3. "Step by Step" (Junior Vasquez Remix) – 11:50
4. "Step by Step" (Soul Solution Diva Vocal Mix) – 9:02

== Personnel ==
Credits

- Producer, mixer – Stephen Lipson
- Writer, Backing Vocals – Annie Lennox
- Vocal arrangement – Whitney Houston
- Recording engineer – Heff Moraes

Recording and mixing

- Recorded at the Aquarium Studio, London, UK and Crossway Studios, Mendham, NJ
- Mixed at the Aquarium Studio, London, UK

== Charts ==
=== Weekly charts ===
Chart (1996–1997)	Peak position
Australia (ARIA)	12
Austria (Ö3 Austria Top 40)	6
Belgium (Ultratop 50 Flanders)	13
Belgium (Ultratop 50 Wallonia)	12
Canada (Nielsen SoundScan)	10
Canada Top Singles (RPM)	23
Canada Adult Contemporary (RPM)	9
Canada Dance/Urban (RPM)	15
Canada Contemporary Hit Radio (The Record)	13
Czech Republic (IFPI CR)	2
Denmark (IFPI)	4
Estonia Airplay (Eesti Top 25)	1
Europe (European Hot 100)	10
Finland (Suomen virallinen lista)	11
France (SNEP)	30
Germany (GfK)	8
Hungary (Mahasz)	4
Iceland (Íslenski Listinn Topp 40)	19
Ireland (IRMA)	14
Israel (Israeli Singles Chart)	4
Italy (Musica e dischi)	14
Italy Airplay (Music & Media)	2
Netherlands (Dutch Top 40)	11
Netherlands (Single Top 100)	13
New Zealand (Recorded Music NZ)	46
Quebec (ADISQ)	6
Scottish Singles Sales (Official Charts)	8
Spain (AFYVE)	2
Sweden (Sverigetopplistan)	15
Switzerland (Schweizer Hitparade)	15
UK Singles (Official Charts)	13
UK Hip Hop/R&B (Official Charts)	3
UK Airplay (Music & Media)	1
UK Airplay (Music Week)	4
US Billboard Hot 100	15
US Adult Contemporary (Billboard)	12
US Dance Club Songs (Billboard)	3
US Pop Airplay (Billboard)	26
US Hot R&B/Hip-Hop Songs (Billboard)	29

=== Year-end charts ===
Chart (1997)	Position
Australia (ARIA)	67
Austria (Ö3 Austria Top 40)	30
Belgium (Ultratop 50 Wallonia)	90
Canada Adult Contemporary (RPM)	45
Europe (Eurochart Hot 100)	37
Finland (Suomen virallinen lista)	42
Germany (Media Control)	38
Netherlands (Dutch Top 40)	58
UK Singles (OCC)	99
US Hot Dance Club Play Singles (Billboard)	21

== Certifications ==
Region	Certification	Certified units/sales
Australia (ARIA)	Gold	35,000^{^}
Germany (BVMI)	Gold	250,000^{^}
United Kingdom (BPI)	Silver	200,000^{^}
United Kingdom (BPI) 2004 release	Gold	400,000^{‡}
United States (RIAA)	Gold	500,000^{^}
^{^} Shipments figures based on certification alone.^{‡} Sales+streaming figures based on certification alone.
