= Diva (Annie Lennox album) =

1992 studio album by Annie Lennox

Studio album by Annie Lennox
- Released: 6 April 1992
- Recorded: 1991–1992
- Studios: Mayfair and The Church (London)
- Genres: Pop; soul
- Length: 49:55
- Label: RCA
- Producer: Stephen Lipson

Annie Lennox chronology
Diva (1992)	Medusa (1995)

Singles from Diva
- 1. "Why" Released: 16 March 1992; 2. "Precious" Released: 25 May 1992; 3. "Walking on Broken Glass" Released: 10 August 1992; 4. "Cold" Released: 19 October 1992; 5. "Little Bird" Released: 1 February 1993

Diva is the debut solo studio album by Scottish singer Annie Lennox, released on 6 April 1992 by RCA Records. The album entered the UK Albums Chart at number one and has since sold over 1.2 million copies in the UK alone, being certified quadruple platinum. Diva was the 7th best selling album of 1992 in the United Kingdom. In the United States, it reached number 23 on the Billboard 200 and has been certified double platinum.

The album spawned five successful single releases, beginning with "Why" in March 1992, and followed by "Precious" in May, "Walking on Broken Glass" in August and "Cold" in October 1992. "Little Bird" was released in February 1993 as a double A-side with "Love Song for a Vampire", a song Lennox had recorded for the 1992 film Bram Stoker's Dracula. All five single releases reached the UK Top 30 (three of them Top 10), and achieved commercial success internationally.

Worldwide, Diva has sold over seven million copies, and won the Brit Award for British Album of the Year at the 1993 Brit Awards. The album received nominations for Album of the Year, Best Female Pop Vocal Performance and Best Long Form Music Video, winning the latter award at the Grammy Awards the same year. Diva has been described as "state-of-the-art soul pop" by Rolling Stone magazine, who also included the album in their "Essential Recordings of the '90s" list.

== Background and recording ==
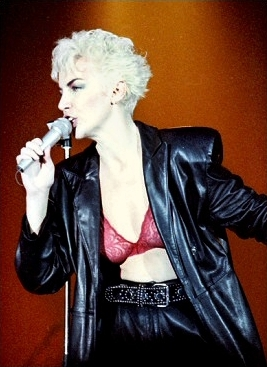
Lennox in 1986. Following the informal dissolution of Eurythmics in 1990, Lennox began working on Diva in 1991

Following the informal dissolution of Eurythmics in 1990, Lennox took some time away from the music industry, during which she gave birth to her eldest daughter. She commenced working on her first solo album in 1991 with producer Stephen Lipson. Though she had been accustomed to co-writing material with Dave Stewart during her years with Eurythmics, eight of the ten tracks on Diva were written solely by Lennox herself, with two tracks being co-written by her. In a 1992 interview with BBC, Lennox claimed she had "two years when I didn't do anything", and confirmed that during that period she was doubtful as to whether she should write and record a solo album or not. She highlighted that after much deliberation, "it all came back to you are supposed to write songs", claiming that when she writes songs "it affirms who I am", citing it being "part of her identify". Upon its release, the album debuted at number one on the UK Albums Chart and would eventually yield five hit singles, three of which reached the Top 10 (although they had continued to achieve number one albums, Eurythmics had not scored a UK Top 10 single since 1986). Diva was ultimately certified quadruple platinum in the UK, more than any of Eurythmics' studio albums.

The song "Keep Young and Beautiful" was included on the CD release as a bonus track (the original vinyl album had only ten tracks). Another bonus track, "Step by Step", appeared on the Mexican and Japanese editions of the album and was also included as the B-side on the single "Precious". The song was later recorded by Whitney Houston for the 1996 film soundtrack The Preacher's Wife and subsequently became a hit single.

The headdress worn by Lennox on the album's cover (and seen in several of the album's videos) was obtained from the London-based costume company Angels. It had been used previously in the James Bond film Octopussy. After giving birth to a stillborn son in 1988, Lennox gave birth to her eldest daughter in 1991 while she was working on Diva. The song "Money Can't Buy It" touches on the theme of motherhood, with the lyrics "I believe in the power of creation". Analysis of the lyrics would suggest that a mother's love for a child is greater than success, fame and money.

== Composition ==
Lennox in character as "the Diva" in the music video for "The Gift"

Speaking to the BBC in 1992, Lennox said that the song "Why" is "a deep dialogue with myself", stating that the song was inspired by ones lack of communication. At the end of the song, Lennox describes the ending as "a big rant", stating that she wrote that part of the song to affirm to others that she is not what she had often been portrayed by others to be. She described her writing technique for the ending of the song as a "denouncement of things that had been applied" to her up until that point in her career, further adding that she "reserves the right" to not let people know exactly who she is as a person. Lennox stated in the same interview that she wished for her creativity to be true during the writing of the album, stating, "if you are going to be creative you better be off the wall rather than sitting in the middle of it all feeling comfortable".

Lennox claimed that "Cold" was "less bitter" and "less edgy" than the likes of "Why", reflecting her frame of mind of feeling fulfilled and complete, rather than a feeling of misery, citing the "hindsight" of her experiences and seeing it positively rather than negatively. "Money Can't Buy It" was written in relation to Lennox's experience of childbirth, stating in an interview with the BBC that she would "like to have more children", saying that becoming a mother has "changed her life, and of course it's going to have some effect", further adding it has brought many "qualities back into my life that I feel I had been missing for years, that's the beauty of children". Lennox indicated that her own upbringing as an only child inspired the song, noting her wish for her daughter to have the sibling she never had. She acknowledged that "it is not like going to the supermarket and it being something you can buy; you never know how it will work out".

She said that songs she has written, both for Diva and with Eurythmics partner Dave Stewart, were "intensely personal", stating she "cannot go outside of myself and looking at other people's situations and reinterpreting them in some kind of story form". She said she "loved that kind of songwriting", but claimed it "does not apply to my own ability" and she finds it easier to "confront herself" during songwriting.

== Title ==
Lennox explained that the album's title was meant ironically. During a radio interview with BBC Radio 2, she said, "It's quite an arrogant thing to take that name and put it on yourself. It's like taking a crown and putting it on your head, in a way. But I do it with a smile because the diva that you see, the person in performance, is not necessarily the person that I am." Lennox further explained: "As a performer, I've lived that diva-esque existence. Being in a little box, and having that box opened up, night after night, when you come out and perform and everybody sees this thing, this entity, and then go back and disappear, and pack your suitcase. I've experienced that balance of being the public person that is this monstrous kind of diva, a personage, and then trying to maintain my life."

The notion of being a "diva" is a central theme throughout the album, and, as argued by Felix Rowe of Classic Pop, "understanding this notion is central to unwrapping the themes of the record, and the picture is fully realised through the accompanying visuals."

== Release and promotion ==
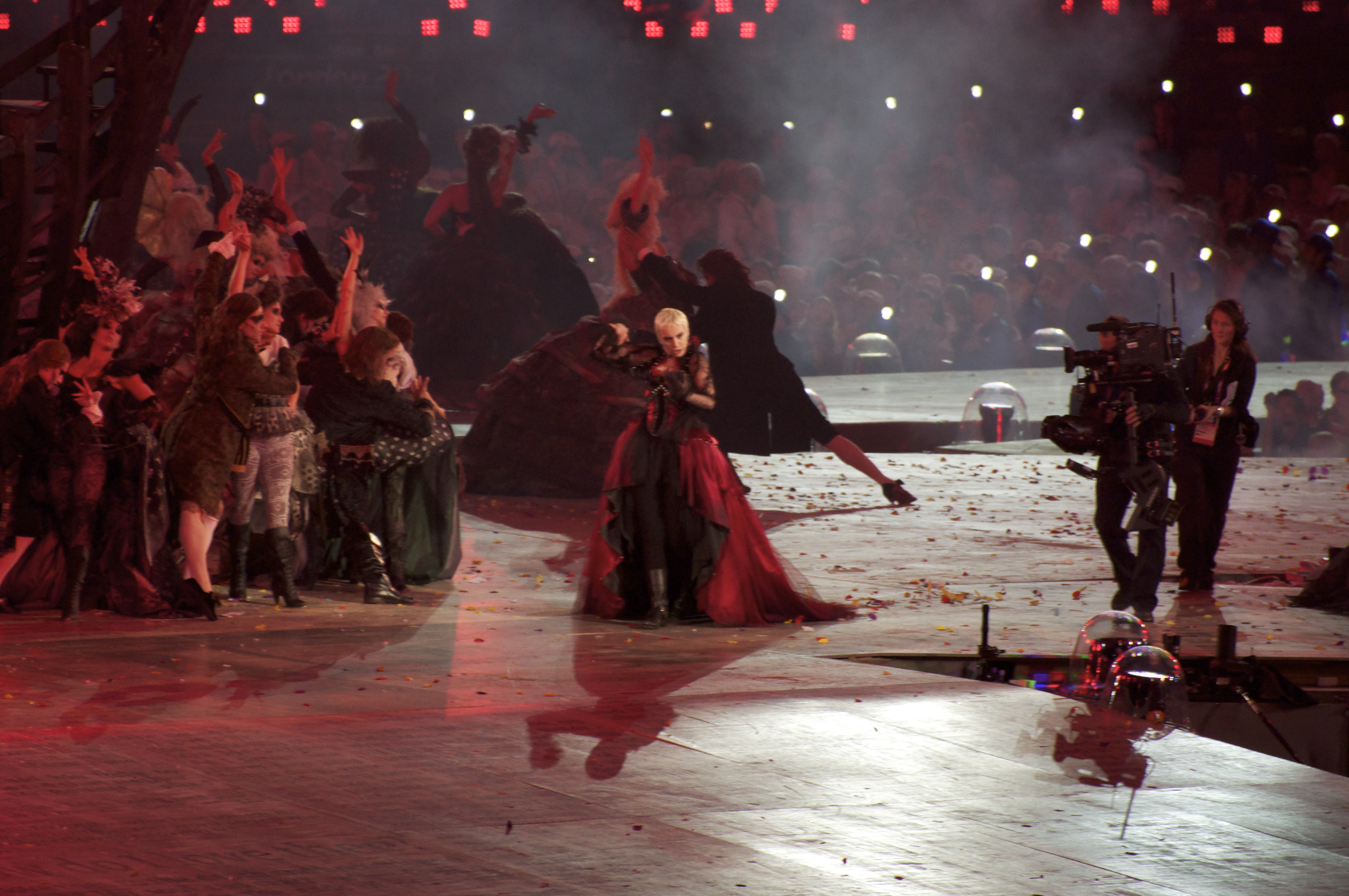
Lennox performing "Little Bird" at the 2012 Summer Olympics closing ceremony

Lennox released the lead single from Diva, "Why" on 16 March 1992. Upon release, "Why" was the most played track across European radio networks. The choice to release "Why" as the lead single and launch of Lennox's solo career was described as a "bold move" by some due to its heart wrenching nature. Lennox described "Why" as "a deep dialogue with myself in a funny way. A song about communication, or lack of communication.” Diva was released on 6 April 1992, one month after the release of "Why" as the first single. Upon release, album entered the UK Albums Chart at number one and has since sold over 1.2 million copies in the UK alone, being certified quadruple platinum. In the United States, it reached number 23 on the Billboard 200 and has been certified double platinum.

"Precious" was released as the albums second single on 25 May 1992. Described as "by far the hardest-hitting track on the album in terms of the attack of its instrumentation" by Classic Pop magazine, "Precious" is composed around a low-slung bass groove. "Walking on Broken Glass" was released as the third single from the album, and has been described by music commentators as "catchy and immediately familiar", further adding that "Walking on Broken Glass" is "the type of track that every self-respecting pop star would give anything to have in their arsenal". "Cold" followed as the fourth single on 19 October 1992, with "Little Bird" serving as the fifth and final single on 1 February 1993. "Little Bird" was issued as a double A-side with "Love Song for a Vampire", which Lennox recorded for Bram Stoker's Dracula (1992). Although not included on Diva, the latter appeared on the film's official soundtrack. In their review of the soundtrack, Billboard wrote, "The highlight and probable single is the only vocal entry on the album, Annie Lennox's haunting, romantic 'Love Song for a Vampire'."

== Critical reception ==
Professional ratings
Review scores
Source	Rating
AllMusic	4/5 stars
Chicago Sun-Times	3/4 stars
Entertainment Weekly	C
Los Angeles Times	3/4 stars
Pitchfork	8.0/10
Q	4/5 stars
Rolling Stone	3.5/5 stars
The Rolling Stone Album Guide	3.5/5 stars
Slant Magazine	4.5/5 stars
The Village Voice	C+

Diva received acclaim from critics upon release. In their review, Rolling Stone commented:

State-of-the-art soul pop, Annie Lennox's solo debut is sonically gorgeous; it also declares her aesthetic independence. Ace sessionmen polish Diva's gloss, and producer Stephen Lipson (Pet Shop Boys, Propaganda) operates in hyperdrive, but these eleven songs are fiercely those of a sister doing things for herself. Three years after her last outing with Dave Stewart, her cohort in Eurythmics, Lennox voids any notion that he was her Svengali and she merely the MTV beauty with stunning pipes. Writing nearly all of Diva, she manages a whirlwind tour of mainstream R&B and retains her singular persona – an ice queen thirsting to be melted by love.

Diva was included in Q magazine's year-end list of the "50 Best Albums of 1992". It was later included in Rolling Stone's Essential Recordings of the 90's list.

Pitchfork stated that the album is "a joyous and liberated pop album with a prophetic message about the disillusionment of fame". Slant Magazine included the album on its 2003 list of 50 Essential Pop Albums. Reviewing the record for the publication, Eric Henderson wrote that Diva "glides with a rich, feminine dignity that stands tall in pop history." He further noted that the album's relative quietude reflects "a woman in full awareness, if not complete control, of the occasional ostentation of her emotional whims."

== Track listing ==
All tracks are written by Annie Lennox, except where noted.

No.	Title	Writer(s)	Length
1.	"Why"		4:53
2.	"Walking on Broken Glass"		4:12
3.	"Precious"		5:08
4.	"Legend in My Living Room"	Lennox; Peter-John Vettese	3:45
5.	"Cold"		4:20
6.	"Money Can't Buy It"		5:00
7.	"Little Bird"		4:48
8.	"Primitive"		4:19
9.	"Stay by Me"		6:28
10.	"The Gift"	Lennox; The Blue Nile	4:52
Total length:			47:45

CD bonus track
No.	Title	Writer(s)	Length
11.	"Keep Young and Beautiful"	Al Dubin; Harry Warren	2:17
Total length:			50:02

Japanese edition bonus track
No.	Title	Length
12.	"Step by Step"	4:49
Total length:		52:34

== Video album ==
Diva

Video by Annie Lennox
- Released: 6 April 1992 (VHS); 26 September 2000 (DVD)
- Label: BMG Video
- Director: Sophie Muller

Lennox simultaneously released a video album for Diva, featuring promotional videos for seven of the album's tracks along with an excerpt of a track entitled "Remember", which has never been released elsewhere. The video album was directed by Sophie Muller, who had worked with Lennox during her later years with Eurythmics.

Later in 1992, the video album was reissued as Totally Diva, featuring two additional videos that had been made since the original release in April: "Precious" and "Walking on Broken Glass". Totally Diva was subsequently released on DVD in 2000.

The only omissions from the video album were "Little Bird" (the video for which had not yet been made at that time), and the album track "Stay by Me", for which no video was made.

=== Track listing ===
Original release
No.	Title	Length
1.	"Why"
2.	"Legend in My Living Room"
3.	"Money Can't Buy It"
4.	"Cold"
5.	"Remember" (excerpt)
6.	"Primitive"
7.	"The Gift"
8.	"Keep Young and Beautiful"

Totally Diva
No.	Title	Length
1.	"Why"
2.	"Legend in My Living Room"
3.	"Precious"
4.	"Money Can't Buy It"
5.	"Cold" / "Remember" (excerpt)
6.	"Primitive"
7.	"The Gift"
8.	"Walking on Broken Glass"
9.	"Keep Young and Beautiful"

== Personnel ==
Credits adapted from the liner notes of Diva.

=== Musicians ===
- Annie Lennox – all vocals, keyboards
- Stephen Lipson – guitars, programming, keyboards
- Peter-John Vettese – keyboards, programming, recorder
- Marius de Vries – programming, keyboards
- Luís Jardim – percussion
- Ed Shearmur – piano
- Keith LeBlanc – drums
- Doug Wimbish – bass guitar
- Kenji Suzuki – guitar
- Steve Jansen – drum programming
- Paul Moore – keyboards
- Dave DeFries – trumpet
- Gavyn Wright – violin

=== Technical ===
- Stephen Lipson – production
- Heff Moraes – engineering, MIDI management
- William O'Donovan – mixing assistance
- Ian Silvester – digital technician
- Ian Cooper – mastering

=== Artwork ===
- Laurence Stevens – sleeve designs
- Satoshi Saïkusa – photography (front cover)
- Anton Corbijn – photography

== Charts ==
=== Weekly charts ===
Weekly chart performance for Diva
Chart (1992)	Peak position
Australian Albums (ARIA)	7
Austrian Albums (Ö3 Austria)	3
Canada Top Albums/CDs (RPM)	6
Danish Albums (Hitlisten)	4
Dutch Albums (Album Top 100)	5
European Albums (Music & Media)	2
Finnish Albums (Suomen virallinen lista)	18
German Albums (Offizielle Top 100)	6
Greek Albums (IFPI)	6
Hungarian Albums (MAHASZ)	26
Irish Albums (IFPI)	3
Italian Albums (Musica e dischi)	1
Japanese Albums (Oricon)	77
New Zealand Albums (RMNZ)	6
Norwegian Albums (VG-lista)	11
Spanish Albums (AFYVE)	36
Swedish Albums (Sverigetopplistan)	5
Swiss Albums (Schweizer Hitparade)	5
UK Albums (Official Charts)	1
US Billboard 200	23

=== Year-end charts ===
1992 year-end chart performance for Diva
Chart (1992)	Position
Austrian Albums (Ö3 Austria)	36
Canada Top Albums/CDs (RPM)	27
Dutch Albums (Album Top 100)	48
European Albums (Music & Media)	12
German Albums (Offizielle Top 100)	24
New Zealand Albums (RMNZ)	36
Swiss Albums (Schweizer Hitparade)	21
UK Albums (OCC)	7
US Billboard 200	69

1993 year-end chart performance for Diva
Chart (1993)	Position
UK Albums (OCC)	35
US Billboard 200	70

== Certifications and sales ==
Certifications and sales for Diva
Region	Certification	Certified units/sales
Australia (ARIA)	Platinum	70,000^{^}
Austria (IFPI Austria)	Gold	25,000^{*}
Canada (Music Canada)	2× Platinum	200,000^{^}
Denmark (IFPI Danmark)	Platinum	20,000^{‡}
Germany (BVMI)	Gold	250,000^{^}
Ireland (IRMA)	Platinum	15,000^{^}
Italy (FIMI)	Platinum	250,000
Netherlands (NVPI)	Gold	50,000^{^}
New Zealand (RMNZ)	Platinum	15,000^{^}
Norway (IFPI Norway)	Gold	25,000^{*}
Sweden (GLF)	Platinum	100,000^{^}
Switzerland (IFPI Switzerland)	Gold	25,000^{^}
United Kingdom (BPI)	4× Platinum	1,200,000^{^}
United States (RIAA)	2× Platinum	2,700,000
Summaries
Worldwide	—	7,000,000
^{*} Sales figures based on certification alone.^{^} Shipments figures based on certification alone.^{‡} Sales+streaming figures based on certification alone.

== Awards and nominations ==
=== Brit Awards ===
Year	Nominee / work	Award	Result
1993	Diva	Best British Album	Won
1993	Annie Lennox (performer)	Best British Female Artist	Won
1993	Stephen Lipson (producer)	Best British Producer	Nominated
1993	"Walking on Broken Glass"	Best British Video	Nominated

=== Grammy Awards ===
Year	Nominee / work	Award	Result
1993	Diva	Album of the Year	Nominated
1993	Diva	Best Pop Vocal Performance - Female	Nominated
1993	Diva (Performer: Annie Lennox; Director: Sophie Muller; Producer: Rob Small)	Best Long Form Music Video	Won
