= Precious (Annie Lennox song) =

1992 single by Annie Lennox

Single by Annie Lennox

from the album Diva
- B-side: "Step by Step"
- Released: 25 May 1992
- Studio: Mayfair, The Church (London, England)
- Genre: Funk; pop rock
- Length: 5:08 (album version); 3:47 (radio edit)
- Label: RCA
- Songwriter: Annie Lennox
- Producer: Stephen Lipson

Annie Lennox singles chronology
"Why" (1992)	"Precious" (1992)	"Walking on Broken Glass" (1992)

Music video
- "Precious" on YouTube

"Precious" is a song by Scottish singer Annie Lennox, released on 25 May 1992 by RCA Records as the second single from her debut solo album, Diva (1992). Written by Lennox, produced by Stephen Lipson and recorded at Mayfair Studios, it peaked at number 23 in the UK and was a top-10 hit in Italy. The B-side, "Step by Step", was later covered by Whitney Houston for the soundtrack of her 1996 film, The Preacher's Wife, and became a top-10 hit. "Precious" is unrelated to the B-side track of the same name on the single "Revival" by Eurythmics.

== Critical reception ==
Robbert Tilli from Music & Media described "Precious" as a "Stevie Wonderesque funk-edged song". Alan Jones from Music Week named it Pick of the Week, commenting, "Not as immediate as 'Why', but a stylish little offering with few pretentions. Peppy uptempo pop/rock, and highly engaging, this is certain to keep demand for Lennox's Diva album at a high level." A reviewer from People Magazine noted the "passion" the singer brings to the song. Pop Rescue complimented its "wonderfully thick plodding bass line", adding that Lennox's vocals "are rich here, and she has the space to give some higher notes too."

Harry Dean from Smash Hits declared it as "pleasantly melodic". Craig S. Semon from Telegram & Gazette wrote, "On 'Precious', Lennox's tarnished Eurythmics' mystique and her newly found solo freedom finally fall into place. With intense vocals, she romances an angel (obviously a song to her 18-month-old daughter, Lola), while a funky program and a jazzy horn solo keep the song grooving. She effectively conveys the love she feels for her little bundle of joy, explaining how it has changed her life and replaced all her bitterness." He added, "The song is one of the album's better numbers and it has all the passion and intensity of a successful Lisa Stansfield outing".

== Track listing ==
CD single
No.	Title	Length
1.	"Precious" (radio edit)	3:51
2.	"Step by Step"	4:46
3.	"Precious" (album version)	5:07
4.	"Why"	4:53

== Charts ==
=== Weekly charts ===
Chart (1992)	Peak position
Australia (ARIA)	83
Belgium (Ultratop 50 Flanders)	27
Europe (European Hot 100 Singles)	37
Europe (European Dance Radio)	13
Germany (GfK)	49
Italy (Musica e dischi)	7
Netherlands (Dutch Top 40)	30
Netherlands (Single Top 100)	39
Sweden (Sverigetopplistan)	28
Switzerland (Schweizer Hitparade)	37
UK Singles (Official Charts)	23
UK Airplay (Music Week)	6

=== Year-end charts ===
Chart (1992)	Position
UK Airplay (Music Week)	49

== Release history ==
Region	Date	Format(s)	Label(s)	Ref.
United Kingdom	25 May 1992	7-inch vinyl; CD; cassette	RCA	
Australia	15 June 1992	CD; cassette	RCA	
Japan	22 July 1992	Mini-CD	RCA	
