= Love Song for a Vampire =

1993 single by Annie Lennox

Single by Annie Lennox

from the album Bram Stoker's Dracula: Original Motion Picture Soundtrack
- A-side: "Little Bird"
- Released: 1 February 1993
- Genre: Pop
- Length: 4:17
- Label: RCA; BMG
- Songwriter: Annie Lennox
- Producer: Stephen Lipson

Annie Lennox singles chronology
"Cold" (1992)	"Little Bird" / "Love Song for a Vampire" (1993)	"No More 'I Love You's'" (1995)

Music video
- "Love Song for a Vampire" on YouTube

"Love Song for a Vampire" is a song by Scottish singer Annie Lennox. Written by Lennox and produced by Stephen Lipson, it was recorded for Francis Ford Coppola's 1992 film, Bram Stoker's Dracula based on the 1897 gothic horror novel, where it plays during the end credits. It was released in February 1993 by RCA and BMG as a double A-side with "Little Bird" in Ireland, the United Kingdom and several other countries in Europe. "Love Song for a Vampire" received positive contemporary and retrospective reviews. The accompanying music video for the song was directed by Sophie Muller, featuring footage from Bram Stoker's Dracula.

== Background and recording ==
When Lennox was approached to contribute vocals for the Bram Stoker's Dracula soundtrack, she had claimed she had "little interest in Bram Stoker's book". Instead, Lennox had claimed that she had developed a fondness for a new series of novels including The Vampire Chronicles, by Anne Rice. Rice published the first installment, Interview with the Vampire, in 1976, and its sequel in 1985, The Vampire Lestat. Lennox and Rice were also united in tragedy, with Rice's daughter Michele dying of leukemia at age six, before she began writing Interview With The Vampire. In 1988, Lennox's son Daniel was stillborn, a trauma that later drove Annie to become a campaigner for women's healthcare, and ultimately united Lennox and Rice, leading to Lennox contributing vocals to "Love Song for a Vampire".

It is claimed that the trauma and emotion faced by Rice and Lennox contribute to the tender heart of "Love Song for a Vampire". The song is described as "a vulnerable song about loss, and the feeling of a grief that might go on forever".

== Release and legacy ==
In the United Kingdom, the song achieved more commercial success than the double-A sided single with Lennox's track "Little Bird" from her album Diva. It reached number three on the UK Singles Chart in early 1993, while in the US, it reached number 24 on the Billboard Modern Rock Tracks chart. It reappeared in 1995 on the UK CD single "A Whiter Shade of Pale", alongside Lennox's covers of the Psychedelic Furs' "Heaven" and Blondie's "(I'm Always Touched by Your) Presence, Dear".

== Critical reception ==
In their review of the soundtrack for Bram Stoker's Dracula, Billboard wrote, "The highlight and probable single is the only vocal entry on the album, Annie Lennox's haunting, romantic 'Love Song for a Vampire'." Mike Ragogna from HuffPost noted that in the song, "Lennox sings the poem, Once I had the rarest rose that ever deigned to bloom, cruel winter chilled the bud and stole my flower too soon, slyly transporting us from Bram Stoker's world to that of Anne Rice's without our realizing." In his weekly UK chart commentary, James Masterton declared it as a "gorgeous contribution" to the movie. Alan Jones from Music Week named it Pick of the Week, describing it as "a simple, mournful, relentless and (appropriately?) haunting song."

In 2022, The Guardian ranked "Love Songs for a Vampire" as Lennox's second-best song of all time, behind only the Eurythmics's "Love Is a Stranger" (1982). Their decision was based on what they described as her "finest solo single which features a high-drama, suitably gothic confection of ambient synths and booming drums supporting a gorgeous". Additionally, they described the song as a "faintly folk melody with lyrics that function as a straightforward love song when taken out of its cinematic context".

== Commercial performance ==
The single achieved considerable commercial success internationally, peaking at number three in the United Kingdom and the Republic of Ireland. Additionally, "Love Song for a Vampire" by itself reached number four in Spain and number ten in France. In the United States, it reached number twenty-four on the Billboard Alternative Airplay charts. Alongside "Little Bird", it was certified Silver by the British Phonographic Industry (BPI) in the United Kingdom on 1 March 1993, indicating sales in excess of 200,000 copies.

== Music video ==
The music video for "Love Song for a Vampire" was directed by British director Sophie Muller. It features Lennox, seen in a dark garden at night very similar to Lucy Westenra's in the film, and wearing a similar white dress. As she sings, several excerpts from the film are shown, and the video ends as what appears to be holy light shines upon her, very similar to what happens during Dracula's death at the film's end. David Sinclair from Rolling Stone complimented it as an "extraordinary video", and "a striking display of sinister melancholia by Lennox intercut with a tour de force of special culled from the movie."

== Track listings ==
All tracks were written by Annie Lennox unless otherwise noted.

CD: Arista / 07822 12522 2 (US)

No.	Title	Writer(s)	Length
1.	"Little Bird" (Edit)		4:32
2.	"Love Song for a Vampire" (from Bram Stoker's Dracula)		4:16
3.	"Why"		5:04*
4.	"The Gift"	Lennox/Buchanan, Bell, Moore	4:36*
5.	"You Have Placed a Chill in My Heart"	Lennox/Stewart	4:06*

- The final three tracks were recorded live for MTV Unplugged at the Montreux Jazz Festival in Montreux, Switzerland, 3 July 1992.

CD: BMG / 74321 13383 2 (UK)

No.	Title	Length
1.	"Little Bird"	4:39
2.	"Love Song for a Vampire" (from Bram Stoker's Dracula)	4:17
3.	"Little Bird" (Utah Saints Version)	6:35
4.	"Little Bird" (N'Joi Version)	4:46

== Charts ==
=== Weekly charts ===
Chart (1993)	Peak position
Europe (Eurochart Hot 100)	5
Europe (European Hit Radio)	27
France (SNEP)	10
Ireland (IRMA)	3
Italy (Musica e dischi)	8
Portugal (AFP)	6
Spain (AFYVE)	4
Switzerland (Schweizer Hitparade)	34
UK Singles (OCC)	3
UK Airplay (Music Week)	20
US Alternative Airplay (Billboard)	24

=== Year-end charts ===
Chart (1993)	Position
Europe (Eurochart Hot 100)	39
UK Singles (OCC)	26

== Certifications ==
Region	Certification	Certified units/sales
United Kingdom (BPI)	Silver	200,000^{^}
^{^} Shipments figures based on certification alone.
