= Pacific Rim Tour =

1997 concert tour by Whitney Houston

- Tour by Whitney Houston
- Tour Book Cover
- Location: 7 Asia • 2 Oceania
- Associated album: The Preacher's Wife
- Start date: May 5, 1997
- End date: May 29, 1997
- Legs: 4
- No. of shows: 9

Whitney Houston concert chronology
- Whitney: Brunei The Royal Wedding Celebration (1996); Pacific Rim Tour (1997); The European Tour (1998)

The Pacific Rim Tour was a concert tour of arenas and stadiums by American Pop/R&B singer Whitney Houston. The tour included 9 concert dates in Japan, Taiwan, Thailand, Australia and the United States in 1997. The tour was in support of her 1996 multi-platinum album, The Preacher's Wife.

== Opening act ==
- Bobby Brown (Hawaii)

== Setlist ==
This set list is representative of the concert on May 14, 1997 at Tokyo Dome in Tokyo, Japan. It does not represent all concerts for the duration of the tour.

1. "I'm Every Woman"
2. "So Emotional"
3. "I Wanna Dance with Somebody (Who Loves Me)"
4. "All at Once" / "Saving All My Love for You" / "Greatest Love of All"
5. "Queen of the Night"
6. "Change the World" (performed by Gary Houston)
7. "My Name Is Not Susan"
8. "All the Man That I Need"
9. "A Song for You" (performed by Bobby Brown)
10. "Exhale (Shoop Shoop)"
11. "Freeway of Love"
12. "Count On Me" (with CeCe Winans) (Note: performed at select dates in Japan)
13. "I Love the Lord"
14. "I Go to the Rock"
15. "I Will Always Love You"
16. "Step by Step"
17. "Something in Common" (with Bobby Brown) (Note: performed in Taipei, Bangkok, Honolulu and select dates in Japan)

== Personnel ==
Band

- Musical director / Bass guitar / Bass synthesizer – Rickey Minor
- Keyboards – Bette Sussman
- Trumpet – Raymond Brown
- Keyboards – Wayne Linsey
- Drums – Michael Baker
- Percussion – Bashiri Johnson
- Guitars – Paul Jackson Jr.
- Saxophone, EWI – Gary Bias
- Trombone – Reginald Young
- Backing vocalists – Gary Houston, Pattie Howard, Sharlotte Gibson, Valerie Pinkston-Mayo

Dancers

- Carolyn Brown, Merlyn Mitchell, Shane Johnson, Saleema Mubaarak

Tour Management

- Manager – Tony Bulluck

Security

- Director of security – Alan Jacobs

== Shows ==
Date	City	Country	Venue
Asia
May 5, 1997	Osaka	Japan	Osaka-jō Hall
May 7, 1997	Osaka	Japan	Osaka-jō Hall
May 8, 1997	Osaka	Japan	Osaka-jō Hall
May 13, 1997	Tokyo	Japan	Tokyo Dome
May 14, 1997	Tokyo	Japan	Tokyo Dome
May 20, 1997	Bangkok	Thailand	Queen Sirikit National Convention Center
Oceania
May 21, 1997	Melbourne	Australia	Palladium Crown Entertainment Complex
Asia
May 25, 1997	Taipei	Taiwan	Taipei Municipal Stadium
Oceania
May 29, 1997	Honolulu	United States	Aloha Stadium

=== Cancelled show ===
Date	City	Country	Venue	Reason
May 22, 1997	Melbourne	Australia	Palladium Crown Entertainment Complex	Cancelled due to throat infection

== Classic Whitney Live ==
Houston performed two special concerts, billed as "Classic Whitney Live from Washington, D.C." at the historic DAR Constitution Hall in Washington D.C. Whitney performed a few of her greatest hits, as well as gospel favorites and songs saluting some of her influences including Dionne Warwick, Aretha Franklin and Diana Ross. The second concert on October 5 was broadcast live on HBO cable channel TV. Whitney and The Whitney Houston Foundation for Children donated the proceeds, over $300,000 from ticket sales to the Children's Defense Fund, a national non-profit organization devoted to providing a voice for all children of America, particularly poor, minority and disabled children.

Set list

1. "I Will Always Love You"
2. "I Know Him So Well" (duet with Cissy Houston)
3. Dionne Warwick Medley: "Walk On By" / "A House Is Not a Home" / "I Say a Little Prayer" / "Alfie"
4. Aretha Franklin Medley: "Baby I Love You" / "(Sweet Sweet Baby) Since You've Been Gone" / "Ain't No Way"
5. Tribute to Sammy Davis Jr.: "Mr. Bojangles" (feat. dance solo by Bobby Brown)
6. Tribute to United States great men: "Abraham, Martin and John"
7. Diana Ross Medley: "God Bless The Child" / "Endless Love" (duet with Gary Houston) / "Ain't No Mountain High Enough" / "The Boss" / "Missing You" (Note: "Missing You" and "I Love the Lord" was not performed at the October 3, show)
8. Tribute to George Gershwin: "I Loves You, Porgy" / "Porgy, I's Your Woman Now" / "Summertime"
9. "Exhale (Shoop Shoop)" (Note: "Exhale (Shoop Shoop)" featured Monica, Shirley Caesar and BeBe Winans at the October 5, show)
10. "I Love the Lord"
11. "I Go to the Rock"
12. "Greatest Love of All"
13. "Amazing Grace" (saxophone solo by Kirk Whalum)
14. "Step by Step"
15. "I'm Every Woman"

Notes

Shows

Date	City	Country	Venue
October 3, 1997	Washington, D.C.	United States	DAR Constitution Hall
October 5, 1997	Washington, D.C.	United States	DAR Constitution Hall

== Box office score data ==
List of concerts, showing date, venue, city, tickets sold, number of available tickets
Date	Venue	City	Attendance	Revenue
May 29, 1997	Aloha Stadium	Honolulu	29,118 / 29,118 (100%)	$1,634,370
