= The Silver Greyhound =

The Silver Greyhound may refer to:

- The Silver Greyhound (1919 film), a British silent film
- The Silver Greyhound (1932 film), a British film

== See also ==
- Silver Greyhound, badge of the Queen's Messengers
