= Walking on Broken Glass =

1992 single by Annie Lennox

Single by Annie Lennox

from the album Diva
- B-side: "Don't Let Me Down"; "Legend in My Living Room"; "River Deep, Mountain High"; "Here Comes the Rain Again"
- Released: 10 August 1992
- Studio: Mayfair (London, England)
- Genre: Pop; soul
- Length: 4:12 (album version); 4:03 (single version)
- Label: RCA
- Songwriter: Annie Lennox
- Producer: Stephen Lipson

Annie Lennox singles chronology
"Precious" (1992)	"Walking on Broken Glass" (1992)	"Cold" (1992)

Music video
- "Walking on Broken Glass" on YouTube

"Walking on Broken Glass" is a song written and performed by Scottish singer Annie Lennox. It was released as the third single from her debut solo studio album, Diva (1992). Produced by Stephen Lipson, it was released on 10 August 1992 by BMG and Arista Records, and achieved considerable commercial success in international territories. It reached number one in Canada and entered the top 10 in the United Kingdom and Ireland. In the United States, it peaked at number 14 on the Billboard Hot 100 chart.

Lyrically, the song focuses on "the turbulent emotions of trying to carry on through the pain of a breakup", and is noted for its "cognitive dissonance" with the music of the song. At the 1993 Brit Awards, the accompanying music video, directed by Sophie Muller and featuring John Malkovich, was nominated for British Video of the Year, and it was also nominated for an MTV Video Music Award for Best Female Video at the 1993 MTV Video Music Awards. The song won the American Society of Composers, Authors and Publishers award in 1994 for Most Performed Songs.

== Background and composition ==
"Walking on Broken Glass" features a Caribbean-inspired piano line at the beginning of the song primarily, and also features within the chorus and at the end of the song, with a mirrored melody on spicatto strings featured throughout the song. Pitchfork commented on the song: "Like so many Eurythmics' best records, it takes an incredibly depressing concept—romantic abandonment—and maps it onto an irresistibly danceable tune". Pitchfork praised the song, claiming it to have "harmonic overdubs".

Lennox's songwriting on "Walking on Broken Glass" was hailed for using contrast to create an emotional intensity of a song and to "bring listeners into an emotional maelstrom" as argued by Margaret Jones. Jones further commented "not only do the lyrics create cognitive dissonance with the music; the music contrasts against itself from section to section. What begins as an upbeat, syncopated string part in C major during the chorus follows a deceptive cadence to a lush A-minor chord at the end of each verse. The sudden shifts in key, texture, and rhythm intensify the protagonist's desperation, moving from the determined action of "walking on broken glass" to the anguish of "since you've abandoned me, my whole life has crashed." This harmonic move happens three times in the song, each time gaining more intensity. In the final instance, the move to A minor shifts from being descriptive to making a plea: "take me from the wreckage, save me from the blast."

The song was described by Andy Healy of Albumism as "whether it’s the upbeat calypso-meets-baroque sense of impending disaster expressed in “Walking on Broken Glass” or the trip-hop backed “Stay By Me” that pleads for understanding and acceptance, her voice remains sweet and intoxicating. In particular, the layering of the backing vocals, a Lennox Chorus if you will, offers such beautiful hues and richness that it envelops you and draws you deeper into the track. All delivered with a sense of empathy and unity at play". “Walking on Broken Glass” was described as a "gloriously weird pop song with one of the oddest intros: prancing strings, strutting keyboards, and the enigmatic line". Pop Matters Magazine claimed that "all of that make the track sound like nothing else on pop radio in 1992".

== Critical reception ==
AllMusic editor Thom Jurek viewed the song as a "ubiquitous" hit. Jennifer Bowles from Associated Press described it as a "more upbeat, mocking tune". Larry Flick from Billboard magazine wrote that it is a "study in stylistic contrasts; retro-soul vocal musing glides atop a pristine, keyboard-and string-anchored modern-pop environment." He also deemed it a "sophisticated, complex respite from the color-by-numbers fare that crowds radio airwaves." Randy Clark from Cashbox stated that the song "is pretty much straight up, but mature pop, and contains more shattered relationship lyrics (I wonder 'why') backed by light percussion, piano, strings and an elaborate background vocal arrangement." Stephanie Zacharek from Entertainment Weekly noted that "the jaunty, Caribbean-flavored 'Walking on Broken Glass' (faintly reminiscent of Eurythmics' 'Right by Your Side') is laden with sharp-edged metaphors for broken love affairs."

Mike Ragogna from HuffPost wrote that Lennox "rolls out its words Joan Armatrading-style, proclaiming 'Every one of us is made to suffer, every one of us is made to weep.' Then, almost to prove the opposite point, she happily gavottes with the groove." Dennis Hunt from Los Angeles Times named it the highlight of the solo debut album and "one of the best tunes she's ever had." A reviewer from Music Week called it "immediately and extremely commercial, with Annie's voice reaching up from a sea of strings. Polished and superior". Kjell Moe from Norwegian newspaper Nordlys noted that the song has "clear Kate Bush-references". Slant Magazine claimed "Walking on Broken Glass" was "one of the most brilliant singles of the era", and later cited the song and its video cast as a "suspicious eye on the deliberate façade-maintenance of modern pop by playing up the same mixed signals that equips Diva with its power".

== Music video ==
The video for "Walking on Broken Glass", showing Lennox

Directed by British director Sophie Muller, the music video for "Walking on Broken Glass" is based in part on the 1988 film Dangerous Liaisons, and on period films set in the late 18th century, such as Amadeus. John Malkovich, who starred in the former film, is joined by Hugh Laurie, in garb similar to the early 19th-century dress he wore to play the Prince Regent in Blackadder the Third.

The setting of the video is that of a salon evening at the Prince Regent's Carlton House. It presents an assembly of nobles and notables for an evening of society, gambling and dancing, the highlight of which is the arrival and feting of the newlyweds. The groom is played by Malkovich.

Lennox's character wears a royal red in an environment dominated by white, a costuming technique designed to draw attention to her, and sports a 'Turkish' headdress in an environment dominated by wigs of the period. She displays significant pique as she is emotionally wounded by the appearance of her former lover on the arm of his new bride.

Throughout the video, Lennox's character communicates conflicting emotions of jealousy, continued desire, and anger towards the man who still holds her heart. In the process, she spurns the previously welcome advances of the Prince Regent, much to his embarrassment, consumes glass after glass of champagne and grows ever more agitated, until she finally throws herself at Malkovich's character, to the shock and amusement of the partygoers. Lennox's character, realizing that she has made a fool of herself, flees the party in a fury, only to be swept into Malkovich's arms when she reaches the foot of the stairs.

== Track listings ==
CD single

No.	Title	Length
1.	"Walking on Broken Glass" (single version)	3:59
2.	"It's Alright (Baby's Coming Back)"	4:18
3.	"River Deep, Mountain High"	3:33
4.	"Here Comes the Rain Again"	4:44
5.	"Walking on Broken Glass"	3:50

Tracks 2 to 5 were recorded for MTV Unplugged in July 1992.

UK CD single

No.	Title	Writer(s)	Length
1.	"Walking on Broken Glass" (single version)		3:59
2.	"Legend in My Living Room"		3:45
3.	"Don't Let Me Down"	Lennon/McCartney	3:49

== Personnel ==
- Engineer – Heff Moraes
- Producer – Stephen Lipson
- Written by – Annie Lennox

== Charts ==
=== Weekly charts ===
Chart (1992)	Peak position
Australia (ARIA)	58
Belgium (Ultratop 50 Flanders)	37
Canada Top Singles (RPM)	1
Canada Adult Contemporary (RPM)	15
Europe (Eurochart Hot 100)	24
Europe (European Hit Radio)	2
Germany (GfK)	51
Ireland (IRMA)	8
Netherlands (Dutch Top 40 Tipparade)	11
Netherlands (Single Top 100)	61
New Zealand (Recorded Music NZ)	23
Sweden (Sverigetopplistan)	31
UK Singles (Official Charts)	8
UK Airplay (Music Week)	1
US Billboard Hot 100	14
US Adult Contemporary (Billboard)	6
US Alternative Airplay (Billboard)	7
US Pop Airplay (Billboard)	3
US Cash Box Top 100	11

=== Year-end charts ===
Chart (1992)	Position
Canada Top Singles (RPM)	19
Europe (European Hit Radio)	19
UK Singles (OCC)	71
UK Airplay (Music Week)	13

== Certifications ==
Region	Certification	Certified units/sales
New Zealand (RMNZ)	Platinum	30,000^{‡}
United Kingdom (BPI)	Platinum	600,000^{‡}
^{‡} Sales+streaming figures based on certification alone.

== Release history ==
Region	Date	Format(s)	Label(s)	Ref.
United Kingdom	10 August 1992	7-inch vinyl; CD; cassette	RCA	
Australia	24 August 1992	CD; cassette	RCA	

== See also ==
- List of number-one singles of 1992 (Canada)
