= Janice Adair =

British actress (1905–1996)

- Born: Beatrice Mary Duffy; 25 May 1905; Morpeth, Northumberland, England, United Kingdom
- Died: 11 November 1996 (aged 91); Gerrards Cross, Buckinghamshire, England, United Kingdom
- Occupation: Actress
- Years active: 1929–1934 (film)
- Spouse: Alfred Roome (m. 1929)
- Children: 2

Janice Adair (25 May 1905 – 11 November 1996) was a British film actress of the early sound era. She was married to the film editor Alfred Roome.

== Biography ==
Janice Adair was born Beatrice Mary Duffy in Morpeth, Northumberland in 1905 to Thomas and Bridget Duffy. She was one of six children: three sons and three daughters. After the family moved to West Hartlepool, Beatrice began her acting career when she joined the local Operatic and Musical Society. In 1925 she played the role of Mina in Miss Hook of Holland and the following year she played Franzi in A Waltz Dream where she was praised for her "magnificent acting". She then went to London with another girl and began hanging around the Islington Film Studios. Eventually the casting director W J O'Bryen found Beatrice a small role. In 1928, Beatrice was cast as Lucy in the film The Streets of London as she was of the "Colleen Moore type". Shortly after, Alfred Hitchcock, who was then at Elstree, chose the stage name Janice Adair for Beatrice which she used for her subsequent roles.

She gave up acting following her marriage to the English film editor Alfred Roome. They were married on 20 February 1936. The ceremony was officiated by two of Beatrice Duffy's brothers the rev Vincent Duffy and the rev Cuthbert Duffy, her third brother Thomas gave her away. The Roomes had two children, a daughter Deirdre, and a son Christopher who died in the Kings Cross Fire in 1987 at age 50.

Beatrice Mary Roome (née Duffy), also known as Janice Adair, died peacefully at her home in Gerrards Cross on 11 November 1996, she was 91.

== Selected filmography ==
- The Informer (1929)
- The Streets of London (1929)
- To What Red Hell (1929)
- Alf's Carpet (1929)
- Red Aces (1930)
- Such Is the Law (1930)
- Detective Lloyd (1931), a serial
- Contraband Love (1931)
- Lloyd of the C.I.D. (1932)
- The Silver Greyhound (1932)
- Flood Tide (1934)
- Nine Forty-Five (1934)

== Bibliography ==
- Goble, Alan. The Complete Index to Literary Sources in Film. Walter de Gruyter, 1999.
