= Utah (film) =

1945 film by John English

- Theatrical release poster
- Directed by: John English
- Written by: Betty Burbridge (story); John K. Butler (writer); Jack Townley (writer); Gilbert Wright (story)
- Produced by: Donald H. Brown (associate producer)
- Starring: Roy Rogers; Trigger
- Cinematography: William Bradford
- Edited by: Harry Keller
- Music by: R. Dale Butts; Joseph Dubin; Mort Glickman
- Production company: Republic Pictures
- Distributed by: Republic Pictures
- Release date: March 21, 1945 (United States)
- Running time: 77 minutes; 54 minutes
- Country: United States
- Language: English

Utah is a 1945 American musical Western film directed by John English and starring Roy Rogers and Dale Evans.

== Plot ==
Misunderstanding what her ranch is worth, Chicago entertainer Dorothy Bryant (Dale Evans) sells the land for far less than its value, so it is up to Roy (Roy Rogers) to somehow get it back. Roy and Dorothy fall in love, and in the final act he joins her in Chicago with some of the cowhands to produce a western-themed revue.

== Cast ==
- Roy Rogers as Roy Rogers
- Trigger as Trigger, Roy's Horse
- George 'Gabby' Hayes as Gabby Wittaker
- Dale Evans as Dorothy Bryant
- Peggy Stewart as Jackie (Dorothy's friend)
- Beverly Loyd as Wanda - Bob's girl friend
- Jill Browning as Babe (Dorothy's showgirl friend)
- Vivien Oakland as Stella Mason
- Grant Withers as Ben Bowman
- Hal Taliaferro as Steve Lacy
- Jack Rutherford as Sheriff McBride
- Emmett Vogan as Chicago Police Chief
- Bob Nolan as Bob
- Sons of the Pioneers as Cowhands / Musicians

== Soundtrack ==
- Roy Rogers and the Sons of the Pioneers - "Lonesome Cowboy Blues" (Written by Tim Spencer)
- Sons of the Pioneers - "Five Little Miles" (Written by Bob Nolan)
- Roy Rogers, Dale Evans and the Sons of the Pioneers - "Utah" (Written by Charles Henderson)
- Dale Evans - "Thank Dixie For Me" (Written by Dave Franklin)
- Roy Rogers and the Sons of the Pioneers - "Utah Trail" (Written by Bob Palmer)
- Roy Rogers - "Beneath a Utah Sky" (Written by Glenn Spencer)
- The Sons of the Pioneers - "Welcome Home Miss Bryant" (Written by Ken Carson)
- Roy Rogers - "Wild and Wooly Gals From Out Chicago Way" (Written by Tim Spencer)
