= Contraband Love =

1931 British film by Sidney Morgan

- Theatrical release advertisement
- Directed by: Sidney Morgan
- Written by: Joan Morgan
- Produced by: Sidney Morgan
- Starring: C. Aubrey Smith; Janice Adair; Haddon Mason
- Production company: British Screenplays
- Distributed by: Paramount Pictures
- Release date: April 1931
- Running time: 67 minutes
- Country: United Kingdom
- Language: English

Contraband Love is a 1931 British crime film directed by Sidney Morgan and starring C. Aubrey Smith, Janice Adair and Haddon Mason. It was made at British and Dominions Elstree Studios and on location in Cornwall. The film was distributed by the American studio Paramount Pictures as a quota quickie.

== Preservation status ==
The British Film Institute National Archive holds a collection of ephemera and stills but no film or video materials.

== Plot ==
Roger is a self-confessed escaped convict, who has joined a smuggling ring with Jude Sterling, a fisherman, and Sampson an ex-theatrical man. Roger falls in love with Janice Machin, daughter of the local magistrate. However, Jude's wife, Belle, believes Roger is in love with her. When she finds out he loves Janice instead, seized with jealousy Belle informs the magistrate. Janice runs to warn Roger that father knows about them. Roger takes the news in his stride. It turns out he is a not a convict at all, but a detective.

== Cast ==
- C. Aubrey Smith as Paul Machin, JP
- Janice Adair as Janice Machin
- Haddon Mason as Roger
- Rosalinde Fuller as Belle Sterling
- Sydney Seaward as Sampson
- Charles Paton as Jude Sterling
- Marie Ault as Sarah Sterling

== Reception ==
Film Weekly wrote: "A sing-song held in an old inn in a fishing village is the outstanding feature of this otherwise conventional story of smugglers and disguised detectives. ... The settings are beautiful; the acting is in the old melodramatic style. Rosalinde Fuller gives us the best performance as the gipsy. Janice Adair minces her way through the picture, speaking with an accent so 'refaned' that it suggests Golders Green rather that a country village."

The Daily Film Renter wrote: "We should advise the director of this picture to get busy with the scissors and eliminate those sequences, particularly in the latter half, where the action is held up for song and sentiment. ... The acting is on a fair level, though it lacks final touches of vigour."

Kine Weekly wrote: "Very good Cornish atmosphere in a rather slight story of love and smugglers. There is some excellent singing, and the acting reaches'a high level. Altogether an attractive British production which should do well anywhere. ... It has the merit of being a pleasant story without the morbidity which is becoming in some cases a characteristic of British pictures."

Picture Show wrote: "Romantic smuggling drama in which the beauty of Devon and Cornish exteriors far outweigh the story, direction, or acting."
