= To What Red Hell =

1929 film

- Directed by: Edwin Greenwood
- Written by: Leslie S. Hiscott; Percy Robinson (play)
- Produced by: Julius Hagen
- Starring: Sybil Thorndike; Janice Adair; Bramwell Fletcher
- Cinematography: Basil Emmott
- Music by: John Greenwood
- Production company: Strand Films
- Distributed by: Strand Films
- Release date: November 1929
- Running time: 100 minutes
- Country: United Kingdom
- Languages: Sound (All-Talking); English

To What Red Hell is an all-talking sound 1929 British crime film directed by Edwin Greenwood and starring Sybil Thorndike, Bramwell Fletcher and Janice Adair. Made at Twickenham Studios, it was one of the earliest all-talking sound films to be produced in Britain.

It was released in the United States by Tiffany Pictures.

== Cast ==
- Sybil Thorndike as Mrs. Fairfield
- John Hamilton as Harold Fairfield
- Bramwell Fletcher as Jim Nolan
- Jillian Sand as Eleanor Dunham
- Janice Adair as Madge Barton
- Arthur Pusey as George Hope
- Athole Stewart as Mr. Fairfield
- Drusilla Wills as Mrs. Ellis
- Wyn Weaver as Dr. Barton
- Matthew Boulton as Inspector Jackson
- Sara Allgood

== See also ==
- List of early sound feature films (1926–1929)

== Bibliography ==
- Low, Rachael. History of the British Film, 1918–1929. George Allen & Unwin, 1971.
- Wood, Linda. British Films, 1927-1939. British Film Institute, 1986.
