= Roman Scandals =

1933 film by Frank Tuttle

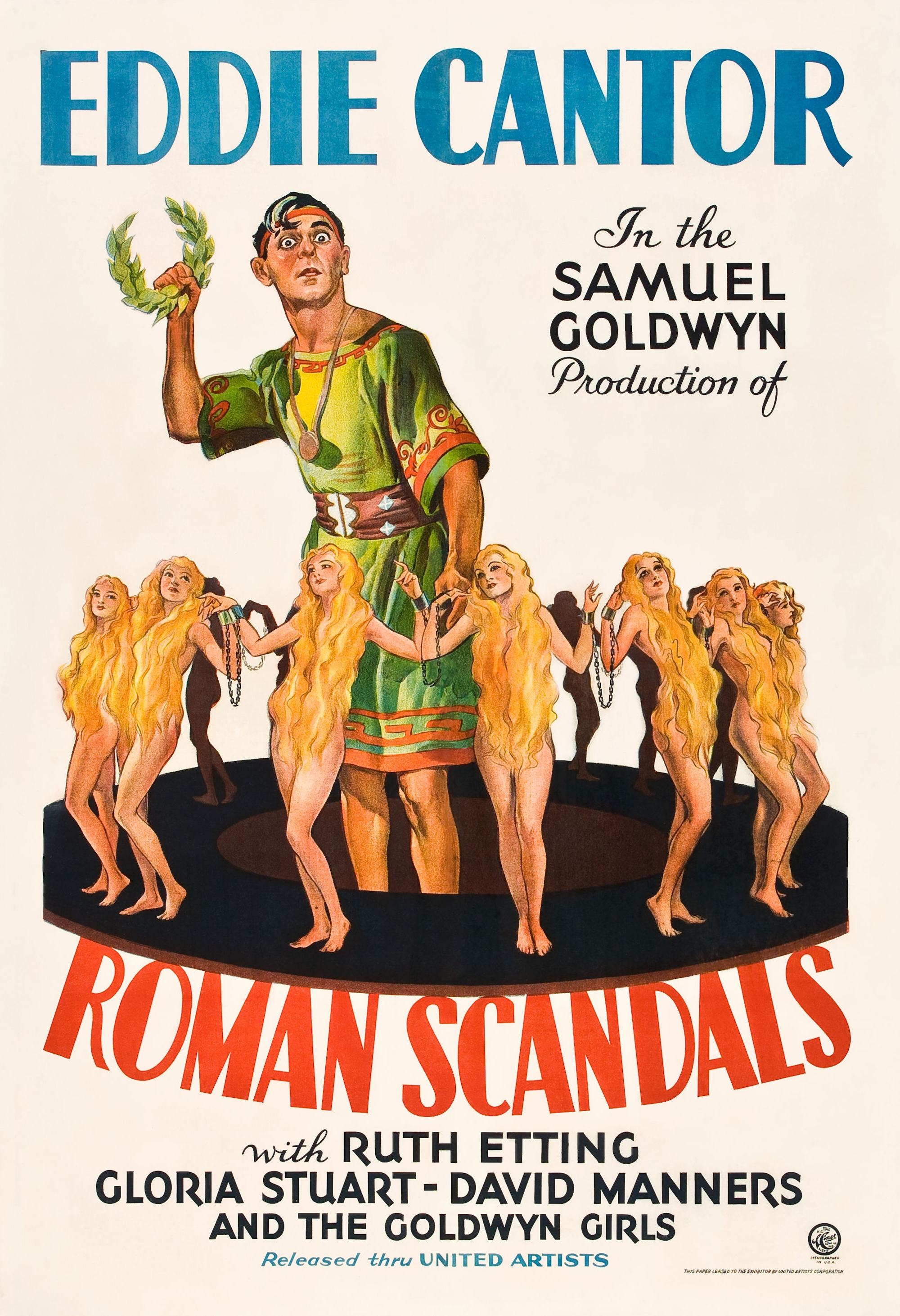
- Directed by: Frank Tuttle
- Written by: William Anthony McGuire based on the story by George Kaufman
- Produced by: Samuel Goldwyn
- Starring: Eddie Cantor
- Cinematography: Ray June; Gregg Toland
- Edited by: Stuart Heisler
- Music by: Alfred Newman
- Production company: Samuel Goldwyn Productions
- Distributed by: United Artists
- Release date: December 25, 1933
- Running time: 93 minutes
- Country: United States
- Language: English
- Budget: US$1,000,000 (est.)
- Box office: $2,443,000

Roman Scandals is a 1933 American black-and-white pre-Code musical film starring Eddie Cantor, Ruth Etting, Gloria Stuart, Edward Arnold and David Manners. It was directed by Frank Tuttle. The film features a number of intricate production numbers choreographed by Busby Berkeley. The song "Keep Young and Beautiful" is from this film. In addition to the starring actors in the picture, the elaborate dance numbers are performed by the "Goldwyn Girls" (who in this film include future stars such as Lucille Ball, Paulette Goddard and Barbara Pepper). The title of the film is a pun on Roman sandals.

== Plot ==
In the middle-America community of West Rome, Oklahoma, Eddie is employed as a delivery boy.

A self-styled authority of Ancient Roman history, Eddie bemoans the fact that the local shanty community is about to be wiped out by scheming politicians, certain that such an outrage could never have happened during Rome's Golden Days. After a blow to the head, Eddie wakes up in Imperial Rome, where he is sold on the slave auction block to good-natured tribune Josephus. Eddie soon discovers that the evil emperor Valerius is every bit a crook and grafter as the politicians in West Rome, and he intends to do something about it.

He gets a job as food taster for Valerius—a none-too-secure position, inasmuch as the emperor's wife, Agrippa, is constantly trying to poison him—and does his best to smooth the path of romance for Josephus and the recently captured Princess Sylvia. Eddie's well-intentioned interference earns him a session in the torture chamber, but he escapes and commandeers a chariot. On the verge of capture, Eddie wakes to find himself in West Rome, OK again, where he quickly foils the modern-day despots and brings about a happy ending for all his friends.

== Cast ==
- Eddie Cantor as Eddie/Oedipus
- The Goldwyn Girls as Slave Girls
- Ruth Etting as Olga
- Gloria Stuart as Princess Sylvia
- Edward Arnold as Emperor Valerius
- David Manners as Josephus
- Verree Teasdale as Empress Agrippa
- Alan Mowbray as Majordomo
- Jack Rutherford as Manius
- Willard Robertson as Warren Finley Cooper
- Lee Kohlmar as Storekeeper
- Harry Cording as Soldier (uncredited)
- Francis Ford as Citizen (uncredited)
- Murdock MacQuarrie as Senator (uncredited)

== Soundtrack ==
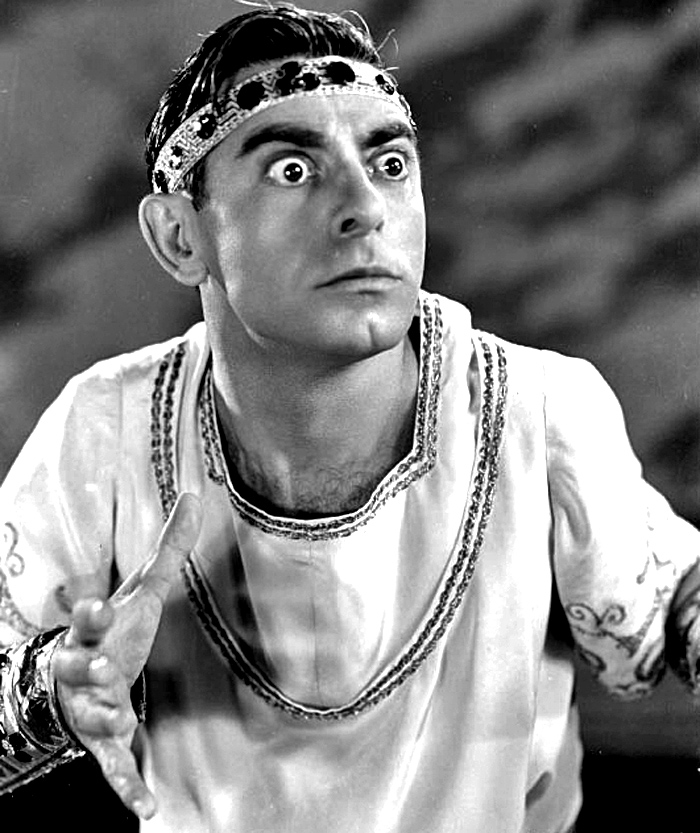
Eddie Cantor as Oedipus in Roman Scandals

- "Build a Little Home"

Music by Harry Warren
Lyrics by Al Dubin
Performed by Eddie Cantor and chorus
Reprised by Eddie Cantor and chorus

- "No More Love"

Music by Harry Warren
Lyrics by Al Dubin
Sung by Ruth Etting
Danced by chorus

- "Keep Young and Beautiful"

Music by Harry Warren
Lyrics by Al Dubin
Performed by Eddie Cantor with chorus
Danced by chorus

- "Put a Tax on Love"

Music by Harry Warren
Lyrics by Al Dubin
Sung by Eddie Cantor

- "All of Me"

Music by Gerald Marks
Lyrics by Seymour Simons
Sung by Eddie Cantor

- "Dinah"

Music by Harry Akst
Lyrics by Sam Lewis and Joe Young
Sung by Eddie Cantor

- "Kickin' the Gong Around"

Music by Harold Arlen
Lyrics by Ted Koehler
Sung by Eddie Cantor

- "Turkey in the Straw"

Traditional
Played in the opening scene

== Critical response ==
A written media review is located in Monthly Film Bulletin (UK), Vol. 1, Iss. 8, September 1934, (MG)

== Reception ==
The film was one of United Artists' most popular films of the year.

== See also ==
- List of American films of 1933
