= Flood tide (disambiguation) =

Flood tide is the rising tide of an ocean, the opposite of ebb tide

It may also refer to:

- Flood Tide (novel), a novel by Clive Cussler
- Flood Tide (1934 film), a British drama film
- Flood Tide (1958 film), an American drama romance film
- Flood Tide, an anthology of short fiction in the Merovingen Nights science fiction series

== See also ==
- Floodtide, a 1948 British romantic drama
- Floodtide (TV series) 1967 British/French miniseries
