= Pattie Howard =

American singer

- Also known as: Pattie Howard, Patty Howard, Patti Howard, Patience
- Born: Francine Patience Howard; Cleveland, Ohio
- Origin: Cleveland, Ohio, United States
- Genres: R&B, gospel, jazz, funk
- Occupations: CEO, singer-songwriter, record producer, music producer
- Instruments: voice, violin
- Years active: 1970's-present
- Labels: RCA, Light Records
- Website: PHBalancedMusic.com

Pattie Howard (born Francine Patience Howard) is an American gospel and R&B Singer-Songwriter, Producer, Composer and Vocal Arranger. She is a Grammy nominated music industry veteran who has released two albums with major record labels, RCA Records and Light Records. Howard, who owns her own full service entertainment company, PH Balanced Music, is also known for singing background for many major artists including Whitney Houston, Gladys Knight, Brandy, Mary J Blige, Fantasia, Queen LaTifah, Madonna, Rick Astley, Andrae Crouch, Sandra Crouch, Michael Jackson, Curtis Stiger, Lisa Stansfield, BeBe and CeCe Winans, Reba Rambo, and Diana Ross. She has dozens of gold and platinum albums to her credits encompassing artists from almost every genre. Howard landed one of her most profound gigs traveling the world with Whitney Houston from 1992 to 2001, at the height of her career, The Bodyguard Era. During the early 2000s, Howard returned to songwriting, music production, mixing, and mastering and is currently singing (solo & background), composing, arranging and producing various artists/bands. In 2016 Pattie released 2 singles through her record label PH Balanced Music. "Jesus Is His Name" introduces Pattie's daughter Shekinah Nicole Howard in a contemporary gospel duet produced by Wow Jones and co produced by Pattie Howard. The second single titled "Feel Me, Heal Me" was also Produced by Wow Jones, written and arranged by Pattie Howard. Pattie Howard is featured in the Nick Broomfield Documentary Whitney Houston "Can I Be Me".

== Early life ==
Born in Cleveland, Ohio, Howard, coming from a musical family, began studying violin at age seven and wrote her first composition, winning first place in the Cleveland public school classical competition citywide in her first year. Her mother, Sarah Howard Mayes played piano and was a member of several female gospel groups in her early years and her father, the late Rev. Frank Love also traveled as a gospel quartet singer. Pattie's brother, Michael Howard toured the world with Zola Taylor and The Platters, and her sister Sharlene Grahm-Hairston was well known in the gospel community for her rich contralto voice, singing with The Aaron Holbrook Singers and The James Wade Singers of Cleveland Ohio. Pattie recorded her first song at age 13 as a lead singer in the gospel group "All God's Children" along with her sister Sederia "CD" Graves and began singing professionally at age 17, traveling worldwide with various major artists. At the age of 19, Pattie formed her first band with the help of her sister and Manager Eva Brown called Pattie Love and Fun, in Los Angeles California. It was during this time that her writing and arrangement skills surfaced again, and her career as a solo artist began to emerge. Her first solo recording was entitled "Second Thoughts". Many of Howard's earlier credits are listed as "Francine Howard" before she settled on the stage name of "Pattie Howard".

== Music career ==
=== RCA records ===
In 1985, Pattie came to the attention of Lonnie Simmons, President of Total Experience/RCA Records, home of legendary artists The Gap Band, Yarborough and Peoples, and Penny Ford. Mr. Simmons offered Pattie Howard a recording contract to produce and record her self-titled debut album- Pattie Howard, a collection of the first songs ever written and produced by Ms. Howard. "Selfish", was the first single released from Pattie Howard.

=== Light records ===
In 1991, after catching the attention of then-president Ralph Carmichael, Howard was offered another major record deal. Howard released her second album, The Vision, on Light Records, which at the time was home to Andrae Crouch, Edwin Hawkins, Walter Hawkins and Kurt Carr. The album was co-produced by Grammy Award winning Gospel Legend Andrae Crouch and Keith Crouch who is known for his work with singer Brandy Norwood.

=== Tours and current events ===
Shortly after The Vision was released, Pattie was hired to tour the world with singer Whitney Houston on The Bodyguard World Tour. She continued to tour with Houston and other artists throughout the 1990s and early 2000s.

== Discography ==
=== Solo ===
- Pattie Howard – 1985 RCA
- The Vision – 1991 Light Records
- "Jesus Is His Name Featuring Shekinah Nicole" – 2016 PH Balanced Music
- "Heal Me" – 2016 PH Balanced Music

=== Studio sessions ===
Under the name Francine Howard

- Michael Jackson- Bad (1987)
- Michael Jackson- Man in the Mirror (1988)
- Laura Branigan- Laura Branigan (1990)
- Michael Jackson- Dangerous (1991)
- Michael Jackson- History (1995)

Under the name Pattie Howard

- Julio Iglesias- Non Stop (1988)
- Quincy Jones- Back on the Block (1989)
- Andrae Crouch- Finally (1990)
- Gladys Knight- Good Woman (1991)
- Peabo Bryson- Can You Stop The Rain (1991)
- Trini Lopez- 25th Anniversary Album (1991)
- Curtis Stigers- Curtis Stigers (1991)
- James Ingram- Greatest Hits (1991)
- Petra (band)- En Alabanza (1992)
- El Debarge- In the Storm (1992)
- Sandra Crouch- With All My Heart (1992)
- Andrae Crouch- Mercy (1994)
- Reba Rambo-McGuire & Donny McGuire- Suddenly (1994)
- Gerald Albright- Smooth (1994)
- Madonna- Like A Prayer (1995)
- Giorgia Todrani- Strano il Mio Destiny (1996)
- Ed Montgomery- I Still Believe (2000)
- The Dreamers- They Sound Like Angels(2001)
- Philip Bailey- Life and Love (2002)
- Israel Houghton- Real (2002)
- David & Lisa Binion- Sound of Heaven, Vol.1 (2003)
- Judith McAllister- Raise the Praise (2003)
- Petra (band)- Power of Praise (2003)
- Andrae Crouch- Mighty Wind (2005)
- Ruth Ann Galatas- Favorite Things (2006)
- Ruth Ann Galatas- Piano Lady (2007)
- Donnie McClurkin- The Healing Song (2009)
- Lana Del Rey- The Grants (2023)

=== Tours and performances ===
- Martha Reeves Various Performances
- Andrae Crouch Tours
- Michael Jackson- Grammy Awards Man in the Mirror
- Whitney Houston- The Bodyguard World Tour 1993–1994
- Whitney Houston- Whitney: The Concert for a New South Africa 1994
- Grammy Awards
- Giorgia Tour – 1995
- Whitney Houston- Pacific Rim Tour 1997
- Whitney Houston- Classic Whitney Live from Washington, D.C.
- Whitney Houston- The European Tour 1998
- Whitney Houston- My Love Is Your Love World Tour 1999
- VH1 Divas Live
- American Idol- Fantasia Burrino
- Ethan Bortnick PBS Special 2010
- Ethan Bortnick PBS Special 2013
