= The Streets of London (1929 film) =

1929 film

- Directed by: Norman Lee
- Written by: Norman Lee
- Produced by: H.B. Parkinson
- Starring: David Dunbar; Jack Rutherford; Charles Lincoln; Wera Engels
- Cinematography: Bryan Langley
- Production company: H.B. Parkinson Films
- Distributed by: Pioneer Film Distributors
- Release date: January 1929
- Country: United Kingdom
- Languages: Silent; English intertitles

The Streets of London is a 1929 British silent crime film directed by Norman Lee and starring David Dunbar, Wera Engels and Jack Rutherford. It was adapted from Dion Boucicault's play of the same title and was made at Isleworth Studios.

== Plot ==
A man embezzles the fortune of a dead captain's daughter.

== Cast ==
- David Dunbar as Gideon Bloodgood
- Wera Engels as Alida
- Jack Rutherford as Mark Livingstone
- Charles Lincoln as Inspector Benson
- Beatrice Duffy as Lucy
- Janice Adair as Girl

== Bibliography ==
- Low, Rachel. The History of British Film: Volume IV, 1918–1929. Routledge, 1997.
- Wood, Linda. British Films, 1927-1939. British Film Institute, 1986.
