= Rollin' Home to Texas =

- Theatrical release poster
- Directed by: Albert Herman
- Screenplay by: Robert Emmett Tansey
- Produced by: Edward Finney
- Starring: Tex Ritter; Cal Shrum; Slim Andrews; Virginia Carpenter; Eddie Dean; Jack Rutherford
- Cinematography: Marcel Le Picard
- Edited by: Fred Bain
- Music by: Frank Sanucci
- Production company: Monogram Pictures
- Distributed by: Monogram Pictures
- Release date: December 30, 1940
- Running time: 63 minutes
- Country: United States
- Language: English

Rollin' Home to Texas is a 1940 American Western film directed by Albert Herman and written by Robert Emmett Tansey. The film stars Tex Ritter, Cal Shrum, Slim Andrews, Virginia Carpenter, Eddie Dean and Jack Rutherford. The film was released on December 30, 1940, by Monogram Pictures.

== Cast ==
- Tex Ritter as Tex Reed
- Cal Shrum as Cal Shrum
- Slim Andrews as Slim Hunkapillar
- Virginia Carpenter as Mary Gray
- Eddie Dean as Eddie Dean
- Jack Rutherford as Carter
- Minta Durfee (uncredited)
- Walt Shrum as Smokey
- I. Stanford Jolley as Red
- Charles R. Phipps as Uncle Jim
- Harry Harvey Sr. as Lockwood
- Olin Francis as Marshal
- White Flash as Tex's horse
