= Jack Rutherford (actor) =

British actor

- Born: 12 April 1893; England
- Died: 21 August 1982 (aged 89); Patagonia, Arizona; United States
- Occupations: Film actor and Television actor

Jack Rutherford (April 12, 1893 – August 21, 1982) was a British film and television actor. Rutherford first appeared in British films in leading or prominent supporting roles during the silent era. He later went to Hollywood, where he often played villains in Western films. His most significant American role was as the Sheriff in the 1930 comedy Whoopee! (1930).

== Selected filmography ==
- The Great Shadow (1920) - Bo Sherwood
- The Marriage Business (1927) - Duncan
- The Streets of London (1929) - Mark Livingstone
- Whoopee! (1930) - Sheriff Bob Wells
- Half Shot at Sunrise (1930) - MP Sergeant
- Mr. Lemon of Orange (1931) - Henchman Castro (uncredited)
- The Woman from Monte Carlo (1932) - Verguson
- My Pal, the King (1932) - Herald (uncredited)
- A Successful Calamity (1932) - Wilton's Chauffeur
- Cowboy Counsellor (1932) - Bill Clary
- Roman Scandals (1933) - Manius
- The Affairs of Cellini (1934) - Captain of the Guards
- Cleopatra (1934) - Drussus - Model Builder (uncredited)
- The Man Who Reclaimed His Head (1934) - A Soldier (uncredited)
- Cardinal Richelieu (1935) - Outrider (uncredited)
- Social Error (1935) - Police Desk Sergeant (uncredited)
- Justice of the Range (1935) - Lafe Brennan
- The Crusades (1935) - Knight (uncredited)
- The Oregon Trail (1936) - Benton
- Heart of the West (1936) - Tom Paterson
- Three on the Trail (1936) - Henchman Lewis
- Rootin' Tootin' Rhythm (1937) - Henchman (uncredited)
- North of the Rio Grande (1937) - Ace Crowder
- Raw Timber (1937) - Supervisor Lane
- Hopalong Rides Again (1937) - Blackie
- Fit for a King (1937) - Ship's Officer (uncredited)
- Ali Baba Goes to Town (1937) - Sentry (uncredited)
- The Buccaneer (1938) - Orderly (uncredited)
- Gold Is Where You Find It (1938) - Miner (uncredited)
- Flaming Frontiers (1938, Serial) - Buffalo Bill Cody / Henchman Rand
- Riders of the Frontier (1939) - Bart Lane
- Yukon Flight (1940) - James Benton (uncredited)
- Florian (1940) - Groom (uncredited)
- Arizona Gang Busters (1940) - Thorpe
- Trailing Double Trouble (1940) - Amos Hardy
- North West Mounted Police (1940) - Corporal (uncredited)
- Riders of Black Mountain (1940) - Biff Hunter
- Rollin' Home to Texas (1940) - Carter
- High Sierra (1941) - Policeman (uncredited)
- Corregidor (1943) - General (uncredited)
- Utah (1945) - Sheriff McBride
- Road to Utopia (1945) - Townsman (uncredited)
- Frontier Gal (1945) - Barfly (uncredited)
- Untamed Fury (1947) - Nubie Blair
- Kiss of Death (1947) - Policeman (uncredited)
- Cult of the Cobra (1955) - Policeman (uncredited)

== Bibliography ==
- Harker, Ina Rae. American Cinema of The 1930s: Themes and Variations. Rutgers University Press, 2007.
- Low, Rachel. The History of British Film: Volume IV, 1918–1929. Routledge, 1997.
