= Keep Young and Beautiful =

1933 song

"Keep Young and Beautiful" is a song by Al Dubin (lyrics) and Harry Warren (music), performed by Eddie Cantor and a chorus in the 1933 film Roman Scandals. The lyrics exhort women to "keep young and beautiful, if you want to be loved", and give advice to that end such as the proper use of cosmetics. In the original performance Cantor's character has been put in blackface and mistaken for an "Ethiopian beauty specialist", the song is performed in that role.

A recording by Abe Lyman and His California Orchestra was released in 1934.

Annie Lennox recorded a cover of the song for her album Diva (1992).

While it does not appear in the original 1980 version, the song is used in act 1 for the 2001 Broadway revival of Warren and Dubin's 42nd Street. The cast recording is performed by Mary Testa, Jonathan Freeman, and the ensemble.

The song was a favourite of Winston Churchill.
