= Classic Whitney: Live from Washington, D.C. =

1997 live concerts by Whitney Houston

- Concert by Whitney Houston
- Venue: DAR Constitution Hall in Washington, D.C., U.S.
- Date(s): October 3, 1997; October 5, 1997
- Supporting acts: Cissy Houston; BeBe Winans; Monica; Shirley Caesar
- Attendance: over 2,500

Classic Whitney: Live from Washington, D.C., were live concerts by Whitney Houston.

The concerts were held at historic DAR Constitution Hall in Washington D.C., on October 3 and 5, 1997. The second-night concert was broadcast live via HBO, which was her third HBO special after Welcome Home Heroes with Whitney Houston in March 1991 and Whitney: The Concert for a New South Africa in November 1994. The first-night concert was broadcast on HBO in late October 1997.

Houston said her one-woman show was especially significant because it was occurring during the 100th anniversary of opera singer Marian Anderson's birthday. Houston dedicated her performance to Anderson's memory and her historic attempt to perform in 1939 at Constitution Hall, where she was banned by the Daughters of the American Revolution (DAR).

== Critical reception ==
In his book Tinderbox, James Andrew Miller's wrote that the special was viewed as a debacle by HBO.

== History ==
Houston performed over 20 songs in the concerts, including some of her biggest hits, including "I Will Always Love You", "Exhale (Shoop Shoop)", and "Greatest Love of All".

== Set list ==
1. "I Will Always Love You"
2. "I Know Him So Well" (duet with Cissy Houston)
3. Dionne Warwick Medley:
  - "Walk On By" / "A House Is Not a Home" / "I Say a Little Prayer" / "Alfie"
4. Aretha Franklin Medley:
  - "Baby I Love You" / "(Sweet Sweet Baby) Since You've Been Gone" / "Ain't No Way"
5. Tribute to Sammy Davis Jr.:
  - "Mr. Bojangles" (feat. dance solo by Bobby Brown)
6. Tribute to United States great men:
  - "Abraham, Martin and John"
7. Diana Ross Medley:
  - "God Bless the Child" / "Endless Love" (duet with Gary Houston) / "Ain't No Mountain High Enough" / "The Boss" / "Missing You"
8. Tribute to George Gershwin:
  - "I Loves You, Porgy" / "Porgy, I's Your Woman Now" / "Summertime"
9. "Exhale (Shoop Shoop)" (BeBe Winans, Monica and Shirley Caesar joined in ad-lib of song's finishing part in the second concert.)
10. "I Love the Lord"
11. "I Go to the Rock"
12. "Greatest Love of All"

Encore

13. "Amazing Grace" (saxophone solo by Kirk Whalum)
14. "Step by Step"
15. "I'm Every Woman"

== Personnel ==
- Marty Callner - Director
- Whitney Houston - Executive Producer
- Marty Callner - Producer
- Bill Brigode - Co-Producer
- Randall Gladstein - Co-Producer
- Laurie Badami - Associate Producer
- Rickey Minor - Associate Producer
- Alan Jacobs - Director of Security for Whitney Houston
- Jeff Thorsen - Line Producer
- Tony Bulluck - Tour Manager
- Jimmy Searl - Road Manager
- Nick Jeen - Production Manager
- Risa Thomas - Script Supervisor
- Sara Fung Niimi - Script Coordinator
- Doug Barry - Technical Supervisor
- Keith Winikoff - Technical Director
- Randall Gladstein - Stage Manager
- Gary Natoli - Stage Manager
- Cheryl Teetzel - Production Coordinator
- Erik Jensen - Production Coordinator
- William Hadley - Production Manager
- Rocky Danielson - Camera Operator
- David Eastwood - Camera Operator
- Tom Geren - Camera Operator
- Robert L Highton - Camera Operator
- Dave Hilmer - Camera Operator
- Lyn Noland - Camera Operator
- Wayne Orr - Camera Operator
- Kenneth A Patterson - Camera Operator
- Bill Philbin - Camera Operator
- David Plakos - Camera Operator
- Manny Rodriguez - Camera Operator
- Scott Johnson - Camera Operator
- Bruce Solberg - Videotape Operator
- Bill Lorenz - Videotape Operator
- Paul Ranieri - Video
- Susan Noll - Video
- Greg Brunton - Lighting
- Sam Drummy - Camera Operator
- Ron Sheldon - Camera Operator
- Rickey Minor - Music Director
- Alan Fitzgerald - Music
- Victor Rodriguez - Music
- Mellios Papaterpou - Music
- Sy Smith - Backup vocalist
- Sharlotte Gibson - Backup vocalist
- Pattie Howard - Backup vocalist
- Joseph Dorose - Performer
- Whitney Houston - Song Performer
- Victor O Hall - Music
- Joe Wolfe - Music
- Joseph Dorose - Music Performer
- Valjean Leiker - Music
- Dirk Vanoucek - Music Supervisor
- Bruce Ryan - Production Designer
- Kent McFann - Art Director
- Caren Reiser - Executive
- Norm Levin - Consultant
- Carolyn Ensminger - Hair Stylist
- Roxanna Floyd - Makeup
- Ellen White - Wardrobe
- Ellin LaVar - Hair Stylist
- Rose Sellers - Wardrobe
- Michael Murray - Wardrobe
- Jeff Fecteau - Audio
- Debbie Kelman-Fecteau - Audio
- Peter San Filipo - Audio
- Don Worsham - Audio Mixer
- Mark Bradley - Sound
- Michael J White - Sound
- Philip Miranda - Sound
- George Strakis - Audio
- Harry Netti - Audio
- Roy Simmons - Sound
- Ishai Ratz - Sound
- Lisa Gilhausen - Lighting Technician
- Renee Adrienne Smith - Stand-in
- Greg Hoffman - Key Grip
- Vicki Brenner - Gaffer
- Russell Morris - Best Boy
- Irv Gorman - Best Boy
- Donny Arrows - Dolly Grip
- Kurt Schupp - Carpenter
- Wendell Jones - Carpenter
- Elisa Arden - Graphics
- Gordon Vernon - ASL Interpreter
- Scott Wallace - ASL Interpreter
