= The Silver Greyhound (1932 film) =

1932 film

- Directed by: William C. McGann
- Written by: Roland Pertwee; John Hastings Turner
- Produced by: Irving Asher
- Starring: Percy Marmont; Anthony Bushell; Janice Adair
- Cinematography: Basil Emmott
- Production company: Warner Brothers
- Distributed by: Warner Brothers
- Release date: September 1932
- Running time: 47 minutes
- Country: United Kingdom
- Language: English

The Silver Greyhound is a 1932 British thriller film directed by William C. McGann and starring Percy Marmont, Anthony Bushell and Janice Adair. The film is a quota quickie, made at Teddington Studios by the British subsidiary of the Hollywood company Warner Brothers.

== Cast ==
- Percy Marmont as Norton Fitzwarren
- Anthony Bushell as Gerald Varrick
- Janice Adair as Ira Laennic
- Harry Hutchinson as Regan
- J.A. O'Rourke as O'Brien
- Dino Galvani as Valdez
- Eric Stanley as Valdez

== Bibliography ==
- Low, Rachael. Filmmaking in 1930s Britain. George Allen & Unwin, 1985.
- Wood, Linda. British Films, 1927-1939. British Film Institute, 1986.
