= Why (Annie Lennox song) =

1992 single by Annie Lennox

Single by Annie Lennox

from the album Diva
- B-side: "Primitive"
- Released: 16 March 1992
- Studio: Mayfair, The Church (London, England)
- Genre: Soul; pop
- Length: 4:53
- Label: RCA
- Songwriter: Annie Lennox
- Producer: Stephen Lipson

Annie Lennox singles chronology
| "Put a Little Love in Your Heart" (1988) | "Why" (1992) | "Precious" (1992) |

Music video
- "Why" on YouTube

"Why" is the debut solo single from Scottish singer-songwriter Annie Lennox, released on 16 March 1992 by RCA Records as the lead single from her debut solo album Diva (1992). Written by Lennox and produced by Stephen Lipson, it has since become considered as a signature song for Lennox, and has been credited for its emotional songwriting technique.

Despite being considered a "risky choice" to launch her solo career, the song achieved considerable commercial success in international territories, including in the United Kingdom, where it peaked at number five on the UK Singles Chart, and in the United States, where it reached number 34 on the Billboard Hot 100. Additionally, "Why" reached number one in Italy and entered the top 10 in nine other countries. Its accompanying music video was directed by Sophie Muller and filmed in Italy.

It won the Ivor Novello Award for Best Song Musically and Lyrically in 1993, and the MTV Video Music Award for Best Female Video at the 1992 ceremony. The song has endured a considerable legacy since its initial release, with Stereogum ranking "Why" number one on their list of "The 10 Best Annie Lennox Songs" in 2015.

== Background ==
"Why" was Lennox's first solo release since the split of Eurythmics. She had collaborated with musician Al Green in 1988 on the single "Put a Little Love in Your Heart" which achieved commercial success, and later included on the soundtrack for the movie Scrooged (1988). The song was noted for its "contemplative string-like synth and piano intro" which was credited as creating the "lush three-part vocal harmony singing the song's title, evoking a heavenly gospel choir and essentially serving as the song's chorus". In an interview with the BBC, Lennox described the song as "a deep dialogue with myself in a funny way", and claimed the song was written "about communication, or lack of communication".

The composition of "Why" moves from a style of "questioning and personal doubts", to creating a sense of a "fierce and emotional call to arms". Lennox described the songwriting technique as being "a denouncement of things that have been applied to me that I feel are not me." The song was described by Classic Pop magazine as Lennox's attempt to challenge the different preconceptions that exists about her character, both on and off stage. The song has been credited as establishing Lennox's solo career in the early 1990s, and as a "timeless star for any era". Despite being viewed as a relatively risky choice as the lead single to launch her solo career due to its low beat and sensitive nature, it has since become a "totem" for Lennox and something which she claimed to deliberate in order to launch her solo career in a manner which left her "extremely exposed". In 2022, The Guardian ranked "Why" as the thirteenth best Annie Lennox song.

== Composition ==
Speaking to the BBC in 1992, Lennox described "Why" as being "a deep dialogue with myself", stating that the song was inspired by ones lack of communication. At the end of the song, Lennox describes the ending as "a big rant", stating that she wrote that part of the song to affirm to others that she is not what she had often been portrayed by others to be. She described her writing technique for the ending of the song as a "denouncement of things that had been applied" to her up until that point in her career, further adding that she "reserves the right" to not let people know exactly who she is as a person. Lennox stated in the same interview that she wished for her creativity to be true during the writing of the album, stating, "if you are going to be creative you better be off the wall rather than sitting in the middle of it all feeling comfortable".

== Release and chart performance ==
"Why" was released as the lead single from her debut solo album Diva (1992), and achieved considerable commercial success internationally. It was released on 16 March 1992, and was recorded at both Mayfair Studios and The Church Studios in London. It was released as her first single since the split of Eurythmics, and became the first of four top ten solo singles for Lennox in the United Kingdom. Upon release, "Why" was the most played track across European radio networks.

"Why" was successful on the charts in several countries, peaking at number one in Italy. In Europe, it reached the top 10 in Belgium, Denmark, Ireland, the Netherlands, Norway, Sweden, Switzerland, and the United Kingdom, as well as on the Eurochart Hot 100, where it peaked at number three. In the UK, the single reached number five in its third week at the UK Singles Chart, on 5 April 1992. Additionally, it was a top-20 hit in Austria, Germany and Spain. Outside Europe, "Why" reached number seven on the RPM 100 Hit Tracks chart in Canada, number 15 in New Zealand, number 17 in Australia, and number 34 on the US Billboard Hot 100. On the Billboard Adult Contemporary, it peaked at number six.

It was subsequently certified Silver status by the British Phonographic Industry (BPI), indicating sales in excess of 200,000 copies. At the 1992 MTV Video Music Awards, it won the MTV Video Music Award for Best Female Video and won an Ivor Novello Award in 1993 for Best Song Musically & Lyrically. In 1992, it was nominated for a Billboard Music Video Award in the Best Pop/Rock Female Video category.

== Critical reception ==
Jennifer Bowles from Associated Press described the song as an "emotional" and "hypnotizing ballad". Larry Flick from Billboard magazine called it a "soft-yet-vivid ballad that beautifully showcases the rich and distinctive tone of her voice". He noted the "sophisticated nature of track [that] will strain at (and should ultimately knock down) the tight boundaries of top 40 radio." Clark and DeVancy from Cashbox named it a "soulful ballad", that "is stirring attention, which is, of course, Annie's forte." Keith Wallace from Columbia Daily Spectator said that "Why" "wants to be a soulful ballad, but it's so drippy and goofy that it doesn't come anywhere close." Stephanie Zacharek from Entertainment Weekly noted how "languorously [Lennox] stretches that word across several measures as if she were unfurling a length of satin." Dave Sholin from the Gavin Report stated that the "haunting" song is "a testament to her singing and writing prowess." Another GR editor, Kent Zimmerman, called it "spiritually ultrasonic, breathtakingly sophisticated, lyrically telling and congruently adult in texture and tempo."

A reviewer from Music & Media commented that the singer "confidently goes AC on her first solo effort" and it is "gently moving and highly polished. She could hardly move farther away from the stirring rock of Eurythmics." Nick Griffiths from Select said that it is "the sort of tasteful soulful ballady thing you 'd probably expect of her by now, and when the tide of tasteful soulful balladiness swamps her halfway through it's no surprise either." Slant Magazines Eric Henderson wrote that "Why" is "hardly the sort of melodramatic setting we'd imagine from an album whose very name evokes histrionic pretense. But Annie Lennox isn't and has never been a representative pop diva. Her body is lanky and angular instead of curvaceously plush. Her exaggerated facial features (capped off with a most spectacular set of cheekbones that she wisely never allowed her hair to grow long enough to cover) are matched in androgen-fabulousness only by her tremulously guttural alto." Harry Dean from Smash Hits complimented the song as a "glistening beauty".

=== Retrospective response ===
In a 2009 retrospective review, Mike Ragogna from HuffPost wrote that Lennox' vocal approach "evokes" Sting and Paul Simon and added "she declares, "This is the book I never read, these are the words I never said, this is the path I'll never tread", then went on to say, "These are the dreams I'll dream instead", making this her sideways stab at creating her own "My Way" (as the artist points out in the notes [of her 2009 collection])."

Stereogum ranked "Why" number one in their list of the 10 best Annie Lennox songs in 2015. They wrote, "And while the album maybe didn't live up to those hopes, Diva's first single remains an enduring classic. A bold enough move to have your first single be a torch ballad of regret, but this one is a weeper for the ages. It's a musical version of the Kübler-Ross model with Lennox hitting the grief stage as she welcomes her ex-lover "down to the water's edge" to "cast away those doubts", spilling out "the contents of her head" during the depression stage, and then crumpling to the floor repeating the phrase, "You don't know how I feel" as acceptance sets in. This was the song that you put on repeat to cope with that awful breakup because in every syllable she sings, you can hear that Lennox has been there too and feels just as bad as you do."

Lennox in her "Diva" atire in the music video

== Music video ==
The accompanying music video for the song was directed by British director Sophie Muller and was filmed in Venice, Italy during the shoot for the Diva album cover. The video shows Lennox sitting in a dressing room in front of a Hollywood style vanity mirror, initially bare-faced and dressed in undergarments, preparing to apply her stage make-up and costume as she transforms herself into a diva. By the middle of the video, Lennox is fully made up and in the costume she wears on the Diva album cover. The rest of the video consists of Lennox posing for the cameras alternating with shots of her singing the song. The video was the first track on Lennox's Diva video album, directed entirely by Muller, which showcased Lennox performing songs from the album in a variety of diva-esque costumes and situations.

The music video for "Why" was credited for its portrayal of vulnerability. Sleek Magazine commented that the video showcases "that a fully-fledged showgirl costume with stage make-up can be just as vulnerable as being bare-faced in an old track suit". They ranked the music video for "Why" as the fifth best music video by Annie Lennox of all time. The video won the MTV Video Music Award for Best Female Video at the 1992 MTV Video Music Awards. It was later published on YouTube in October 2009 and by October 2026, the video had received more than 117 million views.

== Track listings ==
7-inch single

| No. | Title | Length |
|---|---|---|
| 1. | "Why" (Single Version) | 4:53 |
| 2. | "Primitive" | 4:17 |

CD maxi

| No. | Title | Length |
|---|---|---|
| 1. | "Why" (Single Version) | 4:53 |
| 2. | "Primitive" | 4:20 |
| 3. | "Why" (Instrumental) | 4:54 |

== Charts ==
=== Weekly charts ===
| Chart (1992) | Peak position |
|---|---|
| Australia (ARIA) | 17 |
| Austria (Ö3 Austria Top 40) | 11 |
| Belgium (Ultratop 50 Flanders) | 4 |
| Canada Top Singles (RPM) | 7 |
| Canada Adult Contemporary (RPM) | 3 |
| Denmark (IFPI) | 9 |
| Europe (Eurochart Hot 100) | 3 |
| Europe (European Hit Radio) | 1 |
| Germany (GfK) | 12 |
| Ireland (IRMA) | 5 |
| Italy (Musica e dischi) | 1 |
| Netherlands (Dutch Top 40) | 6 |
| Netherlands (Single Top 100) | 8 |
| New Zealand (Recorded Music NZ) | 15 |
| Norway (VG-lista) | 6 |
| Spain (AFYVE) | 11 |
| Sweden (Sverigetopplistan) | 10 |
| Switzerland (Schweizer Hitparade) | 6 |
| UK Singles (Official Charts) | 5 |
| UK Airplay (Music Week) | 1 |
| US Billboard Hot 100 | 34 |
| US Adult Contemporary (Billboard) | 6 |
| US Alternative Airplay (Billboard) | 12 |
| US Cash Box Top 100 | 23 |

| Chart (2008) | Peak position |
|---|---|
| Denmark (Tracklisten) | 6 |

=== Year-end charts ===
| Chart (1992) | Position |
|---|---|
| Belgium (Ultratop) | 52 |
| Canada Top Singles (RPM) | 41 |
| Canada Adult Contemporary (RPM) | 18 |
| Europe (Eurochart Hot 100) | 33 |
| Europe (European Hit Radio) | 12 |
| Germany (Media Control) | 70 |
| Netherlands (Dutch Top 40) | 50 |
| Netherlands (Single Top 100) | 97 |
| Sweden (Topplistan) | 62 |
| Switzerland (Schweizer Hitparade) | 21 |
| UK Singles (OCC) | 79 |
| UK Airplay (Music Week) | 23 |
| US Adult Contemporary (Billboard) | 40 |

== Certifications ==
| Region | Certification | Certified units/sales |
|---|---|---|
| New Zealand (RMNZ) | Gold | 15,000^{‡} |
| United Kingdom (BPI) | Silver | 200,000^{‡} |
^{‡} Sales+streaming figures based on certification alone.

== Release history ==
| Region | Date | Format(s) | Label(s) | Ref. |
|---|---|---|---|---|
| United Kingdom | 16 March 1992 | 7-inch vinyl; 12-inch vinyl; CD; cassette | RCA | |
| Australia | 23 March 1992 | CD; cassette | RCA | |
| Japan | 21 April 1992 | Mini-CD | RCA | |

== DJ Sammy version ==
"Why"

Single by DJ Sammy

from the album The Rise
- Released: June 2005
- Length: 4:00
- Label: Ministry of Sound; Data
- Songwriter: Annie Lennox
- Producers: Martin Eyerer; Oliver Laib

DJ Sammy singles chronology
| "Rise Again" (2004) | "Why" (2005) | "L'bby Haba" (2006) |

In 2005 Spanish producer DJ Sammy covered "Why" with vocals from German singer Britta Medeiros. "Why" is the second single from the album The Rise. The music video features DJ Sammy in a room with a mixboard that he uses to create three holographic women that sing the song.

=== Track listings ===
US CD single

1. "Why" (Radio Edit) – 4:00
2. "Why" (Candlelight Mix) – 4:25
3. "Why" (Extended Mix) – 6:44
4. "Why" (Phunk Investigation Remix) – 5:55
5. "Why" (Breeze & Styles Remix) – 6:17
6. "Why" (DJ Sammy's Extended Mix) – 7:10
7. "Why" (Parker & Hanson Remix) – 7:58
8. "Why" (Andrew McCensit Remix) – 7:58
9. "Why" (Phunk Investigation Dub) – 9:21

Germany CD single

1. "Why" (Radio Edit)
2. "Why" (Sammy Extended)
3. "Why" (Parker & Hanson Remix)
4. "Cheba"

Australia CD single

1. "Why" (Radio Edit)
2. "Why" (Club Mix)
3. "Why" (Sammy's Extended Mix)
4. "Why" (Parker & Hanson Mix)

UK CD single

1. "Why" (Radio Edit) – 3:28
2. "Why" (Club Mix) – 6:43
3. "Why" (Breeze & Styles Remix) – 6:19
4. "Why" (Phunk Investigation Remix) – 5:55
5. "Why" (Parker & Hanson Mix) – 8:46
6. "Why" music video

=== Charts ===
==== Weekly charts ====
| Chart (2005) | Peak position |
|---|---|
| Australia (ARIA) | 29 |
| Germany (GfK) | 64 |
| Hungary (Dance Top 40) | 38 |
| Ireland (IRMA) | 16 |
| Ireland Dance (IRMA) | 5 |
| Scottish Singles Sales (Official Charts) | 2 |
| UK Singles (Official Charts) | 7 |
| US Dance Radio Airplay (Billboard) | 6 |
| US Dance Singles Sales (Billboard) | 10 |

==== Year-end charts ====
| Chart (2005) | Position |
|---|---|
| US Dance Radio Airplay (Billboard) | 44 |

== Together for Palestine version ==
In 2025, Lennox recorded a new version of the song entitled "Why? - For Gaza" for the Together for Palestine benefit concert. The version contains new lyrics referencing the Gaza war. The new version was released as a single with proceeds going to Palestinian charities.
