= It's Alright (Baby's Coming Back) =

Single by Eurythmics

from the album Be Yourself Tonight
- B-side: "Tous les garçons et les filles"
- Released: 30 December 1985
- Recorded: 1985
- Genre: Synth-pop
- Length: 3:45
- Label: RCA
- Songwriters: Annie Lennox; David A. Stewart
- Producer: David A. Stewart

Eurythmics singles chronology
"Sisters Are Doin' It for Themselves" (1985)	"It's Alright (Baby's Coming Back)" (1985)	"When Tomorrow Comes" (1986)

Music video
- "It's Alright (Baby's Coming Back)" on YouTube

"It's Alright (Baby's Coming Back)" is a song written and recorded by the British pop music duo Eurythmics. It was released as the fourth and final single from their 1985 album Be Yourself Tonight. The song was produced by Dave Stewart, and the song's brass arrangement was devised by Michael Kamen.

The single became Eurythmics' tenth Top 20 hit in the UK where it peaked at number 12, but was less successful in the United States, stalling at number 78 on the Billboard Hot 100. As songwriters, Annie Lennox and Dave Stewart received the 1986 Ivor Novello award for Best Song Musically and Lyrically.

== Composition ==
The song is a blend of R&B and electronica in the key of D♭ Major, with a tempo of 93 beats per minute. The intro and chorus repeats the chords D♭ Major, C♭ Major, G♭ Major and F♭ Major over a bass pedal point of D♭, while the bridge remains on E♭ minor throughout. The melody of the first line of the lyrics (It's alright, Baby's Coming Back) is identical to the introductory riff of "The Tears of a Clown" by Smokey Robinson and the Miracles.

== Reception ==
Upon its release, Andy Hurt of Sounds wrote, "While the charts overflow with detritus, Eurythmics sail serenely on. Annie shows she's picked up a few tips from Aretha while Dave lifts his glissando solo direct from Holger Czukay's 'Persian Love'." In the US, Cash Box said it "carries on the soul groove of earlier outings." Billboard referred to "It's Alright (Baby's Coming Back)" as the band's "typical sleight-of-hand" with its "ornate overlapping themes".

== Music video ==
The song's music video, directed by Willy Smax, is a combination of live shots and computer animation, an innovative look for a music video in the mid-1980s. The video depicts a story in which Annie Lennox is in a car accident at the beginning of the video and her partner, portrayed by Dave Stewart, is so connected to her that he can instantly tell that something is wrong and immediately travels from the Orient to get to her. She is seen lying in a hospital bed with a heart monitor in the background. She performs the song as an out of body experience. The main focus of the video is Stewart's race to get to Lennox's side, which he finally does by the end of the video. When he opens the door to her hospital room, her eyes instantly pop wide open and the two embrace and then turn into pieces of abstract animation.

== Track listing ==
7"

- A: "It's Alright (Baby's Coming Back)" (LP version) – 3:50
- B: "Conditioned Soul" (LP version) – 4:32

12"

- A: "It's Alright (Baby's Coming Back)" (LP version) – 3:50
- B1: "Conditioned Soul" (LP version) – 4:32
- B2: "Tous les garçons et les filles" (non-LP track) – 3:29

== Personnel ==
Eurythmics

- Annie Lennox – vocals, keyboard sequencers
- David A. Stewart – guitars, sequencers

Additional personnel

- Dean Garcia – bass guitar
- Olle Romo – drums
- Dave Plews – trumpet
- Martin Dobson – saxophones
- Michael Kamen – brass arrangement idea

== Charts ==
Chart performance for "It's Alright (Baby's Coming Back)"
Chart (1986)	Peak position
Australia (Kent Music Report)	32
Austria (Ö3 Austria Top 40)	14
Belgium (Ultratop 50 Flanders)	26
Canada Top Singles (RPM)	37
Europe (European Hot 100 Singles)	14
Ireland (IRMA)	8
Netherlands (Dutch Top 40)	20
Netherlands (Single Top 100)	21
New Zealand (Recorded Music NZ)	18
Switzerland (Schweizer Hitparade)	23
UK Singles (Official Charts)	12
US Billboard Hot 100	78
US Cash Box Top 100 Singles	79
West Germany (GfK)	22
