= The Church Studios =

Recording studio in London, England

Coordinates: 51.5775°N 0.1237°W

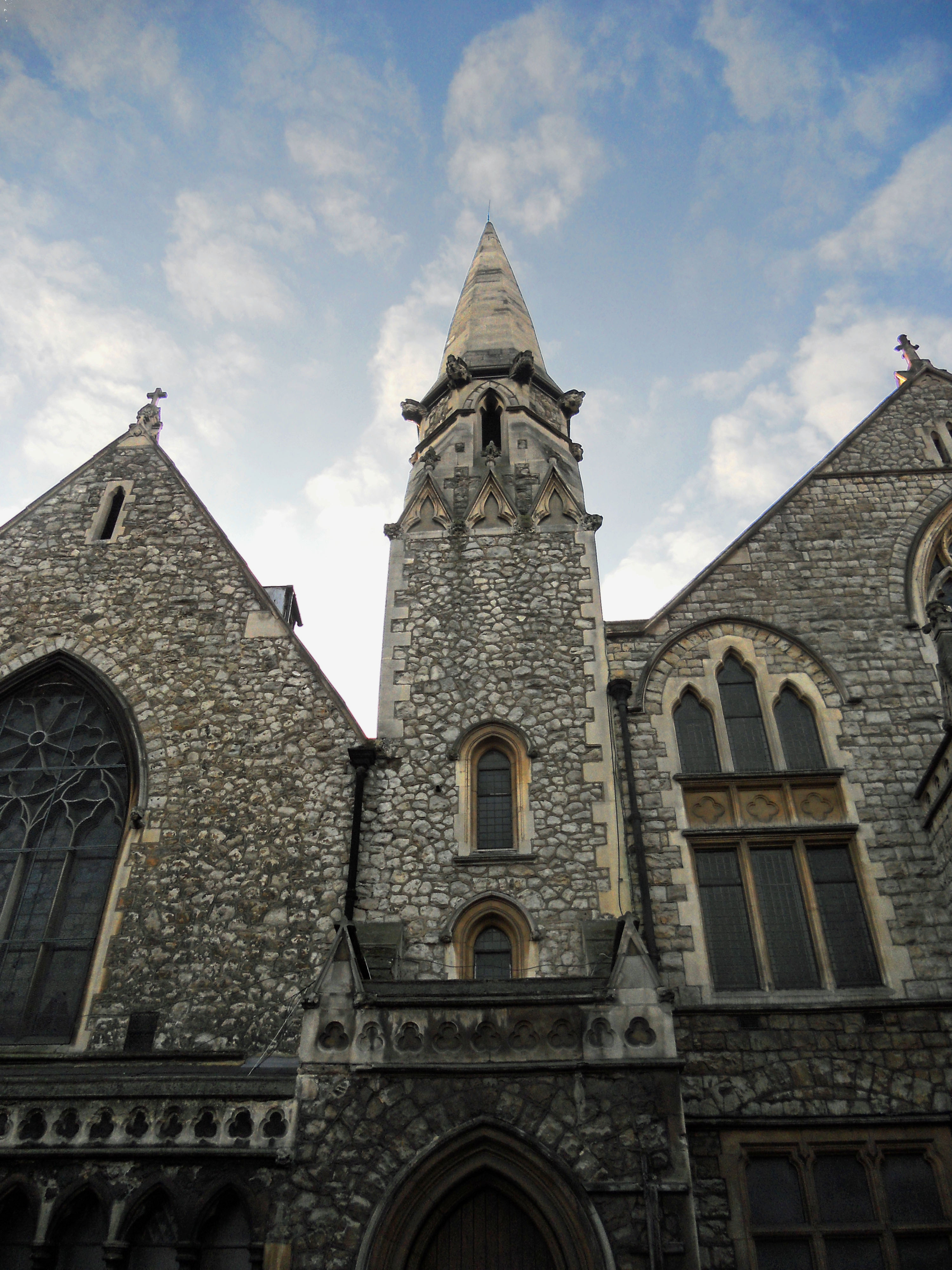
- The Church Studios in July 2012
- Type: Recording studio
- Industry: Music
- Area served: London, England
- Owner: Paul Epworth
- Website: thechurchstudios.com

The Church Studios is a recording studio located in a former church in Crouch End, North London, England. It was rented and then owned by Dave Stewart in the 1980s and 1990s, and was used to record Eurythmics' second album Sweet Dreams (Are Made of This) (1983). David Gray acquired it in 2004 before British record producer Paul Epworth bought and refurbished the studio in 2013. It has since been used by artists such as Adele, Beyoncé, Radiohead, Mumford & Sons, Coldplay and Madonna.

== History ==
It was built in the 1850s and served solely for religious purposes for the Agapemonite sect until the middle of the 20th century. As a result of the social changes that took part in the second half of the 20th century, the building became desired within the creative industries. It was eventually split in two halves; one continuing as a traditional church, the other a creative studio that has been through a number of ventures since the 1980s.

In the beginning of the 1980s, animators Bob Bura and John Hardwick bought the building. In 1982 they rented out the church room upstairs to Dave Stewart and Annie Lennox of Eurythmics. Stewart and Lennox converted the room into a recording studio and used it to complete their second album Sweet Dreams (Are Made of This) (1983). As the popularity and success of the Eurythmics increased, they purchased the building from Bura and Hardwick and recorded much of their catalogue there. Various artists have recorded at the studio, including Bob Dylan, Radiohead, Elvis Costello, Depeche Mode.

In 2004, the singer-songwriter David Gray acquired the studio. Gray recorded four of his studio albums at the Church Studios: Life in Slow Motion, Draw the Line, Foundling and Mutineers. He also welcomed other artists, including Bombay Bicycle Club and Kaiser Chiefs, to use the studio. Gray's ownership lasted for almost a decade, however due to the decline of record sales changing the landscape of the music industry, Gray decided to move on and the studio became under threat of falling into the hands of property developers. Eventually music producer Paul Epworth, who was looking for a studio facility of his own, bought the studio and took it over in October 2013.

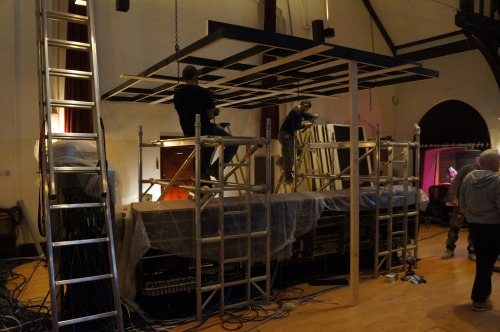
The 2013 refurbishment

With the help of the Walters-Storyk Design Group and Miloco Builds, Epworth transformed the Church Studios into a modern studio complex. While the top floor was left relatively untouched, the downstairs floors were completely refurbished to offer three studios: a large tracking room, an SSL studio and a writing suite. In the large tracking room he installed a 72 channel vintage EMI Neve console consisting of two halves: one from Abbey Road Studios and one from the Pathe Marconi Studios in Paris. The downstairs studio, featuring a vintage SSL console, had to be raised off the ground to deal with the high sound pressure levels, as a pair of custom Augspurger monitors were installed.

== Artists ==
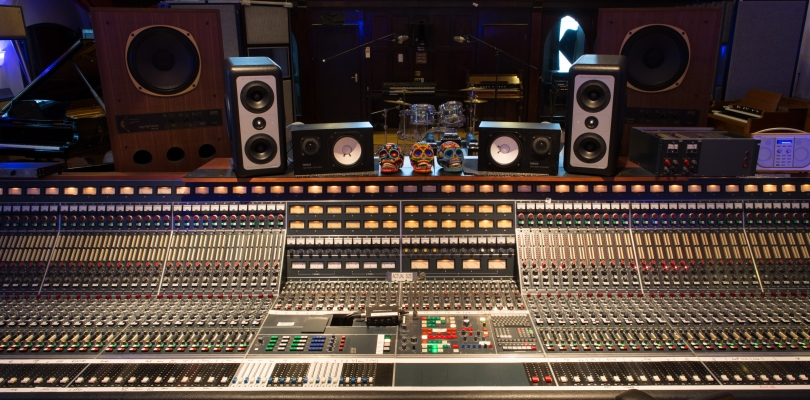
EMI console at the Church Studios

After the renovation of the studios, artists such as U2, London Grammar and Lana Del Rey have recorded in the studios. Adele filmed a live version of her song "When We Were Young" in the main studio in 2015, which has been watched more than 550 million times on YouTube. In 2018, Beyoncé and Jay-Z used the SSL studio to mix four of their songs, as well as cut vocals for another, on the Carters' first album Everything Is Love. Around the same time Mumford & Sons used the renovated studio complex to work with Paul Epworth on their album Delta. Madonna's fourteenth studio album Madame X, released in June 2019, was part recorded and mixed in its entirety in the SSL studio. Coldplay's eighth studio album Everyday Life was part recorded in the Neve studio in 2019.

Despite 2020 being a difficult year for music, the studios have managed to keep busy and host some of the finest musical acts around the UK. The 1975 have partially recorded their album Notes on a Conditional Form in the SSL studio in January 2020. That same summer, artists such as Slowthai, Arlo Parks and Birdy have used the Church to work on their albums.

In 2021, Dave released his second studio album We're All Alone in This Together, which was recorded in the SSL studio.

List of artists who have recorded, mixed or filmed at the Church Studios:

- Adele
- Alisha's Attic
- Alison Moyet
- Alt-J
- Arlo Parks
- Art School Girlfriend
- Beyoncé
- Beck
- Biffy Clyro
- Blur
- Bob Dylan
- Boo Radleys
- Bootsy Collins
- Curve
- Cast
- Coldplay
- The Corrs
- Culture Club
- Daryl Hall
- Dave
- Dave Stewart
- David Gray
- Del Amitri
- Depeche Mode
- Dido
- Ed O'Brien
- Elastica
- Erasure
- Elvis Costello
- Eurythmics
- Faithless
- Feeder
- Florence and the Machine
- Gabrielle
- George Clinton
- Glass Animals
- The Horrors
- Kaytranada
- The Kills
- Kylie Minogue
- Jack Peñate
- James Bay
- James Vincent McMorrow
- Jay-Z
- The Jesus and Mary Chain
- Jimmy Cliff
- Joe Strummer
- Jorja Smith
- Jungle (band)
- Lana Del Rey
- Laura White
- The Last Dinner Party
- LCD Soundsystem
- Lianne La Havas
- Lightning Seeds
- London Grammer
- Lorde
- Lou Reed
- Madonna
- Mike Dean
- Mick Jagger
- Mumford & Sons
- My Bloody Valentine
- Natalie Imbruglia
- Nick Cave and the Bad Seeds
- Oasis
- Patti Smith
- Paul McCartney
- Pet Shop Boys
- The Pop Group
- Radiohead
- Ride
- Robert Plant
- Royal Blood
- Rosie Lowe
- Ruth Lorenzo
- Seal
- Shakespears Sister
- Sinéad O'Connor
- Slowthai
- Sparklehorse
- Spiritualized
- The Stone Roses
- Stormzy
- The Streets
- Suede
- Swervedriver
- Swing Out Sister
- Terence Trent D'Arby
- Terry Hall
- Tom Jones
- Tom Petty and the Heartbreakers
- U2
- The Wildhearts
- The xx
- The 1975
