= Mayfair Studios =

Recording studio in London, England

Coordinates: 51.513507°N 0.150126°W

Mayfair Recording Studios was a recording studio in London, England, which was in operation from the 1960s until 2008.

== Background ==
The studio, located at 64 South Molton Street in the Mayfair area of the West End of London, was originally established in the late 1950s by jazz composer and saxophonist Johnny Dankworth as Ryemuse Studios. In 1968, a company called Spot Productions opened offices in the same building and began using the studio extensively, leading to the studio sometimes being referred to as Spot Studios. John Hudson worked there as the chief engineer, having joined the company from BBC Television, where he was involved in presentation, broadcasting live sound for programmes such as Colour Me Pop and Match of the Day. Throughout the early 1970s Hudson served as the engineer for numerous hit records produced at the studios.

== History ==
In 1971, Ryemuse/Spot officially changed its name to Mayfair Studios. In 1977, John Hudson and his wife Kate took over the management of the studio, and bought the company two years later. In 1980, faced with the impending sale of the studio's current location on South Molton Street, the Hudsons found a new site on Sharpleshall Street in the Primrose Hill district, to where they relocated the studio. The new studios were designed primarily by John Hudson, with input from other studio designers such as Eddie Veale and Ken Shearer, acoustic consultant for the Royal Albert Hall. Additionally, Jim Crockett of Crockett Associates calculated and planned the sound isolation for studio one and reception. Initially the new complex consisted of just two studios, but eventually grew to six studios over Mayfair's 30 years in business.

During the first week of Mayfair Studio's operation in its new location in April 1980, there were five records in the Music Week chart that had been recorded by Hudson at the studios' previous location. That success carried over to the new studio complex at Primrose Hill and was the beginning of a 30-year success story. The business eventually expanded to become a 12,000 sq ft (1,100 m^{2}) complex housing Mayfair's Studio 1, Studio 2 and Studio 3, as well as three writing/production rooms. These rooms were occupied by writers, producers and artists such as Matt Rowe (Spice Girls), the writing/production team of Robbie Williams/Guy Chambers, and Herbert Grönemeyer, a successful German singer, actor and composer. A long list of hit records were recorded by an array of producers and artists over the years.

The studios closed in December 2008. A book by Kate Hudson titled What’s Mayfair Got to Do With It? was written about the reasons for the closure. These included insurance companies not paying legitimate claims, plus lawyers and accountants not meeting responsibilities, with the net result being chaos.

Notable artists and musicians such as Orchestral Manoeuvres in the Dark, Bucks Fizz, Gary Glitter, Tina Turner, Cliff Richard, The Clash, Pink Floyd, Bee Gees, Blur, The Farm, Nigel Kennedy and Kroke, and The Smiths recorded music at Mayfair. A list of Mayfair's 30 years of hit records is available.
