= Hugh Leggatt =

British art dealer and patron

Sir Hugh Leggatt
- Born: 27 February 1925; London, England
- Died: 8 March 2014 (aged 89)
- Education: Eton College
- Alma mater: New College, Oxford
- Occupation: fine art dealer
- Spouses: Jennifer Hepworth (m. 1953; div. 1990); Caroline Tregoning (m. 1991)
- Parents: Henry Leggatt (father); Beatrice Grace Burton (mother)

Sir Hugh Frank John Leggatt (27 February 1925 – 8 March 2014) was a British art dealer and patron. He was the senior partner in the gallery Leggatt Brothers, and art dealer to members of the Royal Family, including Queen Mary, and Queen Elizabeth, the Queen Mother. Leggatt financed the National Portrait Gallery's commission of the first official portrait of Catherine, Princess of Wales.

== Early life ==
Leggatt was born on 27 February 1925 in London, England the son of art dealer Henry Leggatt. He was educated at Eton College before going up to New College, Oxford. From 1943 to 1946, Leggatt served in the Royal Air Force.

== Career ==
Following his service in the RAF, he joined the family firm Leggatt Brothers, founded in 1820 by one of Leggatt's ancestors. The firm were purveyors of fine art to several members of the Royal Family. At various times they held Royal Warrants of Appointment to King Edward VII, Queen Mary, King George V and Queen Elizabeth, the Queen Mother.

In 1988, Leggatt was honoured for his service to the fine arts, being elevated to the knighthood as a Knight Bachelor by Queen Elizabeth II.

Leggatt financed the commissioning of a portrait of Queen Elizabeth II for the National Portrait Gallery. The Queen chose Pietro Annigoni to paint the portrait. His painting Her Majesty in the Robes of the Order of the British Empire was considerably less popular than his first painting of the monarch, painted in 1955 for Fishmonger's Hall. The Queen, however, was said to have enjoyed the painting and later purchased one of Annigoni's studies for the painting for her private collection.

In 2011, Leggatt donated £100,000 to the Art Fund to cover the National Portrait Gallery's cost of commissioning the first official portrait of Catherine, Princess of Wales. The gallery engaged Paul Emsley who's painting Portrait of Catherine, Duchess of Cambridge was unveiled in 2013 to mixed reviews.

== Personal life ==
=== Marriage to Jennifer Hepworth ===
In 1953, Leggatt married, firstly, Jennifer Mary Hepworth (known as Lady Leggatt after her husbands elevation to the knighthood in 1988 and as Jennifer, Lady Leggatt from 1991). The marriage was dissolved in 1990. They had issue: two sons.

=== Marriage to Caroline Tregoning ===
In 1991, Leggatt married, secondly, the socialite and benefactor of public art galleries Caroline Gaynor Tregoning (known as Lady Leggatt after her marriage). Tregoning was born in 1938, a descendant of an English landed gentry family. She was the daughter of William Leonard Tregoning, later a senior official in the British Control Commission for Germany, and his wife Doris Mary Elwes Josselyn. Her sister, Judy Sophia Tregoning, married firstly Thomas Ernest Lane, grand nephew of Nobel Peace Prize laureate Sir Norman Angell, and secondly Sir Giles Floyd, 7th Baronet.

Lady Leggatt was a benefactor of public galleries, including the National Portrait Gallery and the Fitzwilliam Museum. In 1995, she donated funds to the Dulwich Picture Gallery for the maintenance and displaying of George Knapton's portrait of Lucy Ebberton.

Sir Hugh and Lady Leggatt's social circle included Princess Alexandra, Sir Angus Ogilvy, The Lord and Lady Kelvedon, and Sir Roy and Lady Strong.

On 7 December 2021, Lady Leggatt died at the age of 83.
