= Prince Philip, Duke of Edinburgh (Pietro Annigoni portrait) =

Two portraits of Prince Philip, painted between 1957 and 1972

Pietro Annigoni, Prince Philip, Duke of Edinburgh, 1957

Pietro Annigoni completed a portrait of Prince Philip, Duke of Edinburgh by 1957. He had previously completed portraits of other members of the British royal family, including Queen Elizabeth II and Princess Margaret. His portrait of Philip depicts him wearing the robes of the Order of the Thistle. Annigoni painted the portrait for the Worshipful Company of Fishmongers. It was exhibited at the Royal Academy Summer Exhibition of 1957 and subsequently hung opposite Annigoni's 1955 portrait of Elizabeth II at the Fishmongers' Hall but then moved to the landing as Philip reportedly did not like it. After the portrait went on display at the exhibition, Time wrote that the public was "stewing and snarling" about it, with critics commenting that the portrait makes him look "cold, aloof, almost arrogant." Annigoni responded by stating:" I painted him as I saw him. During the sitting he was severe; he showed a strong will, and he was definitely not a man of society."

In 1972, he completed a circular drawing of the Queen and the Duke of Edinburgh facing each other against a background of Windsor Castle to mark their silver wedding anniversary. The drawing was commissioned by the Library of Imperial History to be etched on commemorative silver and gold plates. Annigoni based the drawing on earlier sketches he had completed and the most recent official portraits which were sent to him.

== See also ==
- Pietro Annigoni's portraits of Elizabeth II
- Princess Margaret (Pietro Annigoni portrait)
