= Legate =

Legate may refer to:

== People ==
- Bartholomew Legate (1575–1611), English martyr
- Julie Anne Legate (born 1972), Canadian linguistics professor

== Political and religious offices ==
- Legatus, a higher-ranking general officer of the Roman army drawn from among the senatorial class
  - Legatus Augusti pro praetore, a provincial governor in the Roman Imperial period
- A member of a legation
- A representative, such as an ambassador, envoy, or delegate.
- Papal legate, a delegate messenger from the Holy See
- Legate (Star Trek), a rank in the Cardassian military in the fictional Star Trek universe
- Jiedushi, regional military governors in imperial China, sometimes translated as "legates"

== See also ==
- Leggatt (disambiguation)
- Legget
- Leggett (disambiguation)
