= Leggat (surname) =

Leggat is a surname from a group of related surnames all connected back to the Latin word legatus. It has been stated to be a Scottish variant of the surname Leggett. The name may have once referred to someone who worked as a legate or ambassador, especially one from the Papal States or for the papacy, or someone sent on a legation, becoming an occupational surname from Middle English. It also may have referred to someone who played the role of a foreign legate in a pageant. Other proposed origins exists, such as a diminutive of a personal name or as a locational surname.

Notable people with the surname include:

- Ashley Leggat (born 1986), Canadian actress
- Gordon Leggat (1926–1973), New Zealand cricketer and cricket administrator
- Graham Leggat (1934–2015), Scottish soccer player
- Ian Leggat (born 1930), New Zealand cricketer
- Richard Leggat (born 1960), New Zealand cricketer and public administrator

== See also ==
- Leggatt
- Leggatt (surname)
