= Portrait of an Artist =

Portrait of an Artist or Portrait of the Artist may refer to:

== Painting ==
- Portrait of the Artist, 1878 painting by Mary Cassatt
- Portrait of an Artist (Pool with Two Figures), 1972 painting by David Hockney

== Literature ==
- A Portrait of the Artist as a Young Man, 1916 novel by James Joyce
- Portrait of the Artist as a Young Dog, 1940 short stories collection by Dylan Thomas
- A Portrait of the Artist as Filipino, 1950 play by Nick Joaquin
- Portrait of an Artist, as an Old Man, 2000 novel by Joseph Heller
- A Portrait of the Scientist as a Young Woman: A Memoir, a 2022 book by Lindy Elkins-Tanton

== Music ==
- Portrait of the Artist (album), 1969 album by Bob Brookmeyer
- Portrait of an Artist (album), 1982 album by Joe Albany
- Astoria: Portrait of the Artist, 1990 album by Tony Bennett
- Portrait of the Artist as a Young Man: 1923-1934, 1994 boxset by Louis Armstrong

== Film ==
- A Portrait of the Artist as a Young Man, 1977 film by Joseph Strick
- Portrait of the Artist as a Young Bunny, 1980 American film
- Annigoni: Portrait of an Artist, 1995 documentary film
- Portrait of the Artist, 2014 French film by Bertrand Bonello
