= Leggatt =

Leggatt, or Leggat, may refer to:

== People ==
- Alison Leggatt (1904–1990), English character actress
- Francis Leggatt Chantrey (1781–1841), English sculptor of the Georgian era
- George Leggatt (born 1957), Lord Leggatt, Justice of the Supreme Court of the United Kingdom
- Gordon Leggat (1926–1973), New Zealand cricketer and cricket administrator
- Graham Leggat (1934–2015), Scottish international football player
- Herbert Leggatt (1868–1946), international rugby union player for Scotland in the 1890s
- Ian Leggat (born 1930), New Zealand cricketer
- Ian Leggatt (born 1965), Canadian professional golfer
- Richard Leggat (born 1960), New Zealand cricketer and public administrator
- Stuart Leggatt (1931–2002), Canadian politician and judge
- William Leggatt DSO (1894–1968), MC, Australian soldier, lawyer and politician

== Places ==
- Leggatt, Ontario, also known as East Luther-Grand Valley, a township in the Canadian province of Ontario
- Leggatt Island, part of the Great Barrier Reef Marine Park, the easternmost island in the Cole Islands group, Queensland, Australia

== See also ==
- Legate (disambiguation)
- Legget
- Leggett (disambiguation)
- Leggit
