= Leggatt (surname) =

Leggatt is a surname from a group of related surnames all connected back to the Latin word legatus. The name comes from Middle English, where it referred to someone who was an ambassador or representative. In addition to being an occupational surname, it may also have come from a nickname for someone who played the role of a legate in a pageant.

Notable people with the surname include:

- Alison Leggatt (1904–1990), English actress
- Andrew Leggatt (1930–2020), British judge
- Bill Leggatt (1900–1946), British military officer and cricketer
- Charles Fullbrook-Leggatt (1889–1972), British Army officer
- George Leggatt (born 1957), British Supreme Court justice
- Herbert Leggatt (1868–1945), British rugby player
- Hester Leggatt (1905–1995), British MI5 employee
- Hugh Leggatt (1925–2014), British art dealer
- Ian Leggatt (born 1965), Canadian golfer
- Logie Leggatt (1894–1917), English cricketer
- Robyn Leggatt (born 1957), Australian field hockey player
- Stuart Leggatt (1931–2002), Canadian politician and judge
- William Leggatt DSO (1894–1968), Australian soldier and politician

== See also ==
- Leggat (surname)
