= Pietro Annigoni's portraits of Elizabeth II =

Three portraits of Queen Elizabeth II, painted between 1954 and 1972

Pietro Annigoni, Queen Elizabeth II, 1955. Tempera, oil and ink on paper. Fishmongers' Hall, London.

Pietro Annigoni completed a number of portraits of Queen Elizabeth II between 1954 and 1972. In 1955, he painted her for the Worshipful Company of Fishmongers and in 1969 for the National Portrait Gallery. The two portraits were united for the National Portrait Gallery's exhibition; The Queen: Art and Image, held to mark the Diamond Jubilee of Queen Elizabeth II in 2012. In 1972, Annigoni completed a circular drawing of the Queen and Prince Philip, Duke of Edinburgh to mark their silver wedding anniversary.

The 1955 portrait was popular with the public and liked by the Queen but criticised for its romantic treatment and for prioritising Elizabeth's role as the monarch over insights into her inner life. The 1969 portrait continued the theme of emphasising the Royal role by placing Elizabeth against a featureless background that symbolised her sole responsibility as monarch. It was unpopular with the public.

== 1955 portrait ==
The 1955 painting was commissioned by the City of London livery company, the Worshipful Company of Fishmongers. It was first displayed in 1955 and later loaned by the Fishmonger's Company in 1958 and 1986 before the National Portrait Gallery's 2012 exhibition. It is displayed at their livery hall, Fishmongers' Hall, adjacent to London Bridge.

It is a full-length portrait in tempera, oil and ink on paper on canvas. Wearing the robes of the Order of the Garter, Elizabeth stands in a pastoral landscape, inspired by a comment that she made to Annigoni of how much she liked to watch people and traffic from a window as a child. The National Portrait Gallery described the painting as showing Elizabeth "in a sylvan idyll yet outward looking and connected to her surroundings" and wrote that when first shown "it drew crowds said to be ten-deep with viewers fascinated by the portrait's idealised yet penetrating character". It was first displayed at the Royal Academy's Summer Exhibition and was shown alongside a recent portrait of Elizabeth by Simon Elwes.

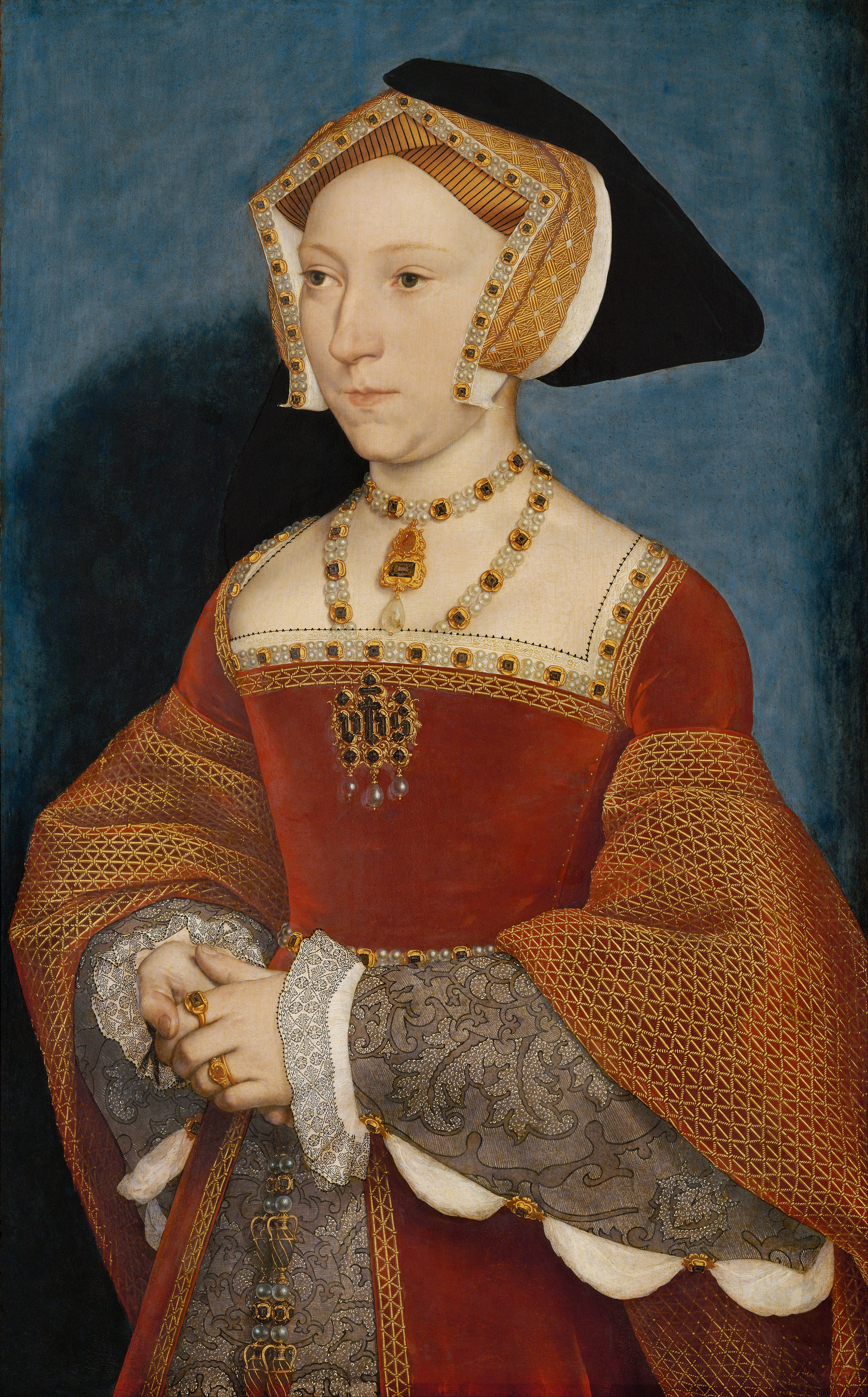
Hans Holbein the Younger, Portrait of Jane Seymour, c. 1537. Oil and tempera on oak. Kunsthistorisches Museum, Vienna.

The Times placed the portrait in the tradition of works that sacrificed "the reality of the monarch to the idea of the monarchy", saying that Annigoni had "managed to capture some of her Majesty's dignity and beauty. All he has failed to capture is her vitality". The paper compared the work unfavourably to Hans Holbein the Younger's portrait of Jane Seymour, in which they felt "the complexity of the detail creates a coherent and deliberate abstract pattern, which has a life and meaning of its own", transforming the sitter into a "more than human symbol", whereas with Annigoni "...there is no such purpose and eloquence in the actual marks on the canvas; something has been subtracted from reality, but nothing has been added".

In 1972, The Times reported that the 1955 portrait was "dismissed by some critics as romanticized and 'chocolate boxy', but the public liked it. The Queen, too, is known to have done so".

In a 2013 article for The Daily Telegraph on the difficulties of painting Elizabeth, Harry Wallop wrote that the 1955 portrait has subsequently been "deemed to be the most successful of all" as it "...makes no attempt to unearth the inner life of the young woman. She stands aloof, regal but none the less a beautiful 28-year-old. It is undoubtedly a portrait of a queen."

== 1969 portrait: Her Majesty in Robes of the British Empire ==
Pietro Annigoni, Her Majesty in Robes of the British Empire, 1969. Tempera grassa on paper on panel. 70" x 78" (198.1 x 177.8 cm). National Portrait Gallery, London.

The painting is a portrait in tempera grassa on paper on panel. Elizabeth is depicted wearing the red robes of the Order of the British Empire. 18 sittings were held over eight months between the Queen and Annigoni; the first eight sittings resulted in a large oil and pastel study that was later bought from Annigoni's family by Elizabeth in 2006. A photograph by Cecil Beaton in which Elizabeth wears the red Order of the British Empire robes has been considered as a source for the portrait.

The 1969 portrait was commissioned by the trustees of the National Portrait Gallery and funded by art dealer Hugh Leggatt. The style of the second painting stood in contrast to the first. It has been described as "stark and monumental" with Elizabeth "standing against an ambiguous, spare and gloomy, plain background", as opposed to the earlier "glamorous and romantic" portrait. Annigoni said of the second portrait of the Queen that he "did not want to paint her as a film star; I saw her as a monarch, alone in the problems of her responsibility".

Writing in the Oxford Dictionary of Art, Ian Chilvers felt that the 1969 portrait's "rather severe, school marmish image had a mixed reception" and was "much less popular" than the earlier portrait. The Times later described it as having "encountered more widespread hostility from public and critics" than the earlier painting, including a woman who threw a Bible at it when it was on display at the National Portrait Gallery where it was seen by 250,000 people.

== 1972 drawing of the Queen and the Duke of Edinburgh ==
In 1972, Annigoni completed a circular drawing of the Queen and the Duke of Edinburgh facing each other against a background of Windsor Castle to mark their silver wedding anniversary. The drawing was commissioned by the Library of Imperial History to be etched on commemorative silver and gold plates. Annigoni based the drawing on earlier sketches he had completed and the most recent official portraits which were sent to him.

== See also ==
- Prince Philip, Duke of Edinburgh (Pietro Annigoni portrait)
- Princess Margaret (Pietro Annigoni portrait)
