= Shellfish =

Culinary and fisheries term for exoskeleton-bearing aquatic invertebrates

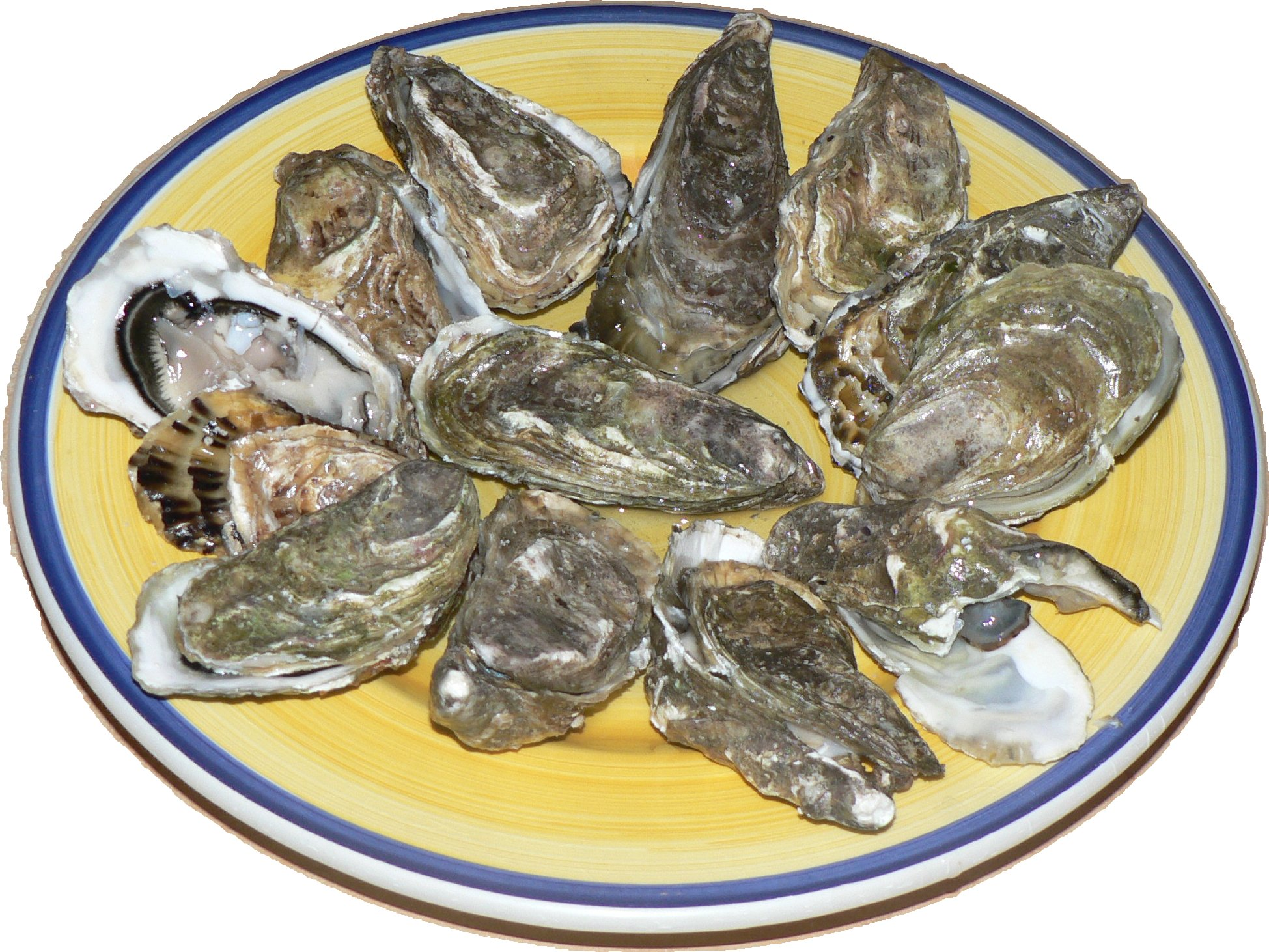
Raw oysters opened and presented on a plate

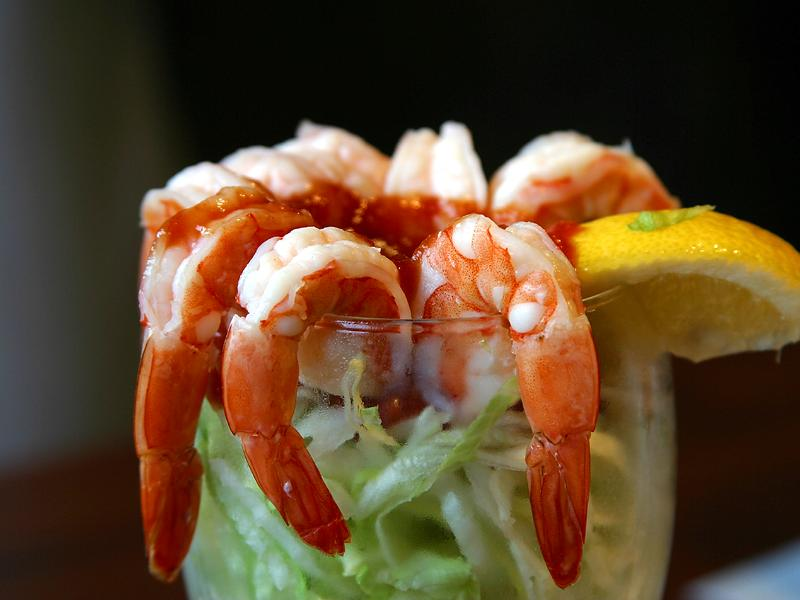
A shrimp cocktail

Shellfish, in colloquial and fisheries usage, are exoskeleton-bearing aquatic invertebrates used as food, including various species of molluscs, crustaceans, and echinoderms. Although most kinds of shellfish are harvested from saltwater environments, some are found in freshwater. In addition, a few species of land crabs are eaten, for example Cardisoma guanhumi in the Caribbean. Shellfish are among the most common food allergens.

Due to narrowing in the meaning of the English word fish over the centuries, shellfish no longer fall under what is usually considered fish. Most shellfish are low on the food chain and eat a diet composed mainly of phytoplankton and zooplankton. Many varieties of shellfish, and crustaceans in particular, are actually closely related to insects and arachnids. Crustaceans make up one of the main subphyla of the phylum Arthropoda. Molluscs include cephalopods (squids, octopuses, cuttlefish) and bivalves (clams, oysters), as well as gastropods (aquatic species like whelks and winkles; land species like snails and slugs).

Molluscs used as a food source by humans include many species of clams, mussels, oysters, winkles, and scallops. Some crustaceans that are typically eaten are shrimp, lobsters, crayfish, crabs and barnacles. Echinoderms are not as frequently harvested for food as molluscs and crustaceans. However, sea urchin gonads are quite popular in many parts of the world, where the live delicacy is harder to transport.

Though some shellfish harvesting has been unsustainable, and shrimp farming has been destructive in some parts of the world, shellfish farming can be important to environmental restoration, by developing reefs, filtering water and eating biomass.

== Terminology ==
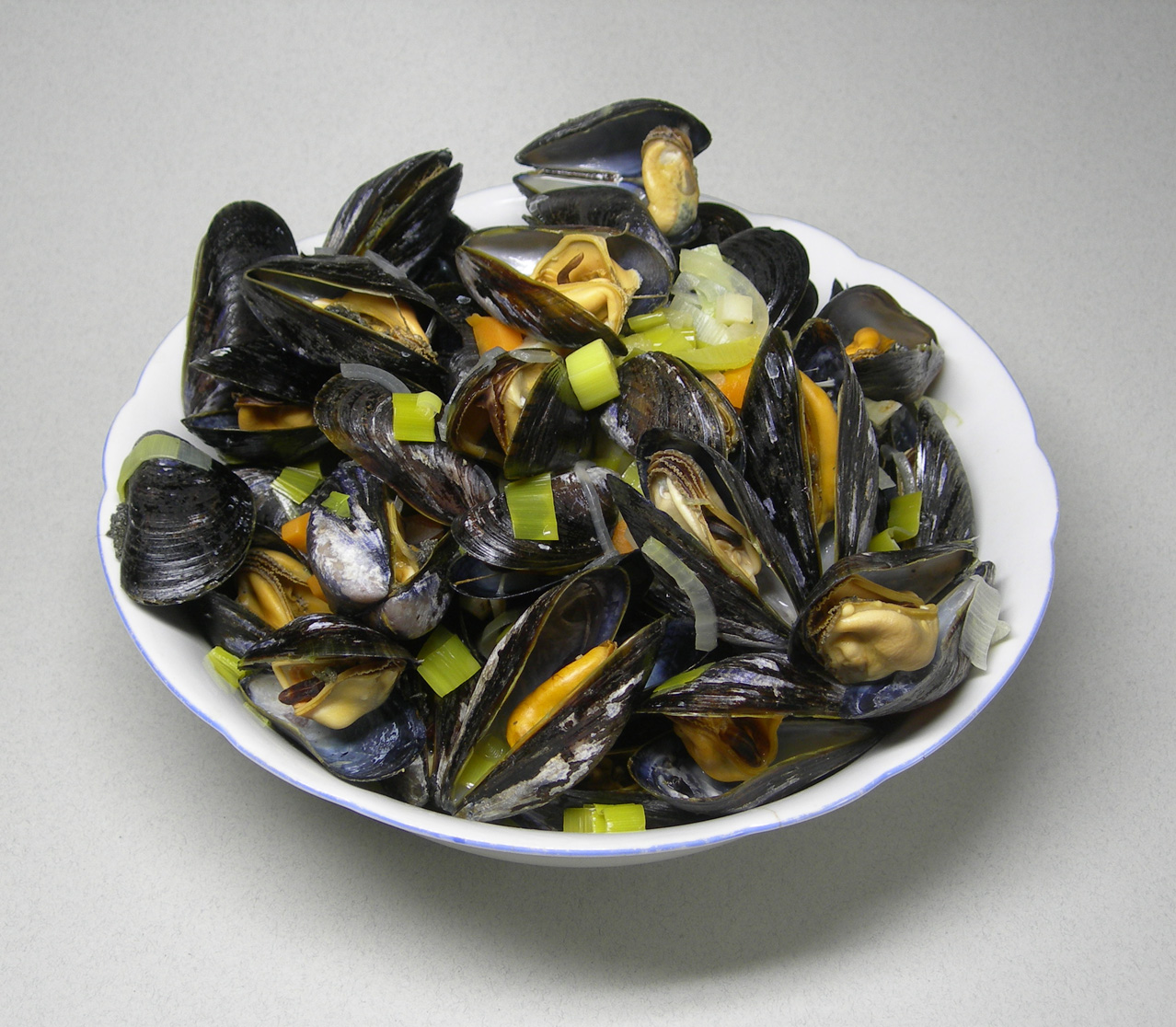
Cooked mussels

The term "shellfish" is used both broadly and specifically. In common parlance, as in "having shellfish for dinner", it can refer to anything from clams and oysters to lobster and shrimp. For regulatory purposes, it is often narrowly defined as filter-feeding molluscs such as clams, mussels, and oyster to the exclusion of crustaceans and all else.

Although the term is primarily applied to marine species, edible freshwater invertebrates such as crayfish and river mussels are also sometimes grouped under the umbrella term "shellfish".

Although their shells may differ, all shellfish are invertebrates. As non-mammalian animals that spend their entire lives in water they are "fish" in an informal sense. However, the term "finfish" is sometimes used to distinguish fish, animals defined by having vertebrae, from shellfish in modern terminology.

The word "shellfish" is both singular and plural; the rarely used "shellfishes" is sometimes employed to distinguish among various types of shellfish.

== Shellfish in various cuisines ==
Archaeological finds have shown that humans have been making use of shellfish as a food item for hundreds of thousands of years. In the present, shellfish dishes are a feature of almost every cuisine, providing an important source of protein in many cuisines around the world, especially in the countries with coastal areas.

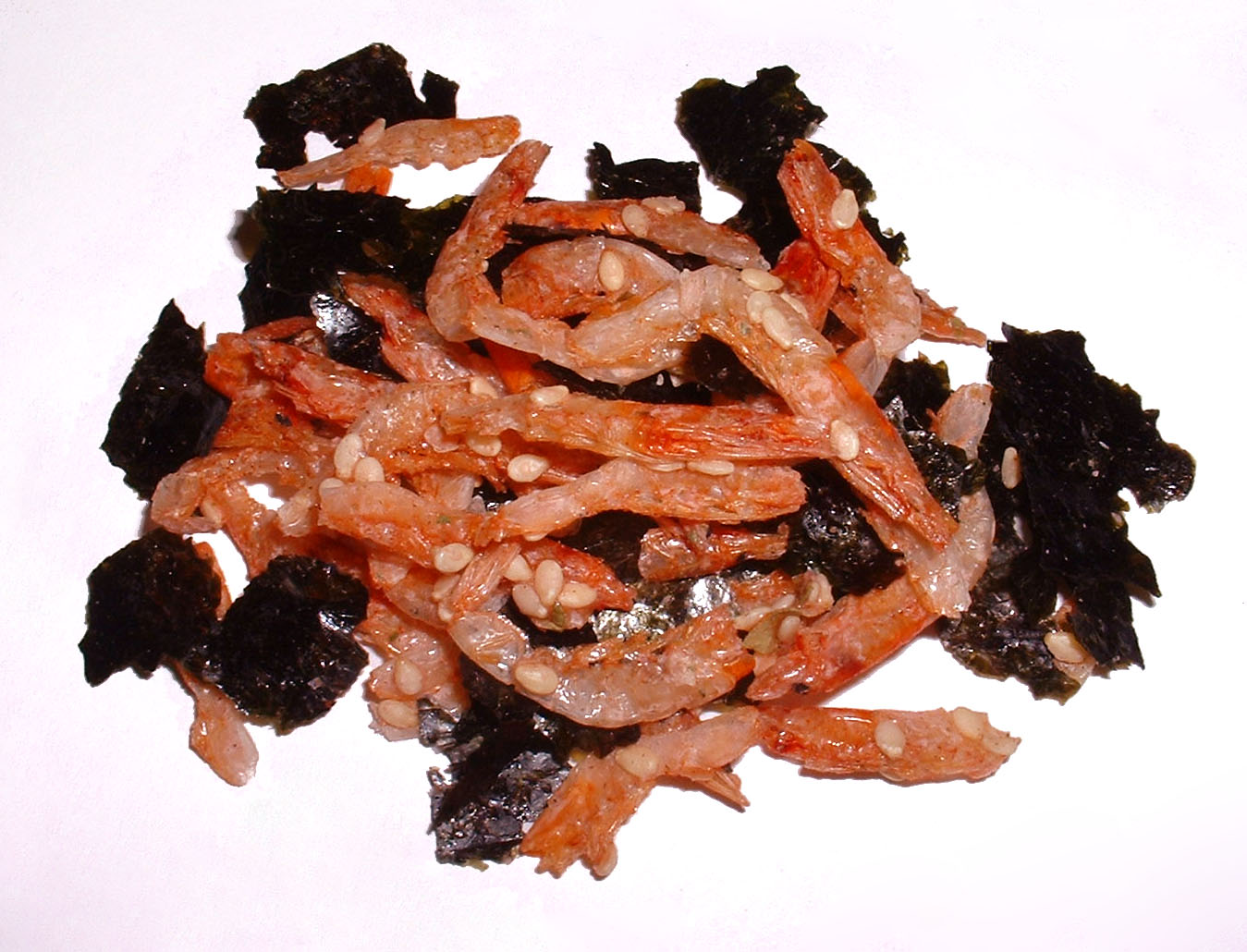
Sakura ebi ('cherry shrimp')

=== In Japan ===
In Japanese cuisine, chefs often use shellfish and their roe in different dishes. Sushi (vinegared rice, topped with other ingredients, including shellfish, fish, meat and vegetables) features both raw and cooked shellfish. Sashimi primarily consists of very fresh raw seafood, sliced into thin pieces. Both sushi and sashimi are served with soy sauce and wasabi paste (a Japanese horseradish root, a spice with extremely strong, hot flavor), thinly sliced pickled ginger root, and a simple garnish like shiso (a kitchen herb, member of the mint family) or finely shredded daikon radish, or both.

=== In the United States ===
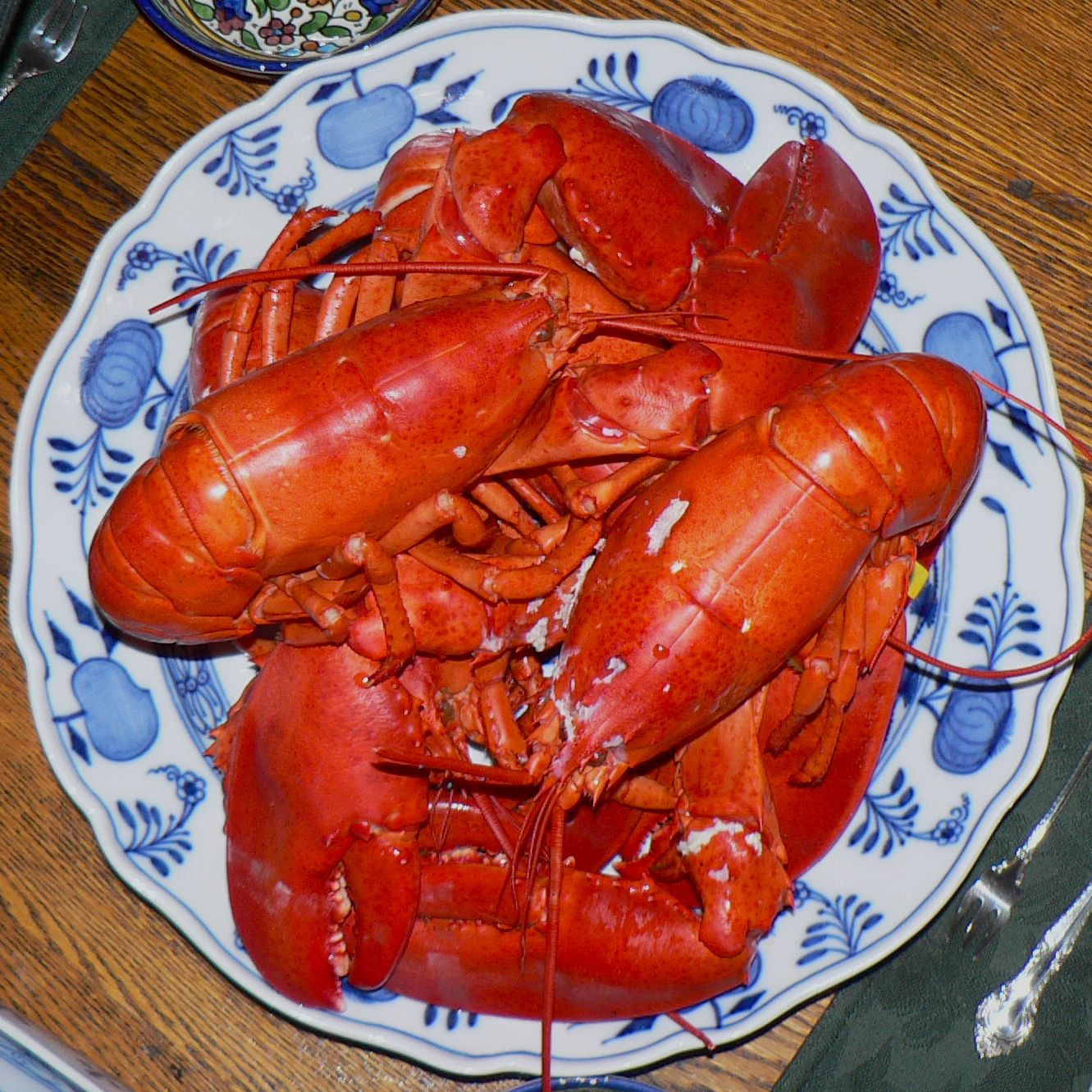
Boiled Maine lobster

Lobster in particular is a great delicacy in the United States, where families in the Northeast region make them into the centerpiece of a clam bake, usually for special occasions. Lobsters are eaten on much of the East Coast. The American lobster ranges from Newfoundland down to about the Carolinas, but is most often associated with Maine. A typical meal involves boiling the lobster with some slight seasoning and then serving it with drawn butter, baked potato, and corn on the cob.

Clamming is done both commercially and recreationally along the Northeast coastline of the US. Various type of clams are incorporated into the cuisine of New England. The soft-shelled clam is eaten either fried or steamed (and then called "steamers"). Many types of clams can be used for clam chowder, but the quahog, a hard shelled clam also known as a chowder clam, is often used because the long cooking time softens its tougher meat.

The Chesapeake Bay and Maryland region has generally been associated more with crabs, but in recent years, the area has been trying to reduce its catch of blue crabs, as wild populations have been depleted. This has not, however, stemmed the demand: Maryland-style crabcakes are still a well known treat in crabhouses all over the bay, though the catch now comes from points further south.

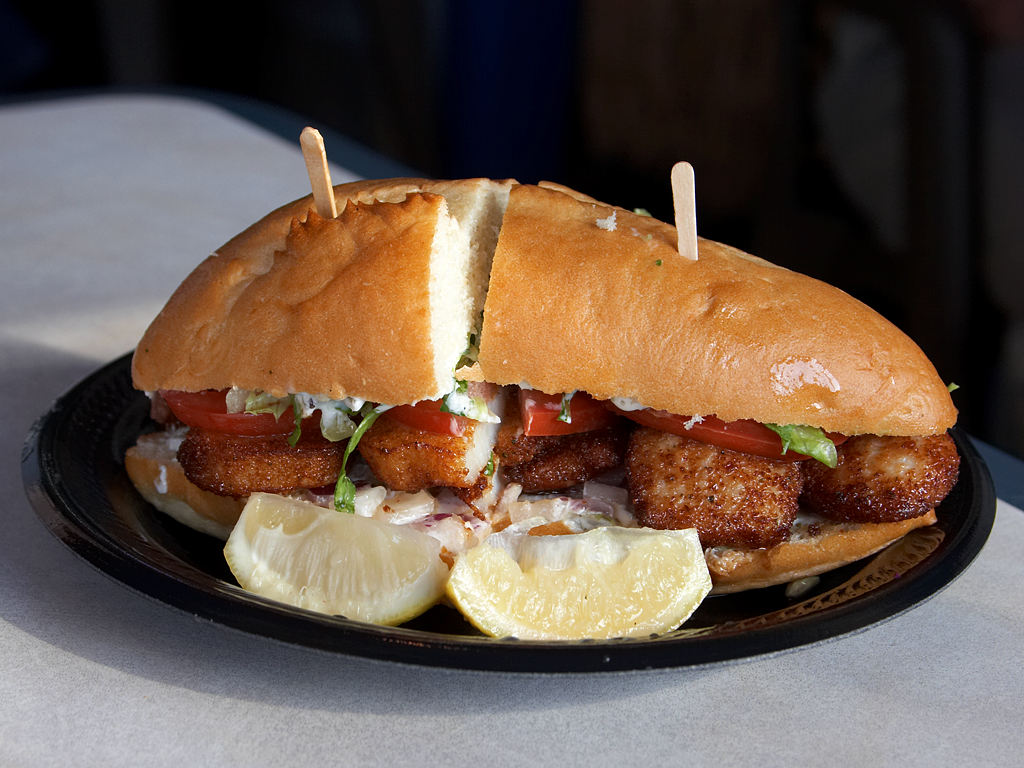
Scallop sandwich served in San Diego

In the Southeast, and also the gulf states, shrimping is an important industry. Copious amounts of shrimp are harvested each year in the Gulf of Mexico and the Atlantic Ocean to satisfy a national demand for shrimp. Locally, prawns and shrimp are often deep fried. In the Cajun and Creole kitchens of Louisiana, shrimp and prawns are a common addition to traditional recipes like jambalaya and certain stews. Crawfish are a well known and much eaten delicacy there, often boiled in huge pots and heavily spiced.

In many major cities with active fishing ports, raw oyster bars are also a feature of shellfish consumption. When served freshly shucked (opened) and iced, one may find a liquid inside the shell, called the liquor. Some believe that oysters have the properties of an aphrodisiac.

Inter-tidal herbivorous shellfish such as mussels and clams can help people reach a healthy balance of omega-3 and omega-6 fats in their diets, instead of the current Western diets. For this reason, the eating of shellfish is often encouraged by dietitians.

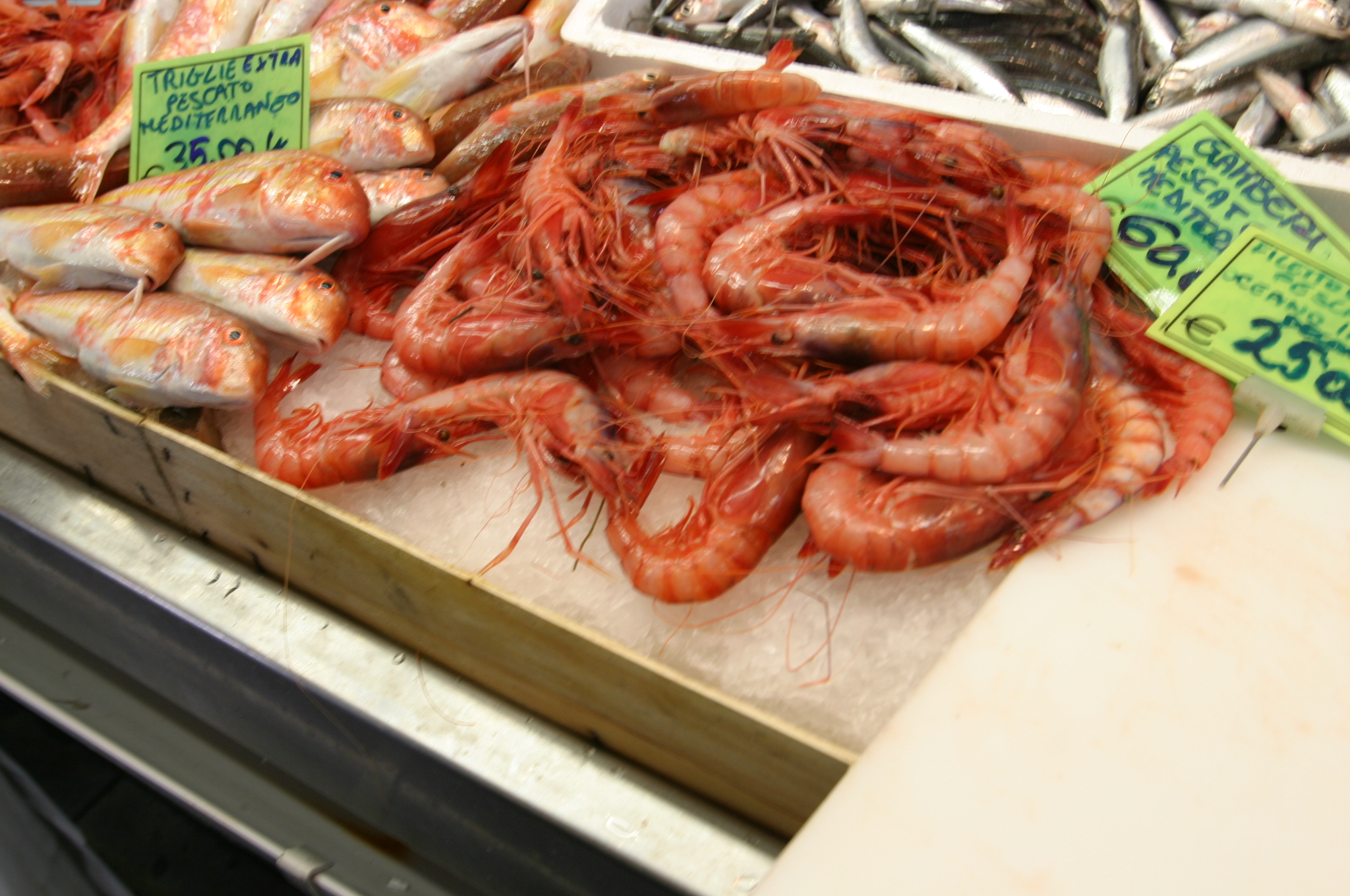
Large shrimp or prawns for sale in Italy

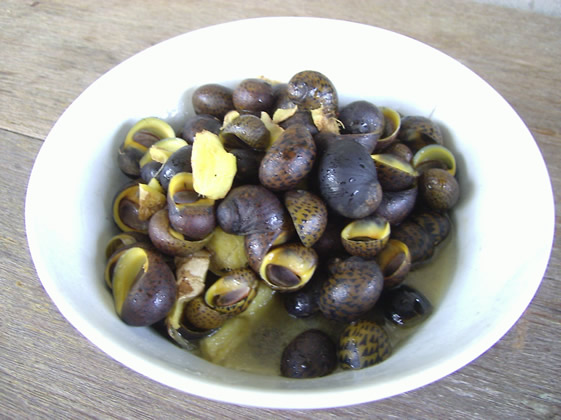
A dish of cooked freshwater nerites from the Rajang River, Sarawak, Malaysia

Some popular dishes using shellfish:

- Ceviche
- Cioppino
- Clam chowder
- Curanto
- Fruits de mer
- Paella
- Sashimi and sushi
- Shrimp cocktail
- Lobster bisque
- She-crab soup

== Religious dietary restrictions ==
The Torah forbids the consumption of shellfish (i.e. the only permitted seafood is fish with fins and scales), in the books of Leviticus and Deuteronomy. Jews (of all religious traditions) who observe the dietary laws thus do not eat shellfish, neither do Seventh-day Adventists, who also follow Jewish dietary law.

Shia Islamic schools of thought vary on whether (and which types of) shellfish may be acceptable. Sunni Muslims, except Hanafis, view them as halal.

== Allergy ==
Roughly 1% of the population is estimated to suffer from shellfish allergy, which is more common in teenage and adult life than early childhood.

There is some evidence that shellfish intolerance exists in an unknown proportion of the population. The symptoms of this do not include the immune and respiratory symptoms of an allergic reaction, such as hives, hyperventilation, or anaphylaxis, but do involve gastrointestinal distress, like nausea, abdominal cramps, and diarrhea. Similar symptoms can come from foodborne illness or as part of a toxic effect.

== Toxic content ==
Some shellfish, such as whelk, contain arsenic. A sample of whelk was found to have a total content of arsenic at 15.42 mg/kg of which 1% is inorganic arsenic.

Shellfish caught in Alaska can cause paralytic shellfish poisoning (PSP). PSP is caused by toxins, namely saxitoxin, released by dinoflagellates, a type of protista (also considered algae), which are extremely poisonous (1,000 times more potent than cyanide) and can lead to death by paralyzing the breathing muscles. Due to warming oceans, algae blooms have become more widespread, thereby increasing the likelihood of intoxications of various types.

== Ecosystem services and reef-building ==
Shellfish of various kinds contribute to the formation of reefs, such as when millions of oysters or mussels aggregate together. Reefs provide habitat for numerous other species, bury carbon, contributing to climate change mitigation, and defend the shore against erosion, floods and waves. Conversely, when they are destroyed or exploited, carbon can be released into the atmosphere, simultaneously increasing the likelihood of severe weather while removing the natural defence against its consequences. In addition, some shellfish are known for filtering water, removing suspended particles and contaminants, which contributes to both quality and clarity. These benefits cascade to other species that are helpful to humankind such as seagrasses.

== See also ==
- Aquaculture
- Seafood
- Seashell
- Shellfish Association of Great Britain (SAGB)
