= Princess Margaret (Pietro Annigoni portrait) =

Painting by Pietro Annigoni

Pietro Annigoni, Princess Margaret, 1957

Princess Margaret is a 1957 painting by the Italian artist Pietro Annigoni depicting Princess Margaret, the only sibling of Queen Elizabeth II.

The portrait shows Margaret against the backdrop of an English rose garden, which is a reference to her second name 'Rose'. She reportedly took part in 21–33 sittings for the portrait, beginning in 1956, with model Georgina Moore posing in Margaret's place in other sittings. Annigoni described Margaret as being "enveloped in an aura of sensuality". The painting originally hung in her private apartments at Kensington Palace and had been exhibited at the National Museum of Wales, in Cardiff, in 1977. It was reportedly a favorite of her sister, the Queen. The Wall Street Journal observed that despite Margaret being of average height, the portrait depicted her with the "long neck of a taller woman".

In June 2006 along with much of Margaret's estate it was auctioned by her children to pay the inheritance tax bill. It sold at the auction for £680,000, more than three times the original estimate, and it later emerged that Margaret's son Viscount Linley, was the anonymous buyer. He lent the portrait to the National Portrait Gallery where it went on display between September 2008 and March 2009.

In a satirical piece for The Guardian discussing the best and worst royal portraits, John Crace stated "this Botox thingy is simply marvellous."

== See also ==
- Pietro Annigoni's portraits of Elizabeth II
- Prince Philip, Duke of Edinburgh (Pietro Annigoni portrait)
