= Legget =

Legget is a surname, and may refer to:

== Communities ==
- Leggett, California, a town in California, USA
- Leggett, North Carolina, a town in North Carolina, USA

== People ==
- Archie Legget, Scottish bass player
- Anthony Leggett (1938-2006), British–American theoretical physicist, a Nobel Laureate in Physics
- Charles Legget (born 1988), Scottish cricketer
- Robert Legget (1904-1994), British-born Canadian non-fiction writer and geologist

== Other ==
- Leggett, a former American department store chain, now part of Belk

== See also ==
- Legate (disambiguation)
- Leggatt
- Leggett (disambiguation)
- Legge
- Liggett (disambiguation)
