= Liggett =

Liggett may refer to:

== People ==
- Hunter Liggett (1857–1935), American general
- Jacob N. Liggett (1829–1912), Virginia politician
- Louis K. Liggett (1875–1946), founder of Rexall drug stores
- Myron T. Liggett (1930–2017), American folk sculptor
- Thomas Milton Liggett (1944–2020), American mathematician
- Phil Liggett (born 1943), English bicycling commentator
- Walter Liggett (1886–1935), American journalist

== Places ==
- Liggett, Indiana, an unincorporated community in Vigo County
- Liggett, Colorado, an unincorporated community in Boulder County
- Liggett Lake, a small reservoir in Union County, Ohio
  - Liggett Lake Dam, the dam that creates the lake

== Companies ==
- Liggett Group, tobacco company
- Liggett's, company-owned (non-franchised) drugstores of the United Drug Company

== Education ==
- University Liggett School
