= Leggett =

Leggett may refer to:

== Places ==
- Leggett, California, town
- Leggett, North Carolina, town
- Leggett, Texas, town

== Other uses ==
- Leggett (surname)
- Leggett's, a former upscale department store chain; now part of Belk
- Leggett & Platt, a manufacturing company
- Francis H. Leggett, a ship commissioned in 1903
- Leggett inequality, in quantum theory

== See also ==
- Legget
- Legge
- Leggatt (disambiguation)
- Liggett (disambiguation)
