= Julie Anne Legate =

Canadian linguist

- Education: York University (B.A.); University of Toronto (M.A.); Massachusetts Institute of Technology (Ph.D.)
- Occupations: Linguist; professor

Julie Anne Legate (born 1972) is a professor in the department of linguistics at the University of Pennsylvania.

== Education and research ==
Legate earned her B.A. from York University in 1995 and her M.A. from the University of Toronto in 1997. She received her Ph.D. from the Massachusetts Institute of Technology in 2002, writing a dissertation on the Warlpiri language, under the supervision of Noam Chomsky and Sabine Iatridou.

She works in the areas of syntax and morphology. Her work investigates the structural representation of voice in syntax, beginning with a focus on Acehnese, a language spoken in Indonesia, but also including evidence from structures in Celtic, Scandinavian, and Slavic, broadening current cross-linguistic understanding of passive-like constructions.

== Honors ==
Since 2015 Legate has been editor-in-chief of the journal Natural Language and Linguistic Theory.

== Key publications ==
=== Articles and chapters ===
JA Legate and CD Yang. 2002. Empirical re-assessment of stimulus poverty arguments. The Linguistic Review 19, 151–162. https://doi.org/10.1515/tlir.19.1-2.151.

JA Legate. 2003. Some interface properties of the phase. Linguistic Inquiry 34(3), 506–516. JSTOR 4179245

Legate, J. A., & Yang, C. 2007. Morphosyntactic Learning and the Development of Tense. Language Acquisition 14(3), 315–344. JSTOR 20462495

JA Legate. 2008. Morphological and abstract case. Linguistic Inquiry 39, 55–101. JSTOR 40071421.

JA Legate. 2012. Subjects in Acehnese and the Nature of the Passive. Language 88(3), 495–525. https://doi.org/10.1353/lan.2012.0069

JA Legate, Faruk Akkus, Milena Sereikaite, Don Ringe. 2020. On Passives of Passives. Language 96, 771–818. doi:10.1353/lan.2020.0062

=== Books ===
JA Legate. 2014. Voice and v: Lessons from Acehnese. (Linguistic Inquiry Monographs). MIT Press.

https://doi.org/10.7551/mitpress/9780262028141.001.0001
