= Antonio Bueno =

Italian painter

- Born: 21 July 1918; Berlin, Kingdom of Prussia, German Empire
- Died: 26 September 1984 (aged 66); Fiesole, Tuscany, Italy
- Education: Modernist
- Known for: Painting
- Notable work: Rebus (1968) Le amiche (1969); Il pompiere e la modella (1977); Odalisca (1981); Donne al tavolo (1983) Eleonora da Toledo (1984)
- Movement: Contemporary
- Awards: St. Vincent Prize, Marzotto Prize, Fiorino Prize, Modigliani Prize
- Patrons: Edoardo Sanguineti, Piero Chiara, Mario Luzi

Antonio Bueno (21 July 1918 – 26 September 1984) was an Italian painter of Spanish origin. He acquired Italian citizenship in 1970. He was born in Berlin while his journalist father was posted there by the newspaper ABC of Madrid.

== Life and career ==
Bueno undertook art studies in Spain and Switzerland. In 1937, he was in Paris, where he exhibited at the Salon des Jeunes; then in 1940 with his brother Xavier, he moved to Italy. After a Post-Impressionist experience, immediately after World War II he joined the school of Armenian artist Gregorio Sciltian, painting trompe-l'œil work. With Pietro Annigoni and his own brother, Bueno took part in the "Pittori moderni della Realtà (Modern Painters of Reality)" group . A dynamic and restless experimenter, after these experiences he conducted in-depth research in genres: abstract painter in 1950–53 while working as secretary for the Numero magazine; neometaphysic painter with his clay pipe series in 1953–1957; verist; materiologic as a follower of Informale with a number of imprint forms in 1960–62; signaletic and pop in the middle of the 1960s; neodada and visual painter – all this as an eternal combinative play of subjects and materials.

Bueno's final affirmation occurred at the Venice Biennale of 1984, a few months before his death, when he was already gravely ill: he exhibited a series of magistral work that was highly acclaimed and undoubtedly represents the apex of his whole production.

== Exhibitions ==
(personal and collective)

1938

- Paris, Salon des Jeunes (graphique).

1941

- Milan, galleria Manzoni, con X. Bueno, catalogue by Pietro Annigoni.

1942

- Florence, galleria Botti, con X. Bueno.
- Milan, galleria Ranzini, con X.Bueno, catalogue by Pietro Annigoni.

1946

- Milan, galleria Barbaroux; catalogue by J. Sylvestre.

1947

- First Invitation to the VI Quadriennale of Rome.
- Milan, galleria Cairoli (I Pittori Moderni della Realtà).
- Florence, galleria Botti (I Pittori Moderni della Realtà).
- Milan, galleria de L'Illustrazione Italiana (I Pittori Moderni della Realtà).
- Milan, galleria Barbaroux, con X.Bueno; catalogue by J.Silvestre.

1948

- Rome, galleria La Margherita (I Pittori Moderni della Realtà).

1949

- Milan, galleria Ranzini.
- St.Vincent Prize.

1951

- First invitation to the Quadriennale of Turin.

1952

- Florence, galleria Numero.
- Florence, Palazzo Strozzi, 'Mezzo secolo d'arte Toscana' 1901-1950.

1953

- Venice, galleria Il Cavallino; catalogue by G. Chamorel.
- Turin, galleria La Bussola; catalogue by Edoardo Sanguineti

1954

- Valdagno, Marzotto Prize.

1955

- Rome, Marzotto Prize.
- Rome, VIII Quadriennale.
- Turin, Quadriennale.
- Milan, Biennale.

1956

- Rome, galleria L'Obelisco; catalogue by O. Vergani.
- Venice, XXVIII Biennale.

1957

- New York, World House Galleries (Italy), catalogue by A.R. Krakusin.
- Florence, Fiorino Prize.

1958

- New York, Sagittarius Art Gallery; catalogue by A. Cagli.
- Los Angeles, Lane Gallery; catalogue by Mario Praz.
- Livorno, Modigliani Prize.
- Milan, Giovani Artisti Italiani ("Il Giomo"); catalogue by M. Valsecchi.
- Venice, galleria Il Cavallino.

1959

- San Francisco, "Italy, three directions"; catalogue by G. Carandente.
- London, Arthur Jeffres Gallery; catalogue by Mario Praz.
- Rome, XIX Quadriennale.
- Turin, Quadriennale.

1960

- Prato, galleria Falsetti; catalogue by A. Busignani.

1961

- Florence, galleria L'Indiano; catalogue by M. Bergomi.
- Venice, galleria Il Canale; catalogue by A. Busignani.
- Florence, XII Fiorino Prize (gold medal)

1962

- Viareggio, galleria La Navicella; catalogue by F. Russoli.
- Florence, galleria Il Fiore (I Mostra monocroma); catalogue by M. Bergomi.

1963

- Bologna, galleria Il Cancello (II Mostra monocroma); catalogue by L.V. Masini.
- Florence, XIV Fiorino Prize (New Trends); presentation by L.V. Masini.
- Florence, galleria Il Quadrante; catalogue by V. Aguilera Cemi - L.V. Masini.
- Warsaw, Festival di Sopot; catalogue by L.V. Masini.
- Paris, Galerie Domec; catalogue by G.C. Argan.
- Rome, galleria Schneider; catalogue by F. Russoli.
- Florence, galleria L'Indiano; catalogue by M. Bergomi.
- Florence, Palazzo Strozzi, "La Nuova Figurazione"; catalogue by M. Bergomi - J.L. Ferrier.
- San Marino, Biennale di San Marino, "Oltre l'Informale"; catalogue by G.C. Argan.
- Paris, Galerie Domec (Cinq peintres de Florence); catalogue by G.C. Argan.
- Florence, galleria Quadrante (Technologica); catalogue by A. Bueno - G. Chiari - L. Pignotti.

1964

- Rimini, Florence, Ferrara, Reggio Emilia, Venice, "España Libre"; catalogue by G.C. Argan - J. Moreno Galvan -V. Aguilera Cerni.
- Reggio Emilia, Comune, "I Mostra di Poesia Visiva, Gruppo '63".
- Rome, galleria Numero; catalogue by Edoardo Sanguineti.

1965

- Genoa, galleria La Carabaga; catalogue by Edoardo Sanguineti.
- Livorno, galleria Giraldi; catalogue by Edoardo Sanguineti.
- Venice, galleria Numero; catalogue by C. Chiari - L. Pignotti.

1966

- Florence, galleria Santa Croce; catalogue by Edoardo Sanguineti.
- Naples, galleria Guida; catalogue by A. Bonito Oliva.

1967

- Florence, galleria Il Fiore; catalogue by L.V. Masini.
- Bologna, Circolo di Cultura.

1968

- Florence, galleria L'Indiano; catalogue by P. Santi.
- Montecatini, galleria Flori (Space as a Symbolic Form); catalogue by L.V. Masini.
- Venice, XXXIV Biennale; catalogue by Edoardo Sanguineti.
- Venice, galleria Numero; catalogue by L. Pignotti.
- Cortina d'Ampezzo, galleria Medea, con X.Bueno, catalogue by Edoardo Sanguineti.

1969

- Milan, galleria Blu (I Tarocchi).
- Scandicci, Palazzo Comunale; catalogue by S. Salvi.
- Florence, galleria Il Fiore; catalogue by L.V. Masini - Edoardo Sanguineti.
- Cortina d'Ampezzo, galleria Medea;
- La Spezia, galleria 2001; catalogue by T. Paloscia.

1970

- Florence, galleria L'Indiano; catalogue by L.V. Masini - Edoardo Sanguineti.
- Paris, Studio G 30; catalogue by B. Pingaud.

1971

- Florence, Accademia delle Arti del Disegno, catalogue by R.Monti.
- Florence, Galleria Santa Croce; catalogue by L. Alinari - A. Gatto.

1972

- Florence, galleria Menghelli; catalogue by U. Baldini.
- Montecatini, galleria Internazionale, catalogue by A. Gatto.

1973

- Florence, galleria Michaud; catalogue by G. Di Genova.
- New York, Kuhlik Gallery; catalogue by C.L. Ragghianti.
- Venice, galleria San Giorgio.

1974

- Cortina d'Ampezzo, galleria Medea; catalogue by P.C. Santini.

1975

- Fiesole, Azienda autonoma di soggiorno e turismo, (collective exhibition); catalogue by C. Marsan.
- Forte dei Marmi, galleria Selby; presentation by M. Carrà.
- Florence, galleria Michaud; catalogue by E. Migliorini.
- Milan, galleria Medea; catalogue by E. Migliorini.

1976

- Sassari, galleria l'Età dell'Acquario; catalogue by A. Gatto.
- Florence, galleria La Gradiva; catalogue by C. Marsan.

1977

- Basel, ART 1977.
- Arezzo, galleria Piero della Francesca; catalogue by R. Biasion.
- Florence, galleria 33; catalogue by G.A. Bertozzi.

1978

- Rome, galleria Toninelli.
- Florence, galleria Spagnoli; presentation by A. Bueno.
- Florence, Studio Inquadrature 33; catalogue by C.A. Bertozzi - F. De Poli.

1979

- Florence, Palazzo Vecchio, "Ab Ovo"; catalogue by F. Menna.
- Tavarnelle, galleria Dada; catalogue by E. Miccini.
- San Giovanni Valdarno, Casa di Masaccio; catalogue by F. Menna.
- Vicenza, Chiesa di San Giacomo, "I D'apres, 1939/1979"; catalogue by F. Menna.
- San Casciano, Centro Culturale Dedalus; catalogue by E.Miccini.
- Prato, galleria Metastasio (I D'apres, 1939/1979); catalogue by A. Sensini.
- Rome, Centro Morandi, "Stai al gioco?"
- Florence, galleria De Amicis (ABCD, Alinari, Bueno, Conti, De Poli).

1980

- Florence, galleria Menghelli (Exhibition of graphic works donated to the Uffizi).
- Venice, galleria Graziussi; catalogue by A. Del Guercio.
- Piacenza, VI Biennale Nazionale d'Arte Figurativa Cassa di Risparmio di Piacenza (Irony and Fabula).
- Florence, galleria La Piramide; catalogue by E.Miccini.

1981

- Florence, La Nuova Strozzina, Palazzo Strozzi, "Antologica 1936-1981"; catalogue by P. Santi.
- Viareggio, galleria Ferretti (D'apres Ingres); catalogue by R. Monti.
- La Spezia, galleria Vallardi.
- Ferrara, Studio d'Arte Melotti (Monochromes 1955-1981); catalogue by S. Salvi.

1982

- Bologna, galleria Forni; catalogue by F. Solmi.
- Milan, galleria Annunciata; catalogue by F. Menna.
- Viareggio, galleria Ferretti; catalogue by Mario Luzi.
- Florence, galleria La Piramide; catalogue by S. Salvi.
- Rieti, Palazzo Vescovile, 'Generazione anni Dieci', catalogue by G. Di Genova.

1983

- Prato, galleria Metastasio; catalogue by M. Fagiolo dell'Arco.
- Catania, galleria Arte Club; catalogue by F. Menna.
- Naples, galleria Apogeo; catalogue by F. Menna.
- Luino, Museo Civico.

1984

- Florence, Palazzo Vecchio, Sala d'Arme,"I Pittori Moderni della Realtà"; catalogue by M. Fagiolo dell'Arco.
- Venice, XLI Biennale.
- Ancona, galleria Gioacchini; catalogue by G. Di Genova.

1985

- Rome, galleria La Gradiva; catalogue by F. Solmi.
- Genoa, galleria Guidi; catalogue by F. Solmi.
- Florence, galleria Davanzati; catalogue by M. Venturoli.
- Ferrara, Studio d'Arte Melotti.

1986

- Massa Marittima, Pinacoteca Comunale; catalogue by E. Dalla Noce.
- Macerata, Chiesa di San Paolo; catalogue by E. Dalla Noce.
- Milan, galleria Il Cannocchiale; catalogue by E. Dalla Noce.
- Rome, galleria Eliseo; catalogue by C. Di Genova.

1987

- Rome, Museo Nazionale di Castel Sant'Angelo (anthologic exhibition); catalogue by E. Dalla Noce.

1988

- Montepulciano, Pinacoteca Comunale (anthologic exhibition); catalogue by E. Dalla Noce.
- Cortona, Palazzo Casali (anthologic exhibition); catalogue by E. Dalla Noce.
- Poggibonsi, Casa di Chiesino (anthologic exhibition); catalogue by P. Levi.
- Matera, galleria Albanese.

1989

- Rome, galleria Parametro.
- Fiesole, Palazzina Mangani (anthologic exhibition).
- Campiglia Marittima, Palazzo Pretorio.

1990

- Lugano, galleria Spagnoli; catalogue by Mario Luzi.
- Avellino, Centro Culturale L'Approdo.

1991

- Florence, galleria Spagnoli (anthologic exhibition).
- Mesola (Ferrara), Castello Estense, Portraiture. Portraits in Italian Art of '900 collettiva; catalogue by Vittorio Sgarbi.

1992

- Forte dei Marmi, galleria Faustini.
- Livorno, galleria Arte Quadri.
- Vigevano, galleria Ducale.
- Venice, Salone di Settembre, "I dipinti della XLI Biennale".
- Florence, S.I.A.C., Palazzo degli Affari (anthologic exhibition).

1994

- Milan, galleria Pace.
- Aosta, Palazzo Challand, Museo Archeologico(antologica); catalogue by P.Levi.
- Busto Arsizio, Fondazione Bandera per l'Arte,(antologica); catalogue by P.Levi.

1995

- Brescia, galleria Arte Capital.
- Courmaier (Aosta), galleria Arte Capital.

1996

- Monsummano Terme, Villa Renatico Martini, "Colloquio col visibile" (collective).
- Bologna, Spazio espositivo Telemarket.

1997

- Turin, Spazio SDA, "Giochi di figure", catalogue by P.Levi.
- Rome, Spazio espositivo Telemarket.

1998

- Poggio a Caiano, Villa Medicea, "Drawing in Tuscany, 1900-1945" (collettiva); catalogue by M. Pratesi e A. Scappini.

== Bibliography ==
- P. ANNIGONI, I fratelli Bueno, gall. Ranzini, Milan, 1942.
- A. DEL MASSA, Antonio Bueno, 'La Nazione', Florence, 1943.
- G. DE CHIRICO, Memorie della mia vita (I parte), Astrolabio, Rome, 1945.
- J. SYLVESTRE, Antonio Bueno, gall. Barbaroux, Milan, 1946.
- R. BIASION, I Pittori della Realtà, 'Il Dramma', Turin, 1950.
- L. CARLUCCIO, Antonio Bueno, 'La Gazzetta di Torino', Turin, 1953.
- L. BORGESE, Antonio Bueno, 'Il Corriere della Sera', Milan, 1954.
- S. GIANNELLI, La collezione Numero, Museo Civico, Pistoia, 1956.
- T. SAUVAGE, Pittura italiana del dopoguerra, ed. Schwarz, Milan, 1956.
- O. VERGANI, Antonio Bueno, gall. L'Obelisco, Rome, 1956.
- R. BIASION, Antonio Bueno, il pittore delle pipe, 'Oggi', Milan, ottobre 1957.
- A. FRANKFURTER, Antonio Bueno, 'Art News', New York, 1958.
- M. PRAZ, Antonio Bueno, Lane Gallery, Los Angeles, 1958.
- A. BUSIGNANI, Antonio Bueno, gall. Il Canale, Venice, 1960.
- M. PRAZ, Antonio Bueno, The Arthur Jeffress Gallery, Londra, 1960.
- CARLETTI-CAMESASCA, Enciclopedia dell'arte, Garzanti, Milan, 1960.
- C.L. RAGGHIANTI, La grande mostra di Antonio Bueno, 'La Nazione', Florence, April 1961.
- V.AGUILERA CERNI, Antonio Bueno, ed. gall. Il Quadrante, Florence, 1962.
- G.C. ARGAN, Cinq peintres de Florence, gall. Pierre Domec, Paris 1962.
- G. DE CHIRICO, Memorie della mia vita (II parte), ed. Rizzoli, Milan, 1962.
- E. SANGUINETI, Antonio Bueno, gall. Montenapoleone, Milan, 1962.
- G.C. ARGAN, Berti, Bueno, Loffredo, Moretti, Nativi, ed. gall. Il Quadrante, Florence, 1963.
- J. L. FERRIER - M. BERGOMI, La Nuova Figurazione, Palazzo Strozzi, ed.Vallecchi, Florence, 1963.
- L.V. MASINI, Antonio Bueno, itinerario di una nuova figurazione, ed. gall. Il Quadrante, Florence, 1963.
- L.V. MASINI, Nuove tendenze, XVI Premio Nazionale del Fiorino, Florence, 1963.
- L.V. MASINI, Grafica contemporanea, Internazional Festival of Sopot (Warsaw), 1963.
- E. SANGUINETI, La dialettica osmosi di Antonio Bueno, ed. gall. Il Quadrante, Florence, 1963.
- V. AGUILERA CERNI, Espana Libre, ed. Grafica Gattei, Rimini, 1964.
- G. CHIARI – L. PIGNOTTI, Homo technologicus di Antonio Bueno, gall. Numero, Venice, 1965.
- G. DORFLES, Antonio Bueno, gall.-libr. Guida, Naples, 1965.
- G. DORFLES, Cartella 70, ed. Sampietro, Bologna, 1965.
- G. DORFLES, A. Bueno, gall. Giraldi, Livorno, 1965.
- G. DORFLES, L'art contemporain en Italie, 'L'Œil', Paris, 1965.
- G. DORFLES, Antonio Bueno, ed. 70, Florence, 1966.
- L. PIGNOTTI, Antonio Bueno e Alberto Moretti, gall. Numero, Venice, 1966.
- E. SANGUINETI, Antonio Bueno, ed. gall. Santacroce, Florence, 1966.
- S. SAVIANE, Il premio Fata, 'L'Espresso', Rome, aprile 1966.
- R. CARRIERI, La raccolta Zavattini, ed. F.lli Pozzo, Turin, 1967.
- G. DORFLES, Antonio Bueno, 'D'Ars Agency', n. 35, Milan, 1967.
- U. BALDINI, Antonio Bueno alla Biennale, 'La Nazione', Florence, 1968.
- L. GONZALES ROBLES, Antonio Bueno, Bienal de Venecia, Venice, 1968.
- G. LONDEIX, L'inondation, Ed. Albin Michel, Paris, 1968.
- E. SANGUINETI, Musica Humana, carme per Antonio Bueno, Venice Biennale, Venice, 1968.
- T. PALOSCIA, Antonio Bueno, gall. 2001, La Spezia, 1969.
- B. PINGAUD - L. GOLDMAN, A. Bueno, peintures et gravures néopassatistes, Studio G 30, Paris, 1969.
- E. SANGUINETI, Antonio Bueno, gall. Jacopo della Quercia, Siena, 1969.
- C. BETOCCHI, Le carte di Antonio Bueno, ed. La Vecchia Farmacia, Forte dei Marmi, 1970.
- L.V. MASINI - E. SANGUINETI, Antonio Bueno, L'Indiano Ed., Florence, 1970.
- P. SANTI, Antonio Bueno, mostra antologica, gall. L'Indiano, Florence, 1970.
- L. ALINARI, A. Bueno (Taccuino per Antonio Bueno ), gall. Santacroce, Florence, 1971.
- A. GATTO, Antonio Bueno, gall. Il Catalogo, Salerno, 1971.
- A. GATTO - L. ALINARI, Antonio Bueno - Opere dal 1935 al 1971, gall. Santacroce, Florence, 1971.
- R. MONTI, Antonio Bueno, periodo 1959-1964, Accademia delle Arti del Disegno, Florence, 1971.
- U. BALDINI, La pittura di Antonio Bueno, gall. Menghelli, Florence, 1972.
- L.V. MASINI, Antonio Bueno, Dizionario Enciclopedico dei pittori e degli incisori italiani, ed. G. Bolaffi, Turin, 1972.
- P.C. SANTINI, Antonio Bueno, gall. Fillungo, Lucca, 1972.
- A. GATTO, Antonio Bueno, gall. Internazionale, Montecatini Terme, 1972.
- R. TOSATTI, Intervista con Antonio Bueno, 'Eco d'arte', a.V., n. 1, Florence, 1972.
- C.L. RAGGHIANTI, Antonio Bueno, Eileen Kuhlik Gallery, New York, 1973.
- C.L. RAGGHIANTI, Antonio Bueno, gall. Idea-Bellini, Florence, 1973.
- W. LATTES, Saggio biografico, ed. Feltrinelli, Milan, 1975.
- E. SANGUINETI, Antonio Bueno, ed. Feltrinelli, Milan, 1975
- A. GATTO, Antonio Bueno, gall L'Età dell'Acquario, Sassari, 1976.
- C. MARSAN, Le carte parlanti di Antonio Bueno, gall. La Gradiva 2, Florence, 1976.
- L.V. MASINI, Antonio Bueno, i Kinderstúcke, ed. Bolaffi, Turin, 1976.
- S. RUBBOLI, I manichini sognano, Ed. Globarte-Pentacolo Toscano, Florence, 1976.
- R. BIASION, Antonio Bueno, gall. Piero della Francesca, Arezzo, 1977.
- D. MICACCHI, Antonio Bueno, 'L'Unità', ottobre, Rome, 1977.
- G.A. BERTOZZI, Le peintre pompier, St. Inquadrature 33, Florence, 1978.
- L. CARLUCCIO, Antonio Bueno, 'Panorama', giugno, Milan, 1978.
- F. DE POLI, Le pompier qui prend feu, ed. Techne, Florence, 1978.
- F. MASINI, Antonio Bueno o la metafisica dell'immagine, 'Informatore Librario', ed. Lucarini, dicembre, Rome, 1979.
- V. BRAMANTI, Bueno solitario nella casa di Masaccio, 'L'Unità', maggio, Rome, 1979.
- F. MENNA, Antonio Bueno, S. Giovanni Valdarno, 1979.
- L. PIGNOTTI, Stai al gioco? Centro Morandi, Rome, 1979.
- C.L. RAGGHIANTI, Antonio Bueno, Villa Simes, Padua, 1979.
- M. LUZI, Due note, con sette litografie di A.Bueno, ed. L'Upupa, Florence, 1980.
- F. MENNA, Antonio Bueno, 'Le monografie allegate al Catalogo Nazionale Bolaffi d'Arte Moderna', ed. G. Mondadori, Milan, 1980.
- E. MICCINI, Antonio Bueno, Collezione Privata, ed. La Piramide, Florence, 1980.
- Y. VELAN, Le pompier, ses oeuvres et ses pompes, 9 litografie di Antonio Bueno, ed. de la Galerie de l'Hotel de Ville, Ginevra, 1980.
- P. CHIARA, Antonio Bueno - Pensiero, Il Biribissi, Sanremo, 1981.
- R. MONTI, Lo specchio di Bueno. D'après Ingres, gall. Ferretti, Viareggio, 1981.
- S. SALVI, La conoscenza al bianco - Antonio Bueno, I monocromi 1955-1981, Studio d'arte Melotti, Ferrara, 1981.
- P. SANTI, Antonio Bueno, opere dal 1936 al 1981, Palazzo Strozzi, ed. Salani, Florence, 1981.
- M. LUZI, Diavolo d' un Bueno, gall. Ferretti, Viareggio, 1982.
- F. SOLMI, Antonio Bueno, gall. Forni, Bologna, 1982.
- B. CORADINI, A. Bueno - Olio petrolio frigo polpastrelli, 'Prospettive d'Arte' Milan, luglio/agosto,1983.
- G. DI GENOVA, Il ludismo sperimentale di Antonio Bueno, 'Terzo Occhio', a. XI, n. 29, Bologna, dicembre, 1983.
- M. FAGIOLO DELL'ARCO, Dalla metafisica alla metafisica attraverso il surrealismo, gall. Metastasio, Prato - FIAC, Paris, 1983.
- M. FAGIOLO DELL'ARCO, Bueno 83 / Rifare il differente fingendolo uguale, gall. Metastasio, Prato, 1983.
- P. LEVI, Hidalgo ma con ironia, ‘Capital’ n. 5, maggio, Milan, 1983.
- F. MENNA, Bueno. Ciò che gli ha detto Ingres, gall. Apogeo, Naples-Ischia, 1983.
- F. MENNA - M. LUZI, Antonio Bueno, 'La Vernice', n. 220-221, Venice-Mestre, 1983.
- AA.VV., I Pittori Moderni della Realtà (1947–1949), Comune of Florence, Florence, 1984.
- G. DI GENOVA, Antonio Bueno, o della dissacrazione oculata, ed. Bora, Bologna, 1985.
- F. SOLMI, Antonio Bueno, gall. La Gradiva, Rome, 1985.
- F. SOLMI, Antonio Bueno, gall. Guidi, Genoa, 1985.
- E. DALLA NOCE, Antonio Bueno fra la realtà e l'occasione, Pinacoteca Comunale, Terziere al Borgo, 1986.
- AA. VV, Antonio Bueno, ed. Prospettive d'Arte, Milan, 1986.
- E. DALLA NOCE, Antonio Bueno - Mostra antologica, Museo di Castel Sant'Angelo, ed. Bora, Bologna 1987.
- C. MARSAN, Antonio Bueno, Omaggio a Raffaello, premessa di P.Bigongiari, ed. Saverio Becocci, Florence, 1987.
- E. DALLA NOCE, Antonio Bueno - Mostra antologica, Pinacoteca Comunale di Montepulciano, ed. Bora, Bologna, 1988.
- M. LUZI, Antonio Bueno, Renzo Spagnoli Arte, Lugano, 1990.
- F. MENNA, Antonio Bueno. Viaggio intorno alle impronte, ed. Bora, Bologna, 1990.
- V. SGARBI, Ritratto. Il Ritratto nella pittura italiana del Novecento, ed. Grafis, Bologna, 1991.
- P. LEVI - T. BUENO, Antonio Bueno, catalogo generale delle opere, vol.I, ed. Giorgio Mondadori, Milan, 1994.
- T. BUENO, Mio padre, Bueno, 'Arte' Mondadori, settembre, Milan, 1994.
- M. FAGIOLO DELL’ARCO, Il pittore allo specchio – Autoritratti italiani del novecento, ed. Civiche Gallerie d’Arte Moderna e Contemporanea, Palazzo dei Diamanti, Ferrara, 1995.
- P. LEVI, Giochi di figure, Elede Editrice, Turin, 1997.
- M. PRATESI - A. SCAPPINI, Il disegno in Toscana, 1900–1945, ed. Maschietto & Musolino, Siena, 1998.
- C. SISI, Motivi e Figure nell’Arte Toscana del XX Secolo, ed. Banca Toscana, Florence, 2000.
- AA.VV, Annigoni,(ne I Pittori Moderni della Realtà), ed. Polistampa, Florence, 2000.
