= Portrait of Catherine, Duchess of Cambridge =

2012 painting by Paul Emsley

- Artist: Paul Emsley
- Year: 2012
- Type: Portrait
- Medium: Oil on canvas
- Dimensions: 115.2 cm × 96.5 cm (45.4 in × 38.0 in)
- Location: National Portrait Gallery; London

The Portrait of Catherine, Duchess of Cambridge, is the first official portrait of Catherine, Duchess of Cambridge (who later became Princess of Wales). It was unveiled at the National Portrait Gallery, London, on 11 January 2013. Paul Emsley was commissioned to paint the work after being selected from a shortlist by Catherine herself. Catherine had announced the National Portrait Gallery as one of her official patronages in January 2012. Emsley took 15 weeks to complete the painting, which was presented to the trustees of the gallery in November 2012. The Duchess, contrary to considerable criticism in the art world, highly praised the portrait after viewing it initially in a private family gathering.

== Description ==
The Portrait of Catherine, Duchess of Cambridge, is the first official portrait of the Duchess. Emsley, originally of South Africa and a 2007 recipient of the BP Portrait Award, had previously painted portraits of Nelson Mandela and V. S. Naipaul. In a video interview for The Daily Telegraph, Emsley suggested that in the beginning he was thrilled to receive the commission; slowly, he realized that the importance of the project, not just for himself, but for many others, was making him slightly nervous.

The Duchess sat for him twice—for a day's session in May at the artist's studio in Bradford-upon-Avon, and a brief session in June at Kensington Palace, where he did quick drawings and took more photographs—and he used photographs to assist him. He describes her during the process as "quite amenable". It shows Catherine wearing a bottle green pussy bow blouse, looking straight out from the picture, smirking, rather than grinning. The artist noted that, if too defined, smiling portraiture occasionally may "look like caricatures". Emsley darkened the eyes slightly to match her tunic; the background is also shaded in a similar hue of dark green. Emsley was also keen to draw attention to the rich texture of her hair. Talking to the BBC after criticism of his work, he noted that he did not want to overwhelm her face. Emsley said, "I don't have lots of things in the background. I do like large faces, I find them strong and contemporary. I'm interested in the landscape of the face, the way in which light and shadow fall across the forms. That's really my subject matter. To have anything else in there is really just an interference." As Catherine's image "is so pervasive", he told the media he needed to go past the image on his mind.

The process took him 15 weeks with the portrait completed before November 2012, when it was presented to the trustees of the gallery. The portrait was displayed in Room 37 on the ground floor of the National Portrait Gallery Contemporary Collections, next to a video of a sleeping David Beckham. It was donated to the gallery by Sir Hugh Legatt with support of The Art Fund, in memory of Sir Denis Mahon.

== Reception ==
The portrait divided critics, seen in a negative light by many. Michael Glover of The Independent described it as "catastrophic", and noted that it lacked context. When presented with Glover's comments on the BBC, the artist laughed them off, quipping "can he draw?" He noted that he believes in his work, and understands that there would be different points of view. Waldemar Januszczak of the Sunday Times described the portrait as "disappointing". Charlotte Higgins, of The Guardian, compared the depiction of Catherine to a character in the Twilight franchise, saying, "The first thing that strikes you about Middleton's visage as it looms from the sepulchral gloom of her first official portrait is the dead eyes: a vampiric, malevolent glare beneath heavy lids. Then there's the mouth: a tightly pursed, mean little lip-clench (she is, presumably, sucking in her fangs). And God knows what is going on with the washed-out cheeks: she appears to be nurturing a gobbet of gum in her lower right cheek. The hair is dull and lifeless; the glimpse of earring simply lifts her to the status of Sloaney, rather than merely proletarian, undead."

Scotsman arts editor Andrew Eaton-Lewis suggested that "there's something troubling about the fact that the case against this painting is essentially that it makes a pretty young woman look less pretty and less young." Eaton-Lewis commented that "a portrait which makes Middleton appear older, more distinguished, and more ordinary is judged to be unfit for purpose" was "depressing". Another art critic, Fisun Güner, a freelance visual arts writer, also criticised the painting, mentioning that the hair is painted in a spread out wavy cascade which starts to look like an advertisement for a shampoo. Fisun makes the observation that the blouse in the big-bow shape, which she is wearing covered up to the neck, makes her appear "stiff and rather straight-jacketed". However, Fisun believed the eyes look bright and lively and the jewellery, which she is shown wearing, stated to belong to her mother-in-law, are earrings made of sapphire and diamond, which bring out an animated look in the portrait.

Royal Society of Portrait Painters president Alistair Adams suggested that there "are no airs and graces, there's no background context to allude to success or power – it's very much on a level of one to one with the viewer. It's quite natural, it's open, it's straightforward and very pure – it's immediate and not overly sentimental." Stephen Deuchar, director of The Art Fund, called it a "captivating contemporary image".
