= Portrait of the Artist (Mary Cassatt) =

1878 painting by Mary Cassatt

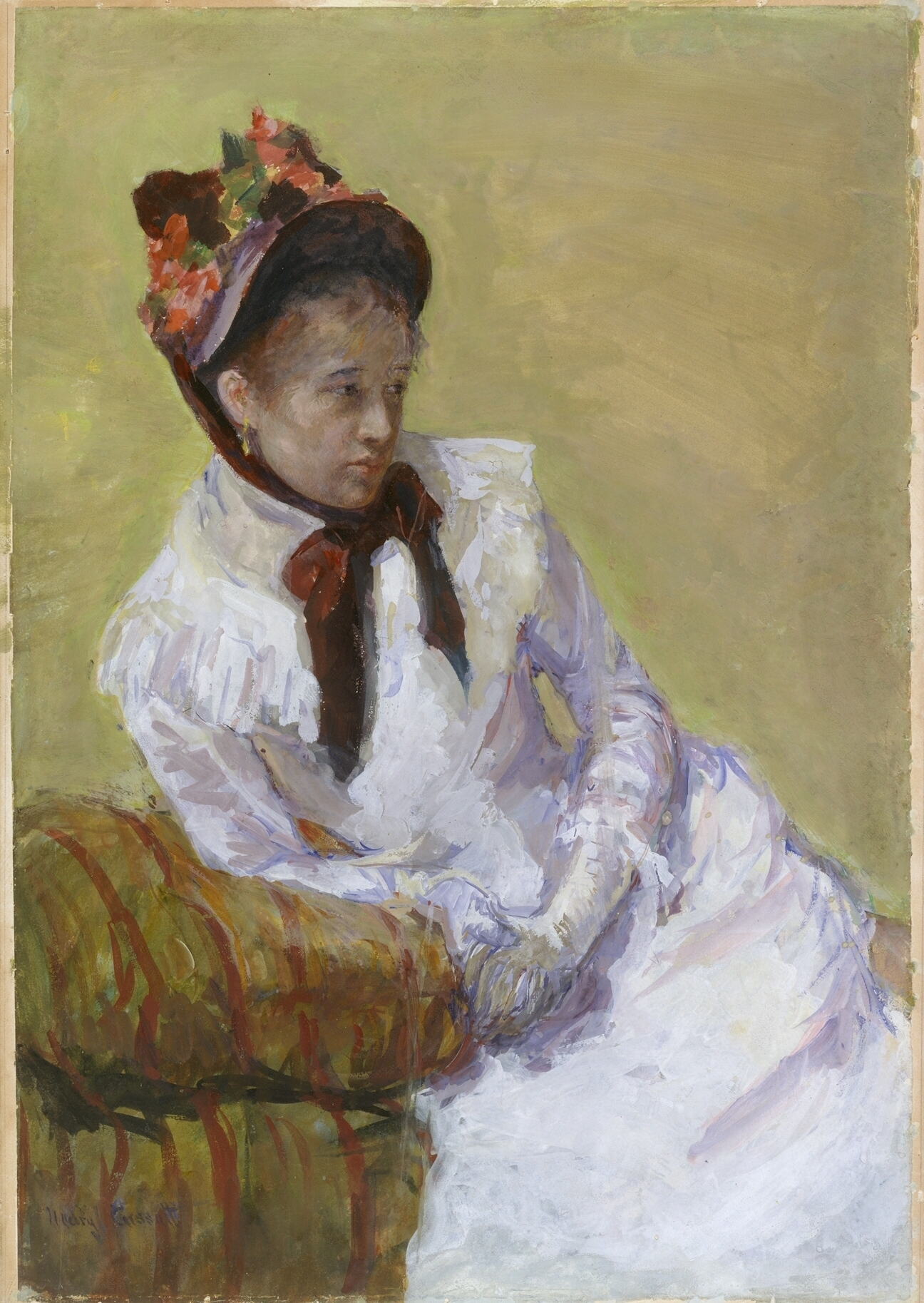
- Artist: Mary Cassatt
- Year: 1878
- Medium: gouache on paper
- Dimensions: 60 cm × 41.1 cm (24 in × 16.2 in)
- Location: Metropolitan Museum of Art; New York

Portrait of the Artist is an 1878 self-portrait painting by Mary Cassatt. It is in the collection of the Metropolitan Museum of Art, New York.

== Early history and creation ==
According to the Metropolitan Museum of Art, her painting is a "watercolour, gouache on wove paper laid down to buff-colored wood-pulp paper". It is now in the public domain.

== See also ==
- List of works by Mary Cassatt
