= Liggett Lake Dam =

- Location: Union County, Ohio
- Coordinates: 40°15′21″N 83°31′49″W
- Construction began: 1968
- Operator(s): Private Property

Reservoir
- Creates: Liggett Lake
- Catchment area: Big Darby Creek
- Surface area: 11 acres (4.5 ha)

Liggett Lake Dam is a dam located in Allen Township, Union County, Ohio, United States, about 2.5 miles (4.0 km) north of North Lewisburg, at 40°15′21″N 83°31′49″W. It was built privately by L. Liggett in 1968 on a small tributary to the Big Darby Creek, and the reservoir created is called Liggett Lake.
