= Leggatt Island =

Island in Queensland, Australia

- Interactive map of Leggatt Island

Geography
- Location: Northern Australia
- Coordinates: 14.548°S 144.869°E

Administration
- Australia
- State: Queensland

Leggatt Island is part of the Great Barrier Reef Marine Park and the easternmost island in the Cole Islands group and National Park and is about 100 km south-east of Cape Melville, Queensland.

Leggatt Island is a vegetated sand cay located 15 km from the coast, well-established with coconut palms and sisal that provide a habitat for a number of roosting birds and green turtles and hawksbill turtles.

This island is used by a number of tour operators.
