= Shellfish Association of Great Britain =

The Shellfish Association of Great Britain (SAGB) is a historic association that was founded as the Oyster Merchants' and Planters' Association in 1903, it was renamed the SAGB in 1969. They cover a wide range of topics within the shellfish industry, from trading to advice on nutritional standards and also the sustainability of the industry.

== History and role ==

The SAGB is the Shellfish industry's trade body with the director and staff based at Fishmongers' Hall which is also home to the Worshipful Company of Fishmongers and can be found in the City of London. The SAGB consists of a wide range of members located within the Shellfish farming and fishing industry, within commercial companies and traders of Shellfish products, the Seafish Industry Authority and the major Sea Fisheries Committees. Gradually the range of species marketed and the number of activities covered by the SAGB have extended over its 105 years of service to the industry (updated 17 July 2008).

The association provides support on various topics of interest to the UK Shellfish industry, which is part of a valuable constituent in the UK economy. The SAGB also gives technical advice and mediates in a range of environmental issues ranging from coastal pollution, aggregate dredging and stock conservation. Furthermore, they maintain a working relationship with important conservation agencies: Natural England (NE), Countryside Council for Wales (CCW), Scottish Natural Heritage (SNH) and the Northern Ireland - Environment & Heritage Service. Additional conservation organizations include: The Marine Conservation Society, RSPB and World Wildlife Fund (WWF). Amongst other bodies associated with the SAGB are the Marine Stewardship Council and Coastnet. In summary the SAGB promote the sustainable development of the UK shellfish industry having always given advice on various topical issues and helped provide members with information about new technical advances in the industry or changes in legislation and the market.

== Objectives ==
=== Public health and shellfish ===

The SAGB's first priority has been to ensure shellfish safety for human consumption. The association took a leading role in advising on standards when the European Commission(EC) drew up the Bivalve Shellfish Hygiene Directive and Fishery Products Directives. All commercially harvested shellfish are subject to strict hygiene regulations. Some people do suffer from allergies to shellfish, and this is an unfortunate fact of life. Often the allergies are very specific and caused by one type of shellfish only. Shellfish should be carefully stored keeping them cool but moist. Do not re-water shellfish, which you have bought. They will already have been cleaned to the requisite standard and re-watering only increases risk of re-contamination.

Under certain conditions, some species of marine algae form blooms with can produce natural toxins. Bivalve molluscs, like mussels and scallops, feeding on these microscopic algae may accumulate these toxins, which are a potential risk to human health. These "red tides" occur worldwide and are a natural phenomenon. Under the European Commission's Shellfish Hygiene Directive, Member States must have algal toxin monitoring programs, which cover all the commercial shellfish production areas. Target levels of toxins are set by the EC and fisheries can be closed to protect the public health if concentrations of toxins exceed these limits. In 2007 scallop beds along the west coast of Scotland were affected by a bloom which caused Amnesic Shellfish Poisoning (ASP).

Amnesic Shellfish Poisoning is caused by domoic acid which is produced naturally by marine diatoms of the genus Pseudonitzschia. If molluscan shellfish filter large amounts of these algae it can lead to illness such as gastrointestinal symptoms, muscular aches, cramps and temporary loss of short-term memory. To date, there have been no illnesses in the UK, which can be linked to ASP toxins and the strict monitoring safeguards have been effective. All three algal toxins known to occur occasionally in British waters are routinely monitored and the fisheries closed when necessary.

=== Shellfish and nutrition ===
Shellfish should form an essential part of any healthy diet. Shellfish provide protein, vitamins and minerals, are low in fat and a wonderful source of the Omega-3 fatty acid. Different shellfish have different health benefits so, to make the most of these, we should vary the types we eat. There over 20 species available to eat in the UK alone.

Shellfish are excellent sources of protein; a 100 gram serving of shellfish provides about 10-25 grams of protein, roughly a third to half of the average UK recommended protein intake. The protein in shellfish is of high quality, containing many essential amino acids and, because of a lack of connective tissue, very digestible for people of all ages. Shellfish are also generally lower in fat, less than 5%, and accordingly contain fewer calories than beef, poultry or pork. For example, a 100g portion of prawns (a typical prawn cocktail amount) contains only 0.2g of saturated fat and 76 calories, whilst 100g of beef mince contains 6.9g and 225 calories.

Table below: all values = per 100g serving

Shellfish	Saturated Fat (g)	Fat (g)	Protein (g)	Kcal	Other Meats	Saturated Fat (g)	Fat (g)	Protein (g)	Kcal
Crab	0.7	5.5	19.5	128	Beefburger	10.7	24.7	12.4	291
Mussels	0.5	2.7	16.7	74	Pork Sausage	8	22.1	14.5	286
Scallops	0.4	1.4	23.2	118	Pork Chop	8	21.7	18.6	246
Squid	0.3	1.7	15.4	81	Beef Mince	6.9	16.2	19.7	225
Octopus	0.3	1.3	10.8	83	Back Bacon	6.2	16.2	16.5	215
Shrimp	0.2	2.4	23.8	117	Rump Steak	4.3	10.1	20.7	174
Lobster	0.2	1.6	22.1	103	Lamb Leg	3.8	9.4	29.7	207
Oyster	0.2	1.3	10.8	65	Mackerel	3.3	16.1	18.7	220
Whelks	0.2	1.2	19.5	89	Chicken	1.5	5.2	28.4	148
Prawns	0.2	0.9	22.6	76	Cod	0.1	0.7	18.3	80
Cockles	0.2	0.6	12	53	Haddock	0.1	0.6	19	81

Contrary to the "old wives' tale" that certain shellfish (i.e. prawns) raise cholesterol we now understand that the amount of saturated fat in the diet has a greater effect in raising blood cholesterol than the amount of cholesterol in the diet. So while dietary cholesterol is present in prawns, crabs and lobsters, as well as in squid and octopus, they contain very little saturated fat and for most people do not cause a rise in the level of cholesterol in the blood. Shellfish such as cockles, mussels, oysters, scallops and clams are very low in cholesterol, about half as much as chicken, and contain much less cholesterol than red meats.

Different shellfish contain different amounts of omega 3 fatty acids. Overall shellfish contain similar amount to whitefish, but crab and oysters are particularly rich sources, a 100g portion of each providing a third of the UK recommended weekly intake of omega 3!

Shellfish are also loaded with vitamins. Half a dozen oysters provide approximately 10% of the recommended daily allowance of vitamin A while a cocktail amount of prawns provide around 50% of the recommended daily amount of vitamin E. There is little Vitamin C found in shellfish, but all shellfish are good sources of the B complex vitamins, particularly B_{12} with most species exceeding the recommended daily amount by at least 200%.

Seafood in general is an excellent source of minerals. Shellfish are especially valuable sources of copper, iodine and zinc. Other minerals in shellfish include iron (cockles, oysters and mussels), selenium (crab, octopus, squid, lobster, shrimps and mussels). Shellfish are also high in potassium, with most species providing 10% of the recommended daily amount per 100g serving.

=== Shellfish Industry Development Strategy (SIDS) ===
The SAGB's most recent focus is under the SIDS framework, which requires the company to formulate a strategy detailing ways to achieve the sustainable development of the shellfish industry, that fully recognises the need for environmental and social sustainability as well as commercial development. The relative timeframes for initiatives to be achieved ultimately is targeted within the Defra "2027 Fisheries Vision" (and other national strategies).

== About the shellfish industry ==

The shellfish industry in the UK is often perceived as the poor relation when compared to the fin-fisheries such as cod and haddock. The industry is generally viewed and depicted as a quaint, cottage industry that sells its wares on the quayside for enough of a profit for a few beers that night. But what of reality?

=== Wild stock ===
It may be surprising to learn that the UK shellfish industry is vast. Wild-caught shellfish landings have now overtaken cod and haddock, the traditional mainstays of the fleet. Of the 417,000 tonnes of seafood landed into the UK in 2006, shellfish contributed just over 133,000 tonnes or 32% of the volume. Demersal finfish (such as flatfish, cod, haddock etc.) and pelagic finfish (such as herring and mackerel) each contributed around 141,000 tonnes, approximately 34% of the total volume each.

Landings of shellfish increased by 7% from 2005 and look to continue rising as fin-fish landings continue to decrease. Over the same time pelagic landings decreased by 31% and demersal landings decreased by 6%. Indeed, since 1999 the volume of fish landed into Scotland (Scottish Government Fisheries Statistics 2006) shows that demersal fish are down by approx 51%, pelagic fish down by approx 36% while shellfish are up by approx 19%. So it certainly appears that shellfish is THE dominant growth sector.

In terms of value, in 2006 shellfish landings were worth nearly £241 million, which is almost a 30% increase compared with 2005. Of total seafood landed into the UK by UK vessels in 2006, demersal species represented 37 per cent of total landings in terms of value while pelagic species accounted for only 15 per cent by value. Overall shellfish accounted for 48% per cent of all seafood landings by value.

=== Cultivated stock ===
The total value of the shellfish cultivated in the UK in 2006 was estimated to be £23 million, from just over 29,000 tonnes. Pacific oyster production in England increased by 56% compared with the amount farmed in 2005. About 64% of this production takes place in the South West of England, with a further 30% from farm sites in East Anglia.

=== Trade ===
In 2006 UK vessels landed 133,000 tonnes of shellfish into the UK:

41,000 tonnes Nephrops (31%)
26,000 tonnes crab (20%)
19,000 tonnes scallops (14%)
11,000 tonnes cockles (10%)
10,000 tonnes mussels (9%)
26,000 tonnes all other species

In 2006 the UK exported 105,000 tonnes of various species of shellfish in similar proportions to percentage landed. We export approximately 79% of what we land, 25,000 tonnes go to Spain (24%), 20,000 tonnes to France (19%) which is where Brits typically eat shellfish on holiday.

In 2006 the UK imported 117,000 tonnes of shellfish, 47,000 tonnes of prepared prawns & shrimps (40%), 43,000 tonnes of fresh/frozen/chilled unprepared prawns & shrimps (37%) so in total 77% of all imports were cold or warm water prawns & shrimps.
