= Charles Yang (linguist) =

American linguist

- Awards: 2018 Bloomfield Book Award; 2018 Guggenheim Fellowship

Academic background
- Education: Case Western Reserve University (BS); Massachusetts Institute of Technology (SM, PhD)
- Thesis: Knowledge and Learning in Natural Language (2000)
- Academic advisors: Robert Berwick; Noam Chomsky

Academic work
- Institutions: Yale University; University of Pennsylvania

Charles Yang (born 1973) is a linguist and cognitive scientist. He is currently Professor in the Department of Linguistics at the University of Pennsylvania. His research focuses on language acquisition, variation and change, and is carried out from a broadly Chomskyan perspective.

Yang is a graduate of MIT's AI Lab. His first book, Knowledge and Learning in Natural Language (2002), proposes a model of syntactic acquisition couched within the Principles and Parameters framework. In this model, different grammatical options are associated with different probabilities, which change over time. The model is applied to a number of case studies in language acquisition and historical linguistics. His second book, The Infinite Gift: How Children Learn and Unlearn the Languages of the World (2006), is written for a popular audience, and explores acquisition and knowledge of language. Yang's third book, The Price of Productivity: How Children Learn to Break the Rules of Language (2016), won the Linguistic Society of America's Leonard Bloomfield Award. This book deals with the acquisition of linguistic rules with exceptions, and proposes a quantifiable upper bound on the number of lexical exceptions that a grammatical rule can tolerate.

In 2018, Yang was awarded a Guggenheim Fellowship.

== Books ==
- —— (2001). Knowledge and Learning in Natural Language (PhD thesis). MIT. hdl:1721.1/86586.
- —— (2002). Knowledge and Learning in Natural Language. Oxford University Press. ISBN 978-0-19-925414-9.
- —— (2006). The Infinite Gift: How Children Learn and Unlearn the Languages of the World. New York: Scribner. ISBN 978-0-7432-3756-7.
- —— (2016). The Price of Productivity: How Children Learn to Break the Rules of Language. Cambridge, MA: MIT Press. ISBN 978-0-262-03532-3.
