= Pietro Annigoni =

Italian painter (1910–1988)

Pietro Annigoni OMRI
- Pietro Annigoni, self-portrait
- Born: 7 June 1910; Milan, Italy
- Died: 28 October 1988 (aged 78); Florence, Italy
- Education: Accademia di Belle Arti
- Known for: Fresco, oil painting, portrait painting, drawing, sculpture
- Movement: Realism (visual arts)
- Awards: Cavaliere di Gran Croce OMRI

Pietro Annigoni (7 June 1910 – 28 October 1988) was an Italian artist, portrait painter, fresco painter and medallist, best known for his painted portraits of Queen Elizabeth II. His work was in the Renaissance tradition, contrasting with the modernist style that prevailed in his time.

== Life ==
Born in Milan in 1910, Annigoni was influenced by the Italian Renaissance. From the end of the 1920s on, he lived mainly in Florence, where he studied at the College of the Piarist Fathers.

In 1927, he was admitted to the Academy of Fine Arts in Florence, where he attended the courses given by Felice Carena in painting, Giuseppe Graziosi in sculpture, and Celestino Celestini in etching. Annigoni enrolled in the nude class run by the Florentine Circolo degli Artisti, while attending the open class in the same subject at the Academy.

Annigoni exhibited his work for the first time in Florence in 1930 with a group of painters. He had his first individual exhibition two years later, in 1932 at the Bellini Gallery in the Palazzo Ferroni.

In 1932, journalist Ugo Ojetti featured Annigoni in the Arts section of the Corriere della Sera. Also in 1932, he won the Trentacoste prize.

=== Family ===
Annigoni was married to Anna Giuseppa Maggini in 1937 until her death of illness in July 1969. They had two children, Benedetto (1939) and Maria Ricciarda. In 1976 he married Rossella Segreto, also a favorite model of the artist.

=== Death ===
In May 1988, Annigoni had emergency surgery due to a perforated ulcer, and did not recover fully from the ailment. He was rushed to the hospital in Florence on 27 October 1988 and died of kidney failure on 28 October 1988. He is buried in the Porte Sante (Holy Doors) cemetery at the Basilica di San Miniato al Monte, overlooking his beloved Florence.

== Controversy in tradition ==
Between 1945 and 1950, Annigoni produced a succession of important and very successful works. In 1947, he signed the manifesto of Modern Realist Painters. In this manifesto the group, which consisted of seven painters, came out in open opposition to abstract art and the various movements that had sprung up in Italy in these years. It was an insignificant detail in the painter's life but it would become a key point of reference in literature about him. Among others who signed the petition were Gregory Sciltian, and brothers Antonio and Xavier Bueno.

In March 1949, the Committee of the Royal Academy in England accepted the works Annigoni offered for its annual exhibition. It was the artist's first experience with England and the beginning of a success which was to acquire worldwide dimensions.

== Exhibitions ==
Annigoni started showing his work internationally in the 1950s. In London, they were held at Wildenstein's (1950 and 1954), Agnew's (1952 and 1956), the Federation of British Artists (1961), the Upper Grosvenor Galleries (1966), and at many Royal Academy exhibitions. A special exhibition in Paris, France at the Galerie Beaux Arts was held in 1953. New York Wildenstein's showed Annigoni from 1957–58. By 1969, Annigoni's work was exhibited at the Brooklyn Museum in New York. Numerous Italian cities that showed Annigoni works during his life included Turin, Rome, Florence, Verona, Brescia, Montecatini Terme, Pisa, Bergamo, Rovereto and Milan.

== Evaluation ==
His work bore the influence of Italian Renaissance portraiture, and was in contrast to the modernist and post-modernist artistic styles that dominated the middle- and late-twentieth century. Annigoni painted two portraits of Queen Elizabeth II, in 1955 and 1969. The earlier one was commissioned by the Worshipful Company of Fishmongers and is displayed at their livery hall, Fishmongers' Hall; the 1969 portrait was commissioned by the National Portrait Gallery and is on public display there. Following his portrait of the Queen, Annigoni became sought after and painted portraits of Pope John XXIII, US Presidents John F. Kennedy and Lyndon B. Johnson, the Shah and Empress of Iran, Princess Margaret and several other members of the British royal family.

Annigoni was chosen by TIME magazine to paint President John F. Kennedy for the (5 January) 1962 Person of the Year cover. The result was perhaps his least-liked portrait as Annigoni had no time or inclination to satisfy the magazine. Other TIME magazine covers that featured portraits by Annigoni were the issues of 5 October 1962 (Pope John XXIII), 1 November 1963 (Ludwig Erhard), 12 April 1968 (Lyndon B. Johnson) and 30 April 1965 (British Prime Minister Harold Wilson).

Other subjects around the world that Annigoni painted include HRH Prince Philip and several other members of the House of Windsor as well as the shoemaker Salvatore Ferragamo, Florentine author Luigi Ugolini, ballet dancer Dame Margot Fonteyn, British actress Julie Andrews, Russian ballet star Rudolf Nureyev, and the Maharani Gayatri Devi of Jaipur. His study of Author Bill Hopkins was reproduced on the cover of 1984's 'The Leap', a republishing of Hopkins' 1957 book, The Divine and the Decay.

An outspoken artist, Annigoni wrote essays challenging modern art that disregarded the basic ability to draw. He alienated critics, who claimed his art was too representational, discounting the unique dramatic signature the artist brought to Renaissance tradition.

== Church frescoes ==
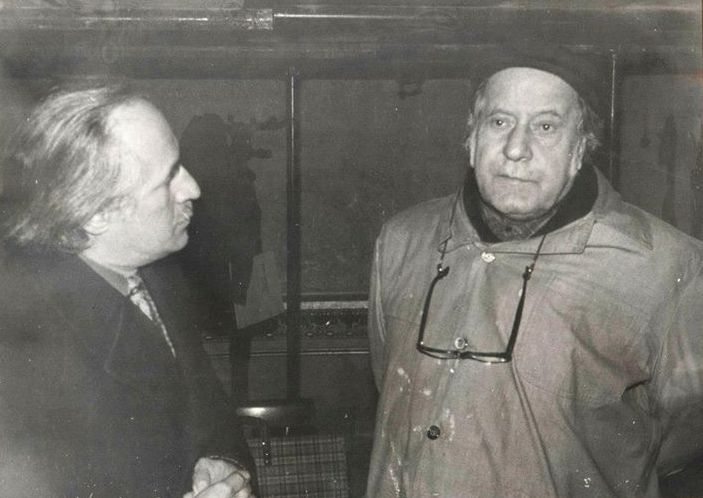
Vittorio Miele (left) and Pietro Annigoni (right), in Monte Cassino

Annigoni was active painting church frescoes in and around Florence. During 1980–1985 (starting at the age of 70 years) at Monte Cassino monastery, he completed his largest fresco, the dome of the monastery.

In 1970 Pietro Annigoni painted "San Giuseppe" an affresco in the Church of Saint Joseph in Galluzzo.

== Honours ==
In 1959, Annigoni was elected to the National Academy of Design as an Honorary Corresponding member.

On 14 November 1975 Annigoni was conferred the Cavaliere di Gran Croce Ordine al Merito della Repubblica Italiana (OMRI)

In October 2010, the Italian Post Office issued a stamp commemorating the centennial of Pietro Annigoni's birth.

== Museums ==
A Museo Pietro Annigoni in Via dei Bardi in Florence, Italy, houses sixty years of the master's work.

- Museo Annigoni, Florence, Italy
- Uffizi Gallery and Pitti Palace in Florence, Italy
- Benedetta Bianchi Porro Foundation in Dovadola (Forlì), Italy
- Metropolitan Museum of Art in New York City
- Indianapolis Museum of Art
- Fine Arts Museum of San Francisco
- Minneapolis Institute of Art
- Royal Collection of Windsor Castle
- National Portrait Gallery of London
- Vatican Museums in Rome, Italy

== See also ==
- Annigoni: Portrait of an Artist
