= Paul Emsley =

British artist (born 1947)

- Born: 25 August 1947 (age 79); Glasgow, Scotland
- Known for: Drawing and painting

Paul Emsley (born 25 August 1947) is a British artist who worked in South Africa until 1996 and is now resident in Bradford-on-Avon, Wiltshire, England. He is a former lecturer at the Stellenbosch University and the 2007 winner of the BP Portrait Award for portrait painting. His work can be found in most public collections in South Africa, The National Portrait Gallery London and The British Museum. He is known for his large detailed images of people, animals and flowers. There was a major retrospective of his work in 2012 at the Sasol Art Gallery in Stellenbosch. He is represented in the UK by the Redfern Gallery and in South Africa by Everard Read. Emsley's portrait of the Princess of Wales is on permanent display at the National Portrait Gallery in London. Other notable portraits include Nelson Mandela, Sir V. S. Naipaul, Michael Simpson and William Kentridge.

== Biography ==
Paul Emsley was born in Glasgow on 25 August 1947. Having grown up in South Africa, he moved to the UK in 1996, and currently resides in Bradford-upon-Avon, although retaining an ongoing presence in South Africa. In 2012 he was commissioned to paint the official Portrait of Catherine, Duchess of Cambridge, which he completed in three and a half months.

== Awards ==
- UWE. Drawing Prize. RWA Autumn Exhibition. 2008
- BP Portrait Award. First Prize. 2007
- Silver Award for Works on Paper. British Interior Design Association. Art London 2005
- UWE Drawing Prize. RWA Autumn Exhibition 2004
- 3rd Prize; Singer & Friedlander Sunday Times Watercolour Competition 2003
- 1st Prize; Singer & Friedlander Sunday Times Watercolour Competition 2002
- 3rd Prize; Singer & Friedlander Sunday Times Watercolour Competition 2001
- Commended; RWA 1st Painting Open 2001
- Bovis-Architects Journal Special Award; Royal Academy Summer Exhibition 2000
- Merit Award; Standard Bank National Drawing Competition 1987
