= Liggett Lake (Ohio) =

- Location within Ohio Location within the United States
- Location: Union County, Ohio, USA
- Coordinates: 40°15′26″N 83°31′46″W
- Type: Reservoir
- Catchment area: Big Darby Creek
- Basin countries: United States
- Surface area: 11 acres (4.5 ha)
- Surface elevation: 1,063 ft (324 m)
- Settlements: North Lewisburg

Liggett Lake is a reservoir in Union County, Ohio created by the Liggett Lake Dam. It is located north of North Lewisburg and just southwest of Pottersburg, at 40°15′26″N 83°31′46″W. It was built in 1968 by L. Liggett on private property.
