= Fishmongers' Hall =

Building in London, headquarters of the Worshipful Company of Fishmongers

Coordinates: 51°30′34″N 0°05′16″W

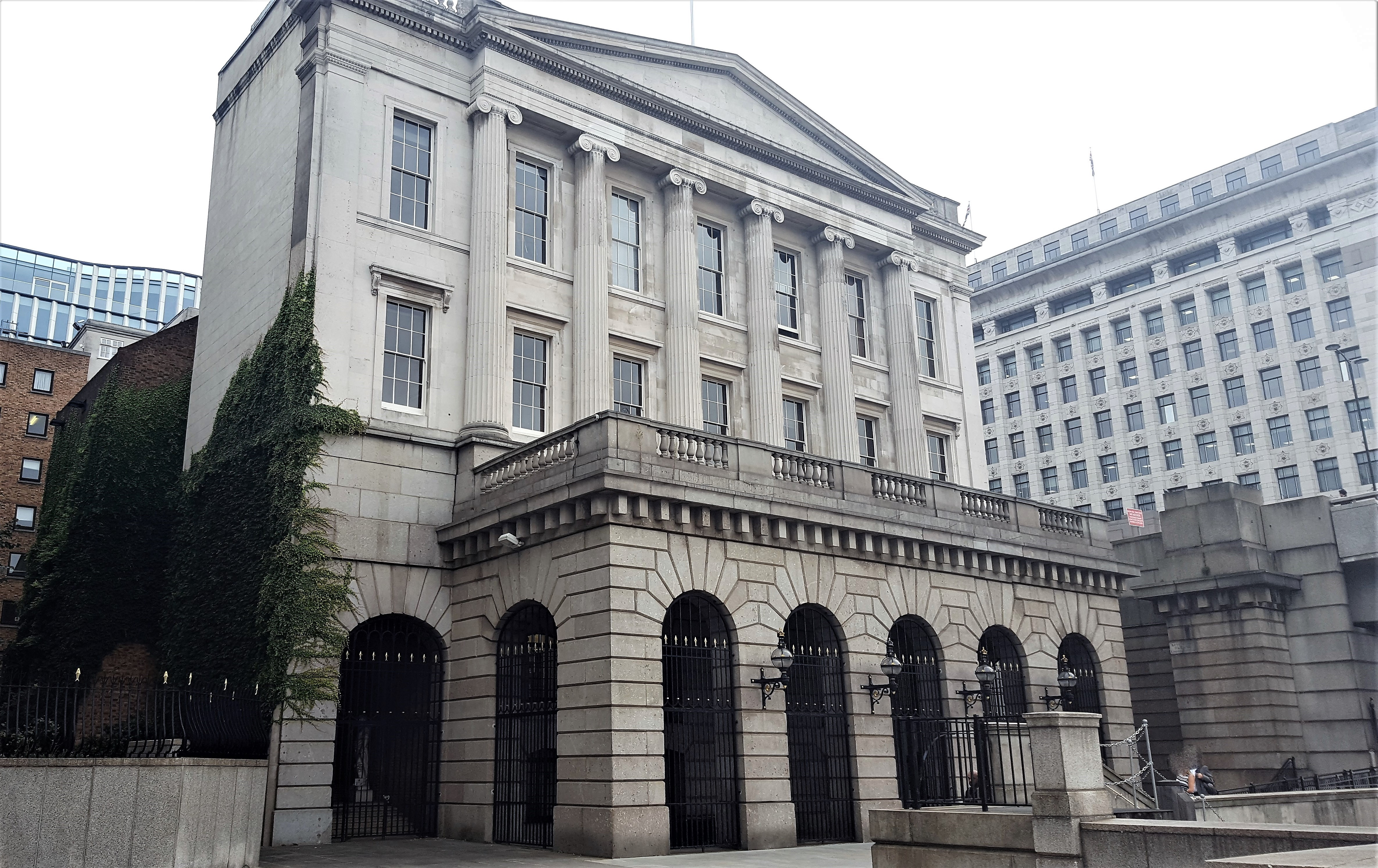
Fishmongers' Hall as seen from Oystergate Walk.

Fishmongers' Hall (sometimes shortened in common parlance to Fish Hall) is a Grade II* listed building adjacent to London Bridge. It is the headquarters of the Worshipful Company of Fishmongers, one of the 114 livery companies of the City of London. The Hall is situated in Bridge ward.

== The buildings ==
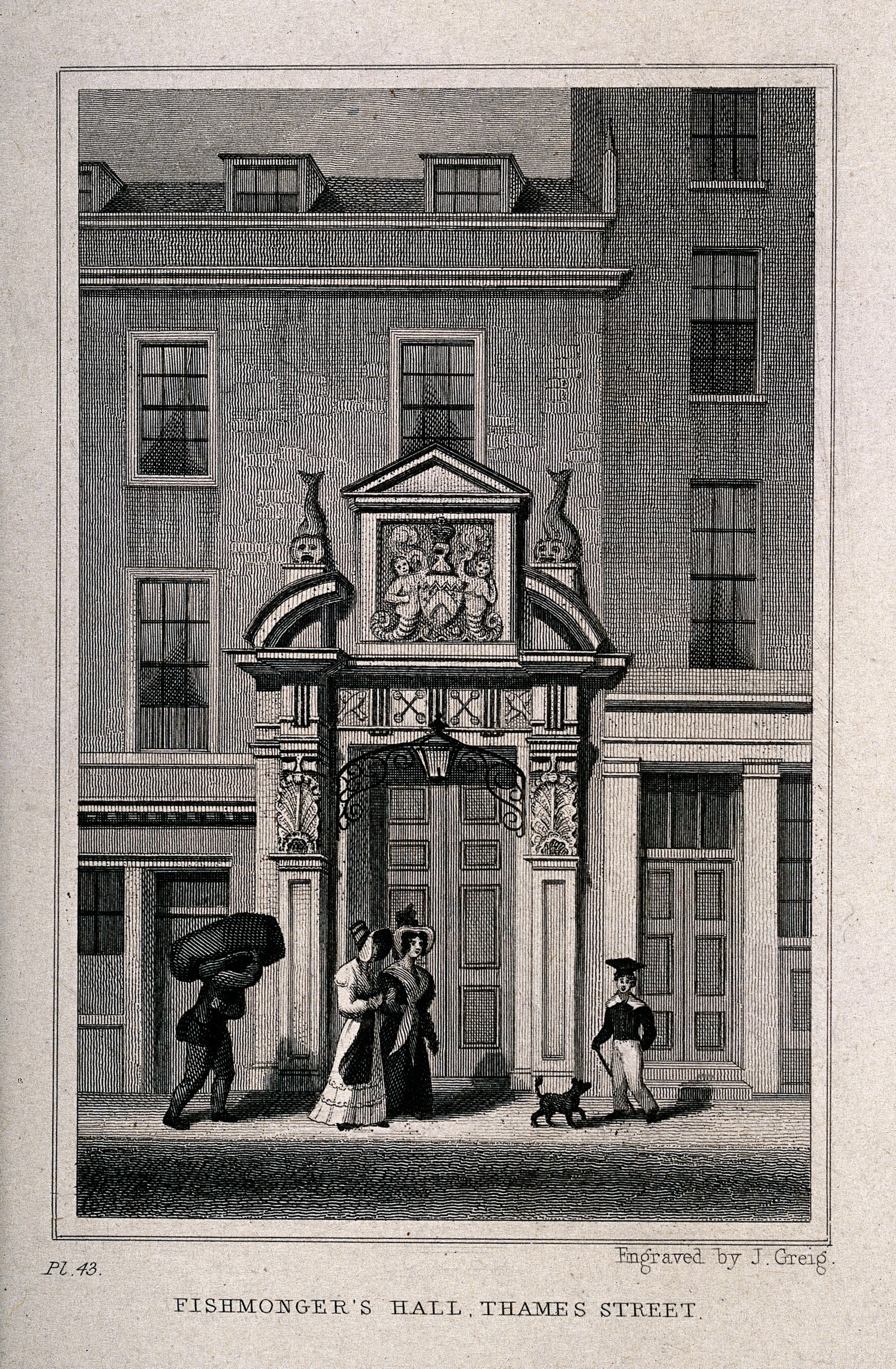
Fishmongers' Hall, Thames Street, London, circa 1830.

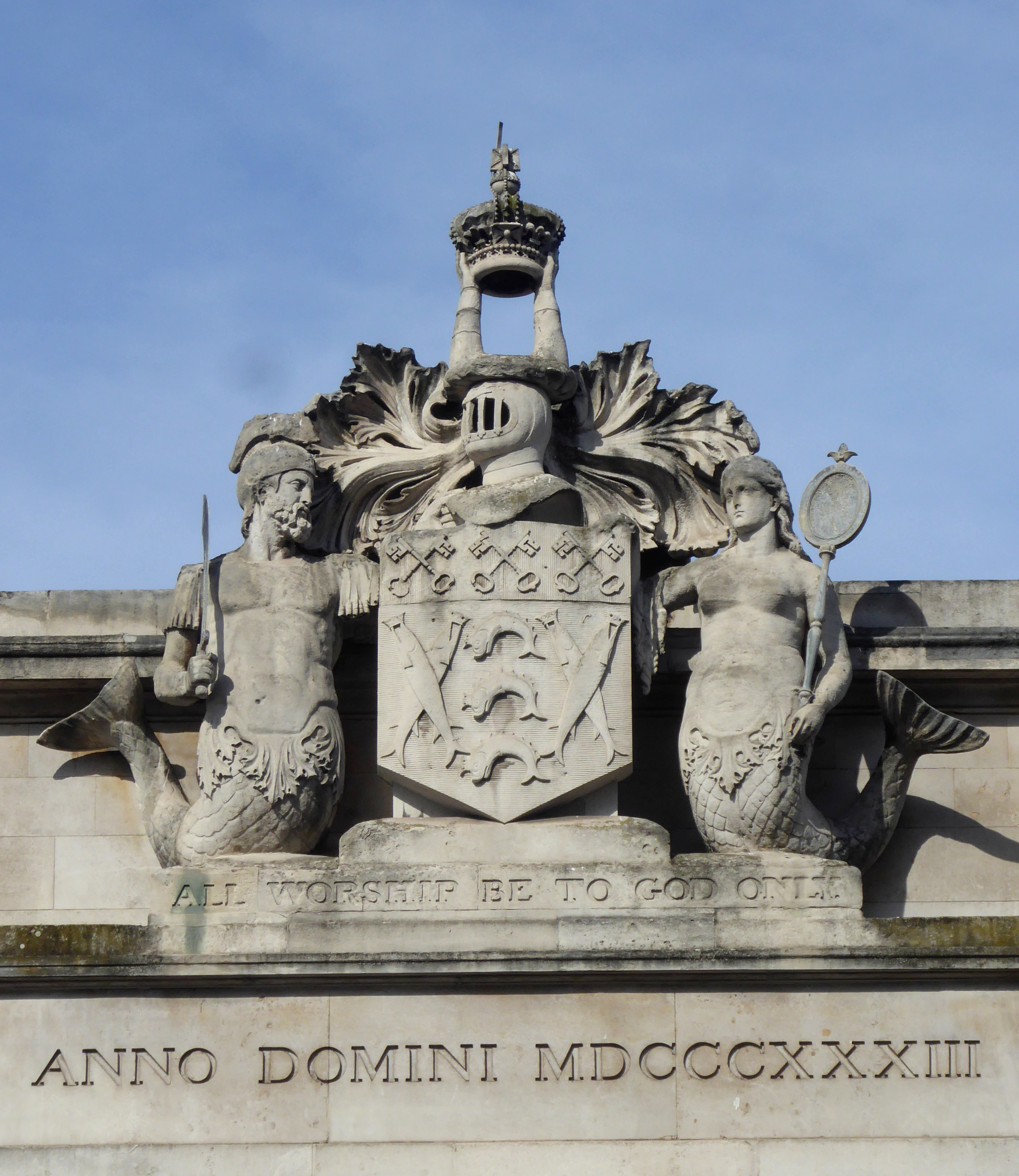
Coat of arms on 1833 Fishmongers' Hall

The first recorded Fishmongers' Hall was built in 1310. A new hall, on the present site, was bequeathed to the Company in 1434. Together with 43 other livery halls, it was destroyed in the Great Fire of London in 1666 and a replacement hall designed by the architect Edward Jerman opened in 1671. This hall by Jerman was demolished to facilitate the construction of the new London Bridge in 1827. The Fishmongers' fourth hall was designed by Henry Roberts (although his assistant, later the celebrated Sir Gilbert Scott, made the drawings) and built by William Cubitt & Company, opening in 1834. After severe bomb damage during the Blitz, Fishmongers' Hall was restored by Austen Hall (of Whinney, Son & Austen Hall) and reopened in 1951.

== The contents ==
The collection in Fishmongers' Hall includes:

- the 1955 portrait of Queen Elizabeth II by Pietro Annigoni
- a collection of 17th- and 18th-century silver
- an embroidered 15th-century funeral pall
- two portraits by George Romney
- river scenes painted by Samuel Scott

The hall also holds a dagger that at one time was popularly believed to have been used by Lord Mayor Walworth to kill Wat Tyler in 1381, and was said to have been given to the City armoury by the king. However, there was no foundation to this legend, as the weapon was in the armoury long beforehand where it was used to represent the sword of St Paul.

== 2019 stabbing ==
On 29 November 2019, Usman Khan, a prisoner attending a Cambridge University conference on prisoner rehabilitation at the hall, wearing what turned out to be a fake suicide vest, threatened to blow up the hall. He subsequently stabbed a number of people in the hall, and two of them – Jack Merritt, a 25-year-old Cambridge University employee, and Saskia Jones, a 23-year-old volunteer – died of their injuries. Khan was wrestled to the ground on the bridge by members of the public, before being shot dead by armed policemen; a Polish man used a pole as a weapon to fight off the attacker, while another man used a narwhal tusk which he had taken from the wall inside Fishmongers' Hall.
