= Richard Leggat =

New Zealand cricketer, businessman and public administrator

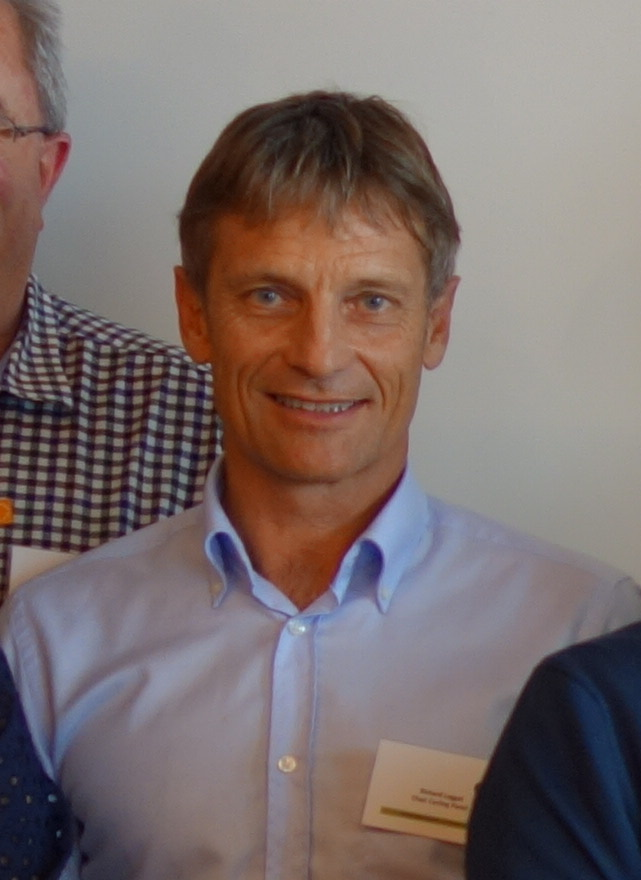
- Leggat in 2014

Personal information
- Full name: Richard Ian Leggat
- Born: 28 August 1960 (age 66); Christchurch, New Zealand
- Batting: Right-handed
- Bowling: Right-arm leg-spin
- Role: All-rounder

Domestic team information
- Years: Team
- 1980/81–1983/84: Canterbury

Career statistics
Competition	First-class	List A
Matches	22	15
Runs scored	563	190
Batting average	19.41	14.61
100s/50s	0/1	0/0
Top score	83	38
Balls bowled	1,368	18
Wickets	24	1
Bowling average	33.16	13.00
5 wickets in innings	1	0
10 wickets in match	0	0
Best bowling	5/37	1/13
Catches/stumpings	14/–	10/–
- Source: Cricinfo, 27 April 2024

Richard Ian Leggat (born 28 August 1960) is a New Zealand former cricketer. He played in 22 first-class and 15 List A matches, mostly for Canterbury, from 1979 to 1984. He became a businessman and public administrator.

== Cricket career ==
Leggat was born in Christchurch and attended Christchurch Boys' High School. A batsman and leg-spin bowler, he captained his school, the New Zealand schoolboys team, the Canterbury Under-23s and New Zealand Under-23s teams. After his first season of first-class cricket in 1980–81, the New Zealand cricket writer R. T. Brittenden called Leggat "a firecracker of a cricketer whose skills and aggression – batting, bowling or fielding – did much to help Canterbury to its very good season".

Leggat captained Canterbury for most of the 1982–83 season. He also captained his club team, Old Collegians, to the title in the Canterbury Cricket Association in 1982–83 and 1983–84. He withdrew from the Canterbury squad before the 1984–85 season, saying he needed a rest from major cricket. He played no further first-class or List A cricket.

Leggat's highest first-class score was 83 when he captained Canterbury to victory over the touring Sri Lankans in 1982–83. His best bowling figures were 3 for 60 and 5 for 37 (he also scored 32 and 33) when Canterbury defeated Northern Districts in 1980–81.

== Professional career ==
While studying at the University of Canterbury, Leggat and a fellow student, Tim Denne, made a special study of the economics of growing sphagnum moss in New Zealand.

Leggat has served on the boards of Panuku Development Auckland, Warren and Mahoney, Snowsports New Zealand, Cycling New Zealand, New Zealand Winter Games, and has been chair of New Zealand Cycle Trail Inc. He was deputy chairman of Tourism New Zealand for eight years and on the board of NZ Post for six years.

He is a trustee of the Rakiura Maori Lands Trust. He was appointed chair of the kiwi conservation organisation Kiwis for Kiwi in 2019. As of 2024 he is chair of Hamilton & Waikato Tourism. He took up the position of chair of Auckland Transport in February 2024.
