= Worshipful Company of Fishmongers =

Livery company of the City of London

Fishmongers' Company
- Motto: All Worship be to God Only
- Location: Fishmongers' Hall, London EC4
- Date of formation: 1272 (Charter regranted 1537)
- Company association: Fish and seafood traders
- Order of precedence: 4th
- Master of company: Andrew Sutcliffe KC (Prime Warden)
- Website: www.fishmongers.org.uk

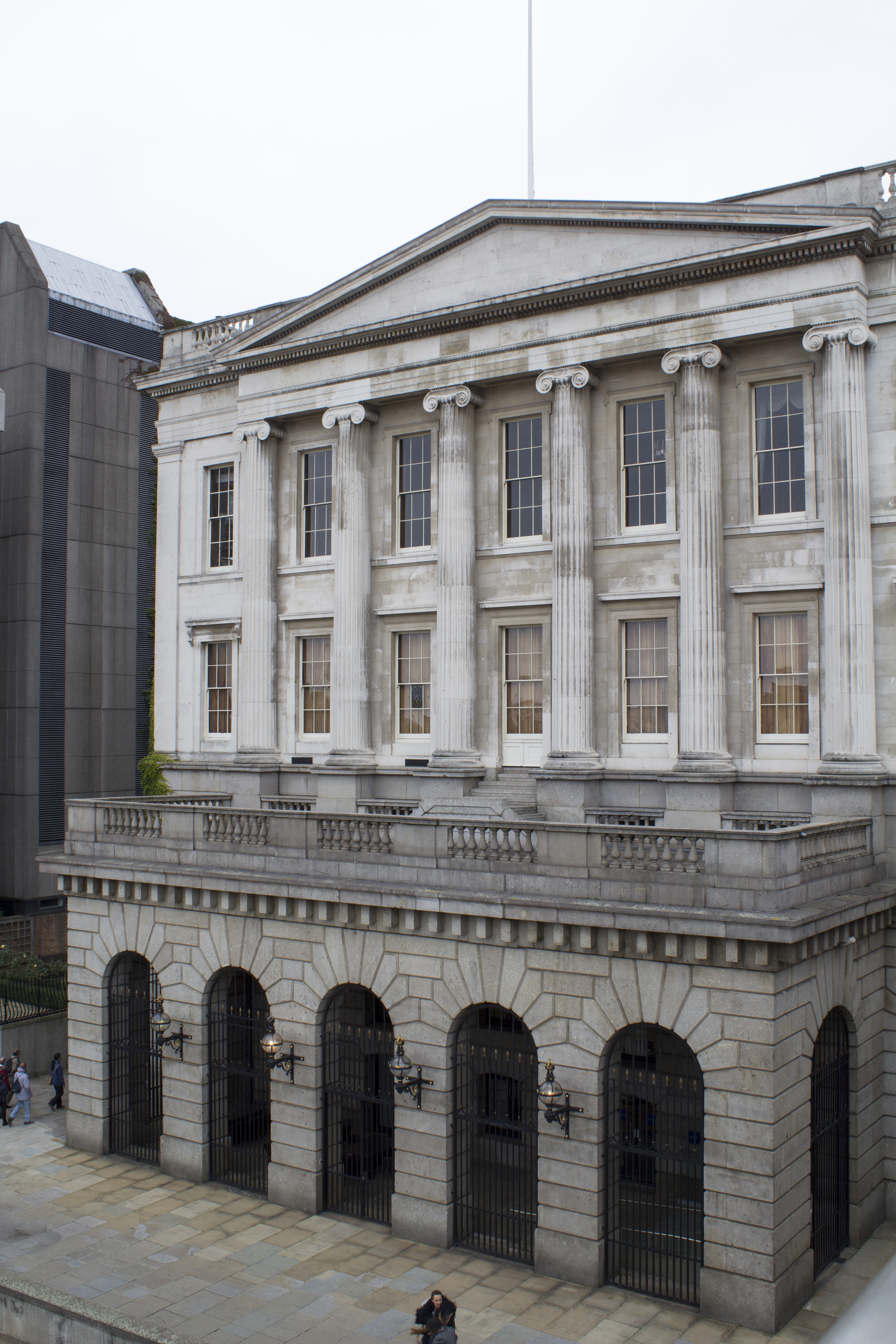
Fishmongers' Hall, London EC4

The Worshipful Company of Fishmongers (or Fishmongers' Company) is one of the 114 livery companies of the City of London, being an incorporated guild of sellers of fish and seafood in the City. The Company ranks fourth in the order of precedence of City Livery Companies, thereby making it one of the Great Twelve City Livery Companies.

== History ==
The Company records an unbroken existence for 750 years, forming as City fishmongers began to collaborate for mutual benefit, developing into a guild which managed London's fish trade according to their defined set of rules and regulation. The earliest evidence of such a group dates back to 1154, when a number of London fishmongers were fined for trading without Royal Warrant with the Company receiving its first Royal Charter from Edward I in 1272 and securing approval for their "ordinances" or detailed market regulations in 1280.

The medieval church forbade the consumption of meat on many days of the year for the purpose of fasting. The market hall shared with the butchers had space sufficient to hold seventy-one market stalls and twenty lesser areas for their trades. In comparison, "most other traders were limited to a single street".

This control was further reinforced by the 1364 Charter from King Edward III which stipulated that "anyone wishing to sell fish were required to lodge with a Fishmonger during their stay in the City". The fishmongers allied with other victuallers to maintain their monopoly, but were resisted by the "lesser trades" who suffered from the higher prices and whose candidate John Northampton became mayor in 1381 and ended the monopoly. However a Royal Charter granted by Richard II in 1399 restored all privileges. The same Charter states they should elect six Wardens annually, the number which continues to the present day.

The most famous City fishmonger is Sir William Walworth who, as Lord Mayor of London in 1381, helped bring the Peasants' Revolt to an end by stabbing the rebel Wat Tyler at Smithfield in the presence of King Richard II.

In 1512 the fishmongers merged with the stockfish company.

In the early 17th century, the Company was granted lands at Ballykelly and Banagher in modern-day Northern Ireland, by the Crown. It remained a major landowner there until the 20th century, and the villages contain some of the most interesting buildings erected in Ulster by the Plantation companies.

In 1714, the Irish actor Thomas Doggett provided money to endow a boat race called Doggett's Coat and Badge Race in honour of the new king, George I of Hanover. The race was originally to be rowed annually on 1 August on the River Thames, by up to six young watermen per boat who were not to be out of their apprenticeship by more than twelve months. The prize for the champion oarsman is a fine red coat embellished with a large silver badge on one arm, depicting the White Horse of Hanover with the word 'liberty' underneath. Since Doggett's death, the Fishmongers' Company continues to organise this event each year, and it is now believed to be the world's longest continuously-running sporting event as well as being the longest boat race in the world – 4 miles, 5 furlongs (7,400 m).

== Functions ==
The Company is governed by its Prime Warden, five other Wardens and its Court of Assistants, comprising 28 appointed Livery members. The Company comprises about 700 members, including a good representation from the seafood trade, UK fisheries and marine and freshwater conservation. All City liverymen can attend Common Hall to vote each year in the election of the Lord Mayor of London.

The Company's Fisheries Charitable Trust maintains its link with its namesake trade, working to "build and safeguard a prosperous and sustainable fishing industry, for the benefit of those engaged in it, the environment and our island nation". Supporting a range of projects across UK fisheries, the Trust works with universities, government and third sector organisations to support, through charitable giving, a sustainable fishing industry, healthy rivers and oceans and thriving coastal communities.

The Company's Charitable Trust responds to a range of social issues, focusing on mental health, food and nutrition and education in prisons. It has also long supported the City and Guilds of London Art School and the City and Guilds of London Institute.

== Hall ==
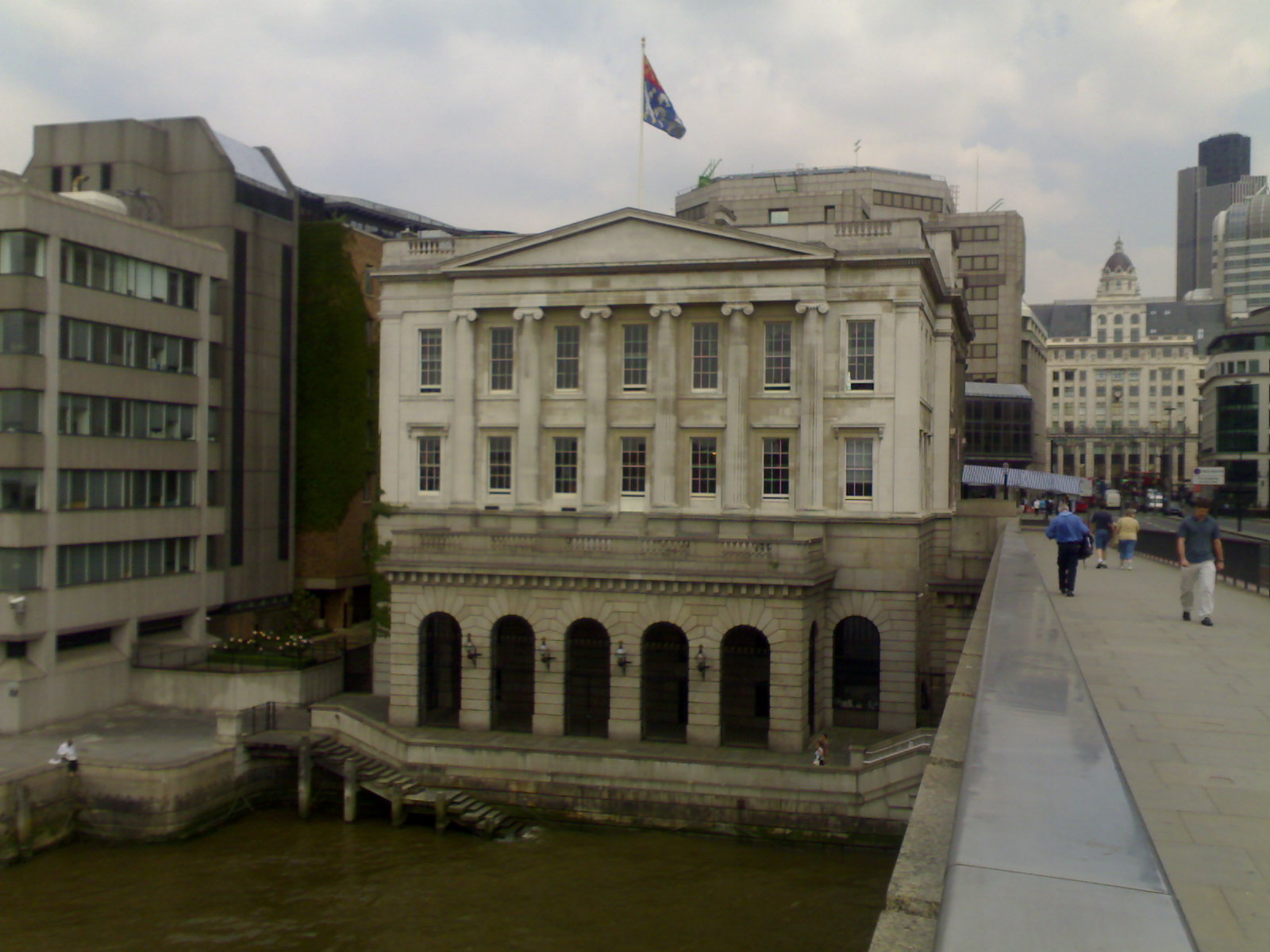
Fishmongers' Hall overlooking the Thames at London Bridge.

The Company's livery hall in the City of London is known as Fishmongers' Hall (sometimes shortened in common parlance to Fish Hall); its earliest recorded hall was built in 1310. A new hall, on the present site, was bequeathed to the Company in 1434. Together with 43 other livery halls, this one was destroyed in the Great Fire of London in 1666 and a replacement hall designed by the architect Edward Jerman opened in 1671. This hall by Jerman was demolished to facilitate the construction of the new London Bridge in 1827. The Fishmongers' next hall was designed by Henry Roberts (although his assistant, later the celebrated Sir Gilbert Scott, made the drawings) and built by William Cubitt & Company, opening in 1835. After severe bomb damage during the Blitz, Fishmongers' Hall was restored by Austen Hall (of Whinney, Son & Austen Hall) and reopened in 1951.

== Gresham's School ==
Since 1555, the Company has acted as the Trustee of Gresham's School at Holt, Norfolk, in accordance with the wishes of Lord Mayor Sir John Gresham (1492–1556), who endowed the school to the Company upon his death. Among other responsibilities, the Company now focuses on providing "life changing" bursaries for students.

== List of Prime Wardens ==
(Selection)

- c. 1370: Sir William Walworth
- 1664/1665: Abraham Johnson
- 1676/1677: William Allington
- 1721/1722: Sir John Fryer
- 1810–1812: Richard "Conversation" Sharp MP
- 1834–1836: Sir Matthew Wood
- 1863/1864: William Cubitt MP (died October 1863, et al. George Cubitt, 1st Baron Ashcombe)
- 1874/1875: Sir William Lawrence MP
- 1880/1881: Jethro Hornblower
- 1883/1884: Sir Thomas Dakin
- 1887/1888: Sir Andrew Lusk
- 1888/1889: Sir James Clarke Lawrence
- 1893/1894: John Warren, 3rd Baron de Tabley
- 1899/1900: Sir Richard Biddulph Martin
- 1901/1902: George Frederick Bodley RA
- 1902/1903: Edward Rawlings
- 1921/1922: Lothian Demain Nicholson
- 1925/1926: Lothian Demain Nicholson
- 1961/1962: Prince Philip, Duke of Edinburgh
- 1969/1970: Sir John Carew Pole
- 1972/1973: David, 5th Earl Cairns
- 1977/1978: Kenneth Mackay, 3rd Earl of Inchcape
- 1979/1980: Peter James Scott Lumsden CBE
- 1980/1981: John Eyre Norton
- 1989/1990: Robert, 3rd Baron Kindersley
- 1995/1996: Alexander McDonnell, 9th Earl of Antrim
- 1998/1999: The Hon. Sir Mark Lennox-Boyd
- 2000/2001: Merlin Hay, 24th Earl of Erroll
- 2001/2002: Sir Thomas Stockdale
- 2017/2018: Princess Anne, The Princess Royal
- 2019/2020: David Jones DL
- 2020/2022: Sir Alan Yarrow
- 2022/2023: Charles Spicer
- 2023/2024: Fred Stroyan
- 2024/2025: Andrew Sutcliffe KC
- 2025/2026: Simon Barrowcliff
- 2026/20267: Natalia Misciattelli Mocenigo Soranzo

== Guild Church ==
- St Magnus the Martyr

== Arms ==
Coat of arms of the Worshipful Company of Fishmongers
| Notes In heraldry, naiant means swimming to the viewer's left, while embowed means curved like a bow. For the meanings of argent, azure, or, proper and sable, see Tincture(s) Crest Upon a Helm on a Wreath Argent and Sable, two Cubit Arms the dexter vested Or cuffed Azure the sinister vested Azure cuffed Or the Hands Argent holding an Imperial Crown Proper. Escutcheon Azure three Dolphins naiant embowed in pale Argent finned toothed and crowned Or between two pairs of Stockfish in saltire Argent over the mouth of each Fish a Crown Or on a Chief Gules three pairs of Keys of St Peter in saltire. Supporters On the dexter side a Merman armed and holding in his right hand a Falchion and with his left sustaining the Helm and Timbre, and on the sinister side a Mermaid holding in her left hand a Mirror and supporting the Arms with her right hand, all Proper. Motto Al Worship be to God Alone (thus spelt, and shared with the Company's Gresham's School). |

== See also ==
- Shellfish Association of Great Britain
- Billingsgate Fish Market
- Gresham College
