= FTI Consulting =

American business consultancy firm

FTI Consulting, Inc.

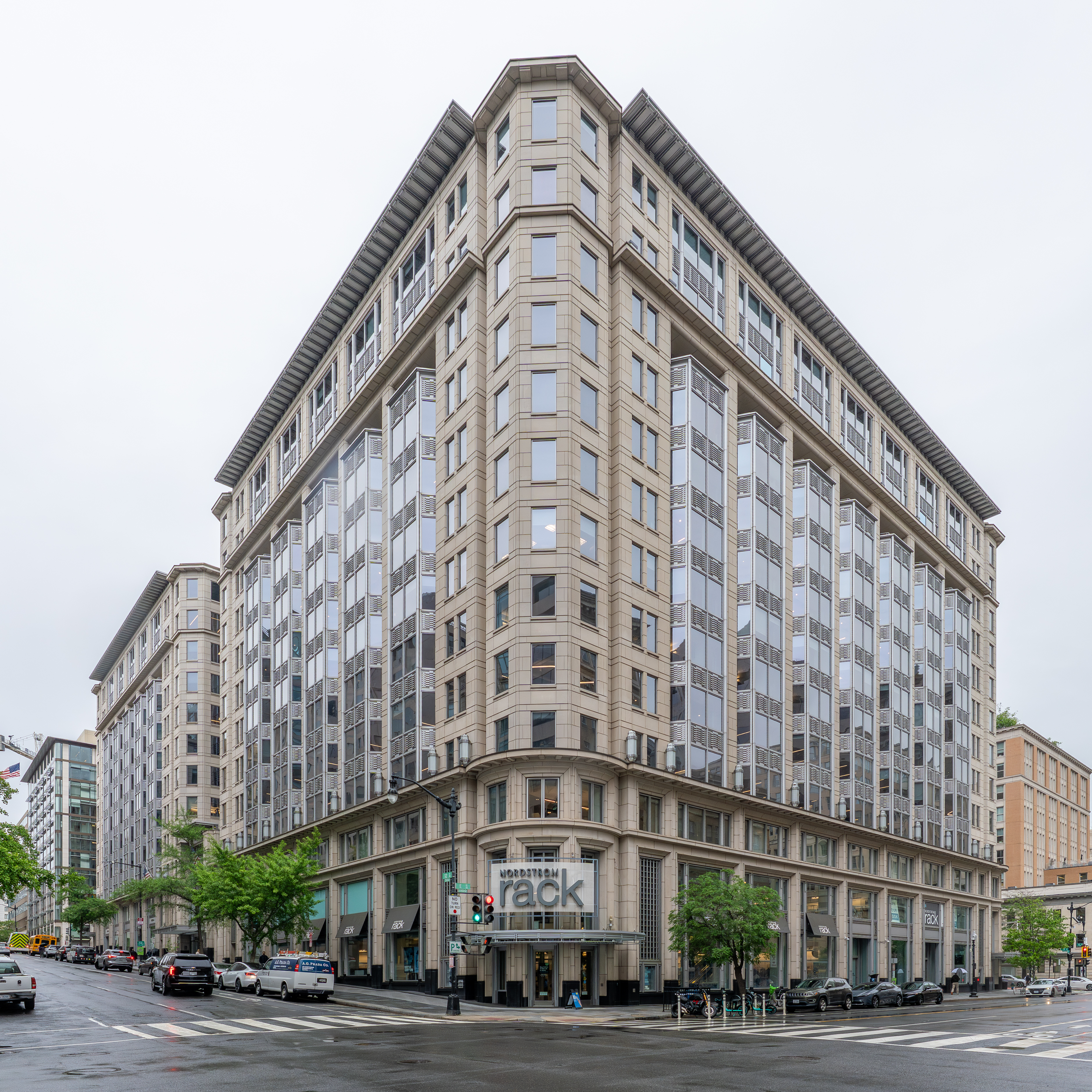
- Headquarters at the Thurman Arnold Building
- Type: Public company
- Traded as: NYSE: FCN; S&P 400 component
- Industry: Professional services
- Founded: 1982; 44 years ago (as Forensic Technologies International)
- Founders: Joe Reynolds; Dan Luczak
- Headquarters: Washington, D.C., U.S.
- Area served: Worldwide
- Key people: Steve Gunby (President and CEO)
- Services: Corporate finance & restructuring, economic consulting, forensic and litigation consulting, technology, strategic communications and strategy consulting
- Revenue: ▲US$3.79 billion (2025)
- Net income: ▼US$271 million (2025)
- Number of employees: 7,600+
- Website: fticonsulting.com

FTI Consulting (earlier Forensics Technologies International) is a business consultancy firm founded in 1982 and headquartered in Washington, D.C., United States. The company specializes in corporate finance and restructuring, economic consulting, forensic and litigation consulting, strategic communications, technology and strategy consulting. FTI Consulting employs more than 7,700 staff in 31 countries and is one of the largest financial consulting firms worldwide.

The firm was involved in the Lehman Brothers and General Motors bankruptcies, the investigation into the Bernard Madoff fraud, Bush v. Gore, the Major League Baseball steroid investigation, and public relations works for fossil fuel industry clients.

As of January 2020, FTI Consulting had the largest restructuring business in the US. As of December 31, 2023, FTI's clients include 98 of the world's top 100 law firms as ranked by The American Lawyer Global 100 list, 83 out of the Fortune 100 companies, 64 of the top 100 private equity firms on the Private Equity International 300 list and 38 out of the world's top 50 bank holding companies. In addition, FTI also serves a range of federal, state and local government agencies.

== History and acquisitions ==
Forensic Technologies International was founded in 1982 by two engineers, Joseph Reynolds and Daniel Luczak, to provide expert witnesses for litigation and visual presentations to demonstrate complex technical issues for juries. Luczak later served as FTI's chairman from 1992 to 1998. The company went public in May 1996, raising $11.1 million and debuting at $8.50 a share. It was one of the first litigation support companies to be publicly traded.

Forensic Technologies International rebranded itself as FTI Consulting in 1998, and in 1999 began trading on the New York Stock Exchange as FCN. After 1998, FTI's business focused increasingly on "financial surgery on troubled companies, either through bankruptcy proceedings or in workout situations with creditors."

The company added over 1,000 employees to its Forensic and Litigation Consulting ("FLC") division since the passing of the 2002 Sarbanes-Oxley Act, which excluded auditors from providing consulting work to their public clients. FTI Consulting purchased PricewaterhouseCoopers' U.S. Business Recovery Services Division ("BRS") for $250 million in 2002, which at the time was the largest provider of bankruptcy, turnaround, and business restructuring services in the United States. The company purchased KPMG's Dispute Advisory Services in 2003. The company purchased Chicago-based Compass Lexecon in 2003, maintaining the name as a subsidiary.

FTI acquired Ringtail Solutions Group in 2005. Ringtail's signature product, the Ringtail Discovery Software Suite, provides e-discovery and document management tools to assist corporations and law firms during litigation engagements. FTI acquired Attenex Corporation in 2008 and merged Attenex Patterns with Ringtail Discovery Software Suite to form Ringtail 8 E-discovery Software.

In 2006, the company acquired the London-based communications consultancy Financial Dynamics ("FD"). FD is now referred to as the Strategic Communications Division of FTI. In 2007, FTI expanded into Latin America and reported US$1 billion in annual revenue for the first time.

In 2008, FTI purchased the Schonbraun McCann Group, a real estate consulting firm based in New York, and Forensic Accounting, a forensic accounting practice based in the UK.

In 2010, FS Asia Advisory Limited was acquired in Hong Kong, expanding FTI's activities in Asia. In January 2014, FTI Consulting acquired London-based TLG Partners, which produced a series of annual thought leader indexes. In the same month, Steven H. Gunby was named the firm's new president and chief executive officer.

In 2012, FTI Consulting acquired KordaMentha partner, KordaMentha (Qld), starting its financial advisory business in Australia. In 2016, it acted as liquidator of Queensland Nickel and 2025, Mosaic Brands. In 2026, it acted as receiver and manager of David Jones and Cue on behalf of Hilco Capital.

In 2015, The Deal named FTI Consulting the world's top restructuring adviser to distressed companies.

In 2017, the company acquired the CDG Group, a leading restructuring advisory, turnaround management, value enhancement, and transaction advisory firm in New York.

In 2019, FTI Consulting acquired Andersch AG, a leading German restructuring and advisory firm, as part of its strategic expansion in Europe.

== Criticism and controversies ==
In 2020, the New York Times reported on FTI consulting's work for the fossil fuel industry. Reporting found that FTI had helped to design, staff and run organizations and websites funded by energy companies that were made to appear to represent grass-roots support for fossil-fuel initiatives.

In 2023, the company was hired by Johnny & Associates to manage a press conference addressing sexual abuse by its late founder Johnny Kitagawa. The Japanese public broadcaster NHK reported that the consulting firm had a 'blacklist' of journalists to avoid calling on during the event. FTI admitted the existence of the 'blacklist' as well as a list of reporters who should preferably be given a chance to ask a question. The firm also admitted the lists were given to the conference modulator. Their concern about some reporters who would spend long periods talking about their own opinions or ask thoughtless questions (or remarks) that could be unnecessarily stressful and painful to the victims watching the press conference was given as a reason to prepare the list. FTI told the press that their press conference policy was confirmed with the talent agency. On whether it is a good system to prepare such lists, Akihiro Nojiri, Senior Managing Director of Strategic Communications at FTI Consulting Japan Office, said, "Well, I don't think I am in a position to judge whether it is good or not."

== See also ==
- ArmorGroup
- Eurasia Group
- Le Beck International
- Pinkerton
- Edelman (firm)
- Finsbury (public relations)
- Teneo
