= Keat =

Keat is a surname. Notable people with this surname include:

- Keat Chhon (born 1934), Cambodian politician
- Dan Keat (born 1987), New Zealand football player
- Larissa Keat (born 1989), Swiss actress
- Preston Keat (born 1966), American political scientist
- Russell Keat, British political theorist

== See also ==
- KEAT (disambiguation)
- Keats (disambiguation)
