= Superpower =

Globally dominant political entity

Possible extant superpowers, or entities having the potential to become one in the near future—supported in varying degrees by academics (Note: The five entities included are those mentioned in Karataş 2021 paper, The United States: Is It Still a Superpower? where it stated, "While American scholars claim that the US is still the sole superpower, Chinese ones argue China is already a superpower. Also, Europeans fit the superpower title to the European Union (EU). In addition, Russia and India are seen as candidates for superpowerhood." Other sources have different lists of proposed modern superpowers.) United States China European Union India Russia

A superpower is a sovereign state or supranational union that holds a dominant position characterized by the ability to exert influence and project power on a global scale. Although there are no formal, universally accepted criteria, superpower status is generally achieved by combining hard power (economic means, military prowess, and technology) and soft power (political persuasion, cultural influence, and diplomacy). While a great power can exert its influence globally, superpowers are the ones so impactful that no significant action can be taken by the global community without first considering their positions. In this sense, superpowers are preeminent among the great powers; more narrowly, the term may be applied in specific contexts, such as energy superpower, economic superpower, or military superpower.

The term was coined in 1944 towards the end of World War II, referring to the United States, the British Empire, and the Soviet Union. Following the fallout of the Suez Canal Crisis and a period of rapid decolonization, the British Empire saw a steep decline, leaving the United States and the Soviet Union as the preeminent superpowers of the Cold War. With the dissolution of the Soviet Union in 1991, the United States emerged as the sole dominant power across multiple domains— a position sometimes referred to as a hyperpower.

Today, scholarly discourse and public perception on superpower status vary widely, with some considering the concept obsolete. There is no overall consensus on which entities are contemporary superpowers, with sources frequently using the term to describe the United States, China, the European Union, and Russia. In addition, India and Brazil are sometimes discussed as a potential superpower in the near future, with one source calling India a candidate for "superpowerhood."

== Definitions and etymology ==
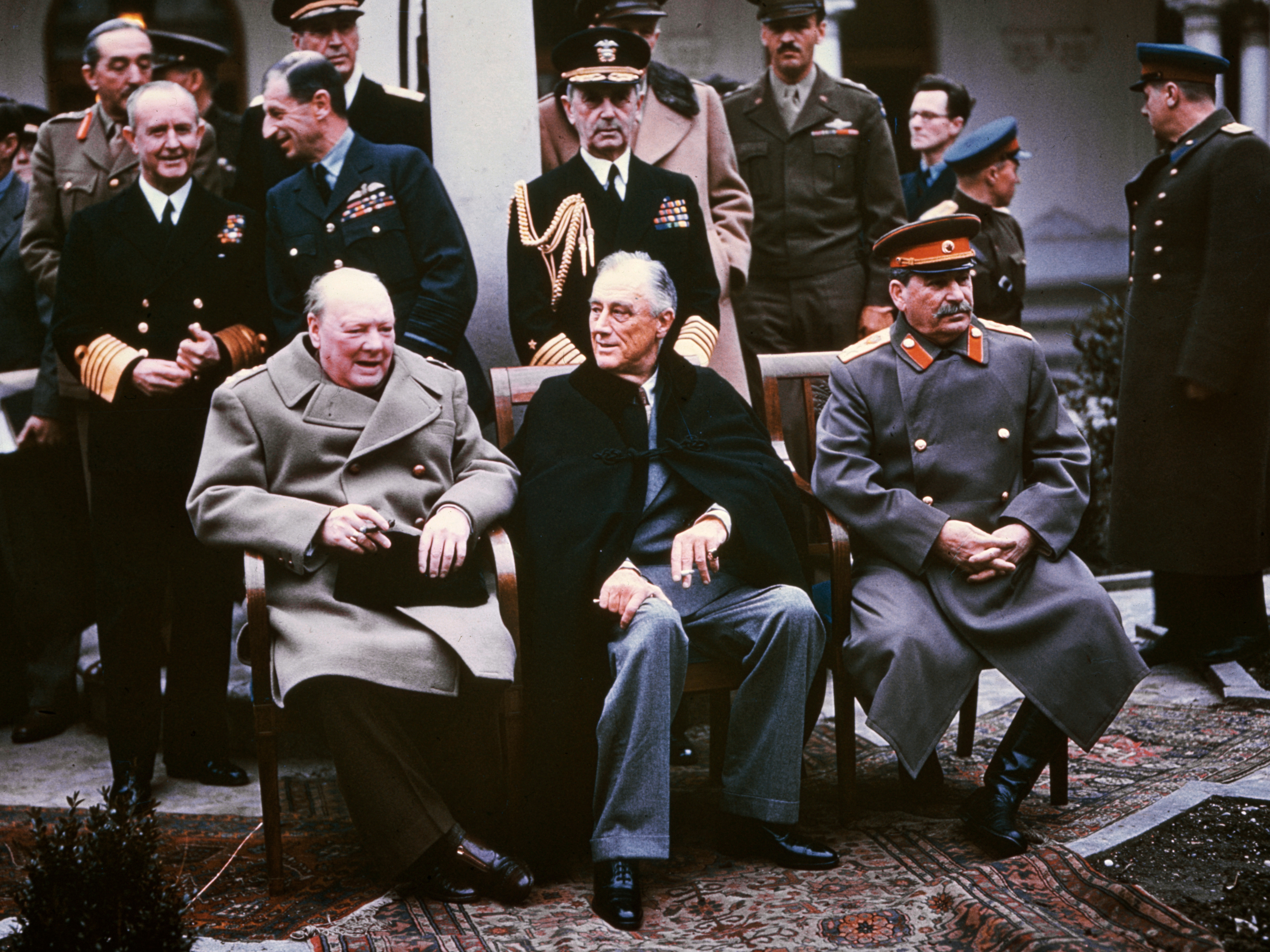
Prime Minister Winston Churchill, President Franklin D. Roosevelt, and General Secretary Joseph Stalin, meeting at the Yalta Conference in Crimea in February 1945, near the end of World War II

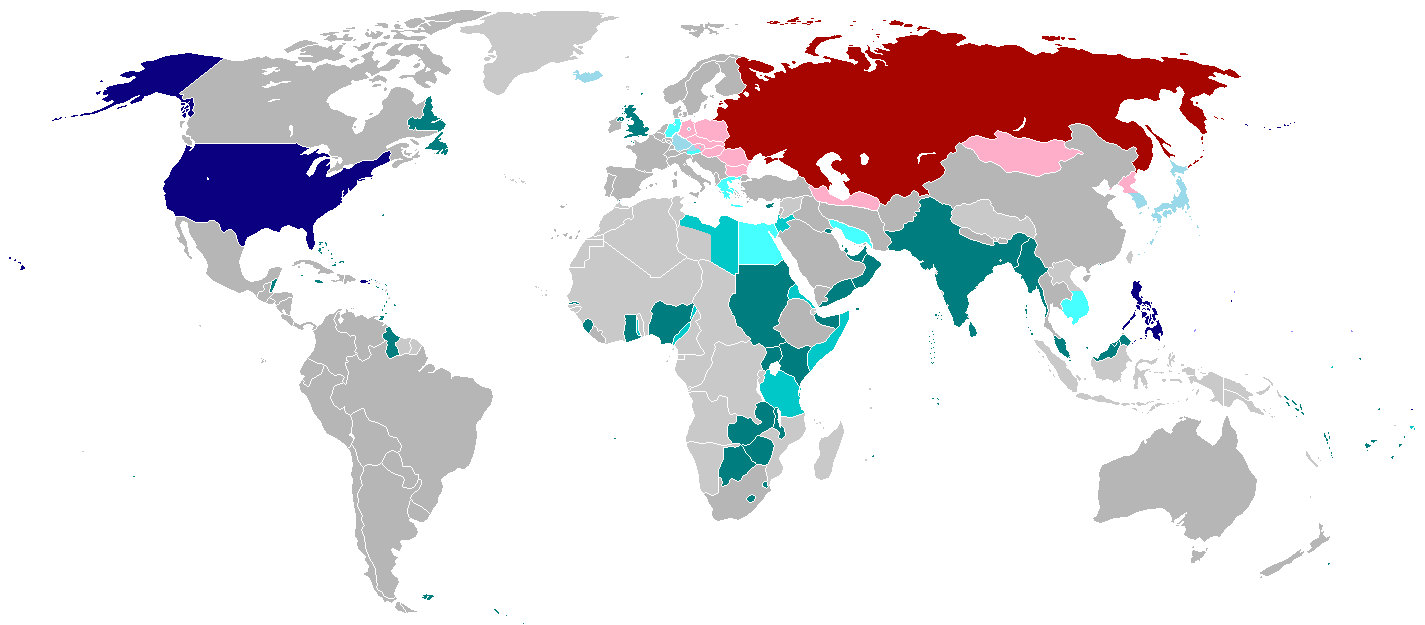
A world map in 1945. According to William T. R. Fox, the United States (blue), the Soviet Union (red), and the British Empire (teal) were superpowers.

The term was first used to describe nations with greater than great power status as early as 1944, but only gained its specific meaning with regard to the United States and the Soviet Union after World War II. This was because the United States and the Soviet Union had proved themselves to be capable of casting great influence in global politics and military dominance. The term in its current political meaning was coined by Dutch-American geostrategist Nicholas Spykman in a series of lectures in 1943 about the potential shape of a new post-war world order. This formed the foundation for the book The Geography of the Peace, which referred primarily to the unmatched maritime global supremacy of the British Empire and the United States as essential for peace and prosperity in the world.

A year later, William T. R. Fox, an American foreign policy professor, elaborated on the concept in the book The Superpowers: The United States, Britain and the Soviet Union – Their Responsibility for Peace which spoke of the global reach of a super-empowered nation. Fox used the word superpower to identify a new category of power able to occupy the highest status in a world in which—as the war then raging demonstrated—states could challenge and fight each other on a global scale. According to him, at that moment, three states were superpowers - the United States, the Soviet Union, and the United Kingdom. Nonetheless, Britain's empire would gradually dissolve over the course of the 20th century, sharply reducing its global power projections.

Criteria of what counts as a superpower vary. However, a common characteristic that is consistent among most definitions of a superpower is a sovereign state or supranational organization that has mastered the seven dimensions of state power, namely geography, population, economy, resources, military, diplomacy, and national identity. According to Lyman Miller, the basic components of superpower stature may be measured along four axes of power: military, economic, political, and cultural (referred to as 'soft power' by political scientist Joseph Nye). Kim Richard Nossal believes that the term refers to a continental-sized political community with a relatively sizable population, having a superordinate economic capacity, which includes ample domestic food supplies and natural resources. It retains autonomy in international affairs, and possesses a well-developed nuclear capacity (notably second strike capability). Paul Dukes defines a superpower to be a state capable of conducting a global strategy, including the possibility of destroying the world; commanding vast economic potential and influence; and presenting a universal ideology, although many modifications may be made to this basic definition. June Teufel Dreyer similarly requires that a country be able to project its power, soft and hard, globally to qualify as a superpower. In his book Superpower: Three Choices for America's Role in the World, Ian Bremmer argues that a superpower is a country that can exert enough military, political, and economic power to persuade nations in every region of the world to take important actions they would not otherwise take. In a 2021 paper, Le Hai Binh argued that quantifiable metrics are insufficient to definitively designate superpower status; a superpower must make investments in the international community by providing public goods, either to the entire international community or a narrow group of allies. By taking on burdens other entities are unable or unwilling to bear, superpowers exert influence, shape international norms, gain respect, and cooperation from other entities.

Apart from its common denotation of the foremost post-WWII states, the term superpower has colloquially been applied by some authors retrospectively to describe various preeminent ancient great empires or medieval great powers, in works such as Channel 5 (UK)'s documentary Rome: The World's First Superpower or the reference in The New Cambridge Medieval History to "the other superpower, Sasanian Persia".

The term superpower is also adopted as a rhetorical device for domestic messaging and international branding. Sweden, usually associated with middle-power dynamics, self-identifies as a moral superpower for its liberal, welfare-state, social-democratic tradition; in Norway, Jan Egeland used humanitarian superpower rhetoric to solidify domestic support for humanitarian efforts abroad.

== Historical perspectives ==
=== Hegemons from antiquity to the 18th century ===
Even though superpower is a 20th-century concept, some historians retrospectively apply it to some regionally dominant historical empires, such as the Carthaginian Republic, the Roman Empire, and East Asia's Tang dynasty.

By the late 15th century, the Age of Discovery brought about an early form of globalization, connecting previously isolated parts of the world for the first time. The first colonial empires of the early modern age emerged, such as the Portuguese, Spanish (whose Spanish dollar was the main reserve currency from 1530 to 1640), Dutch and French (whose Livre tournois and French franc were the main reserve currency from 1720 to 1815) empires. In particular, the British Empire, after its Glorious Revolution in 1688 and its pioneering role in the Industrial Revolution in the 18th century would lead to its later global hegemony.

According to historical statistics and research from the OECD, until the early modern period, Western Europe, China, and India accounted for roughly two thirds of the world's GDP.

=== Pax Britannica: British dominance between 1815 and 1914 ===
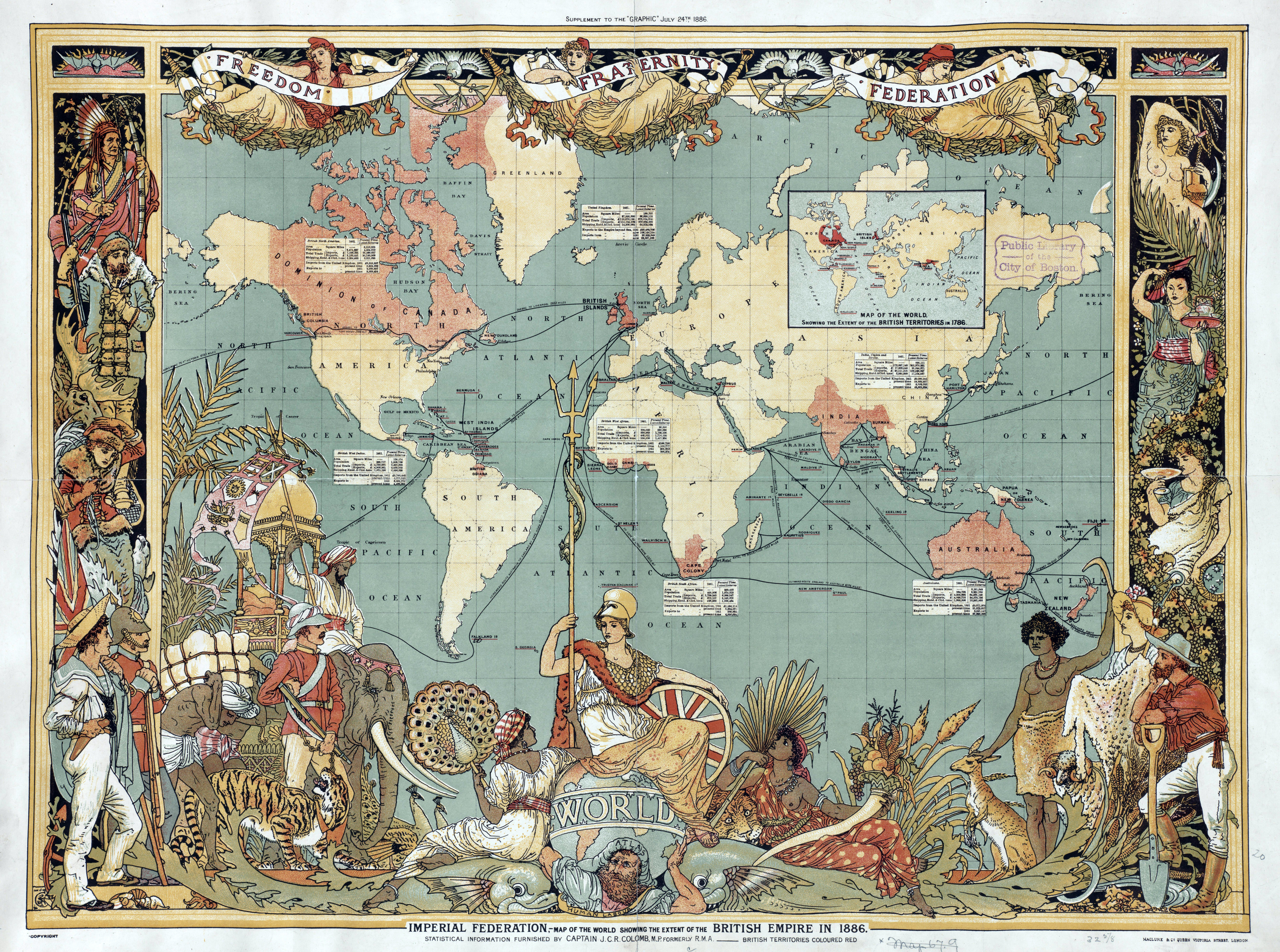
Map of the world showing the extent of the British Empire in 1886

Following the conclusion of the Napoleonic Wars in 1815, the British Empire enjoyed trading primacy, expanding its overseas empire and asserting maritime dominance in most of the world's trading sea lanes. At its peak, it was the most extensive empire in world history and considered the foremost power,

holding sway over 25% of the world's population. Controlling 24% of the Earth's total land area, it was described as the empire on which the sun never sets. Its currency, the British Pound, was the main reserve currency from 1815 to 1920.

However, at the turn of the 20th century, Britain's economic lead was challenged by Germany and the United States, amid rising tensions with the former. When the First World War broke out, Britain relied heavily on its empire to support its war effort. The conflict placed enormous strain on its military, financial, and manpower resources. Even though victory in the war brought Britain to its largest territorial extent, it was no longer the world's preeminent power, as the United States matched or surpassed Britain in industrial and military strength.

=== Cold War ===
This map shows two global spheres during the Cold War in 1980: NATO member states Other NATO and United States allies × Anti-communist guerrillas Warsaw Pact member states Socialist states allied with the Soviet Union and the Warsaw Pact Other allies of the Soviet Union × Communist guerrillas Socialist states not allied with the Soviet Union and the Warsaw Pact Neutral nations × Other conflicts

The UK faced serious political, financial, and colonial issues after World War II and struggled to match expanding American and Soviet power. It entered the postwar Age of Austerity and endured a harsh Winter of 1946–47. Facing fiscal difficulties, it took out the Anglo-American loan in 1946; the following year saw the independence of British India. The Suez Crisis of 1956 is regarded as the beginning of the end of Britain's period as a superpower. Financially weakened by the two world wars, it could no longer pursue its foreign policy objectives on an equal footing with the new superpowers without sacrificing convertibility of its reserve currency as a central goal of policy.

On the other hand, as the majority of World War II had been fought far from its shores, the United States had not suffered the industrial destruction or massive civilian casualties that marked the wartime situation of the countries in Europe or Asia. The war had reinforced the position of the United States as the world's largest long-term creditor nation and its principal supplier of goods; moreover, it had built up a strong industrial and technological infrastructure that had greatly advanced its military strength into a primary position on the global stage.

Despite attempts to create multinational coalitions or legislative bodies (such as the United Nations), it became increasingly clear that the superpowers had very different visions about what the post-war world ought to look like and after the withdrawal of British aid to Greece in 1947, the United States took the lead in containing Soviet expansion in the Cold War.

The two countries opposed each other ideologically, politically, militarily, and economically. The Soviet Union promoted the ideology of Marxism–Leninism, planned economy, and a one-party state while the United States promoted the ideologies of liberal democracy and the free market in a capitalist market economy. This was reflected in the Warsaw Pact and NATO military alliances, respectively, as most of Europe became aligned with either the United States or the Soviet Union. These alliances implied that these two nations were part of an emerging bipolar world, in contrast with a previously multipolar world.

The idea that the Cold War period revolved around only two blocs, or even only two nations, has been challenged by some scholars in the post–Cold War era, who have noted that the bipolar world only exists if one ignores all of the various movements and conflicts that occurred without influence from either of the two superpowers. For example, in the 1980s, some commentators thought Japan would become a superpower due to its large GDP and high economic growth at the time. However, Japan's economy crashed in 1991, creating a long period of economic slump in the country which has become known as the Lost Decades. Additionally, much of the conflict between the superpowers was fought in proxy wars, which more often than not involved issues more complex than the standard Cold War oppositions.

In the late 1980s, the idea of superpower disengagement, a concept where superpowers reduce their interventions in an area, began to be discussed in relation to the U.S. and U.S.S.R. in Europe. These attempts were meant to defuse tensions between the Soviet Union and the United States, largely because of the risk of any superpower conflict escalating to nuclear war. Examples of this included the Austrian State Treaty, which left Austria as neutral for the duration of the Cold War, with Austria staying out of the Warsaw Pact, NATO, and the European Economic Community and the 1952 Stalin Note, which proposed superpower disengagement from Germany.

=== Post–Cold War era ===
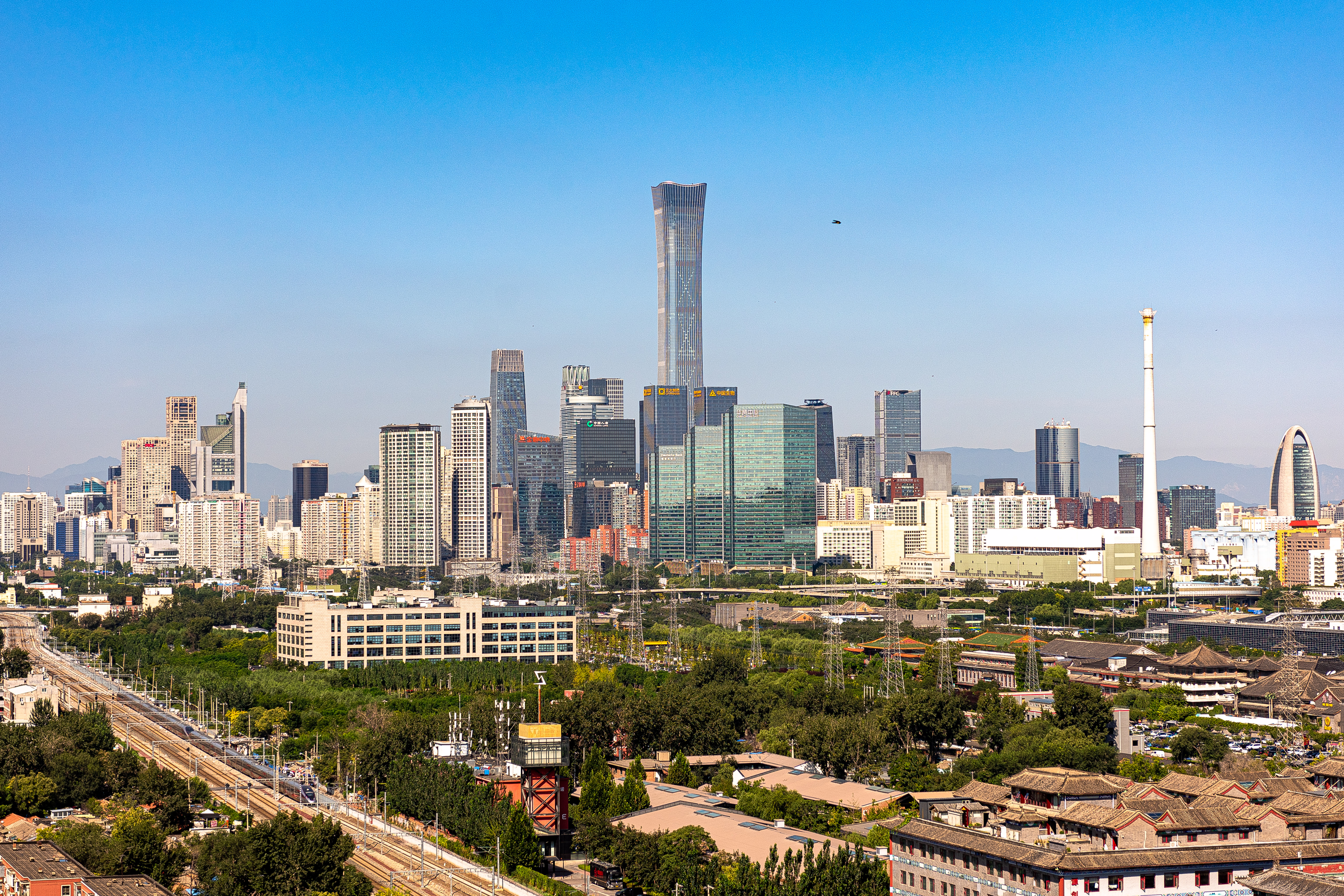
Beijing houses the largest number of Fortune Global 500 companies in the world, as well as the world's four biggest financial institutions by total assets, demonstrating China's concentration of corporate, financial, and state directed economic power.

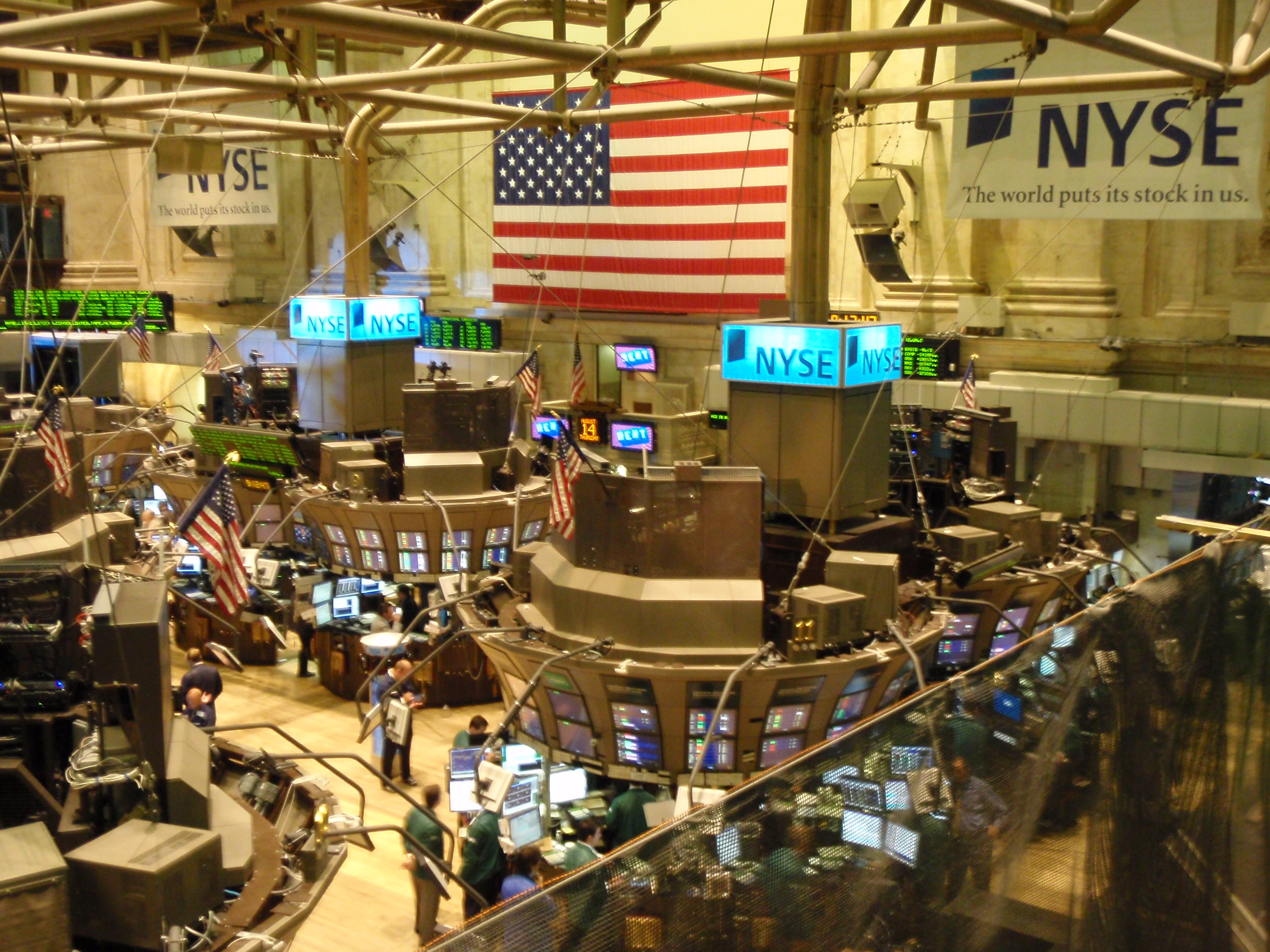
The New York Stock Exchange trading floor. Economic power such as a large nominal GDP and a world reserve currency are important factors in the projection of hard power.

After the dissolution of the Soviet Union in 1991 which ended the Cold War, the post–Cold War world was considered by some to be a unipolar world, with the United States as the world's sole remaining superpower. The term "hyperpower", as popularized by French foreign minister Hubert Védrine in the late 1990s, was used to describe the country.

Yet this view was controversial, and the validity of classifying the United States in this way is disputed. One notable opponent to this theory is political scientist and author Samuel P. Huntington, who rejects this theory in favor of a multipolar balance of power. In 1999, he wrote: "The United States, of course, is the sole state with preeminence in every domain of power – economic, military, diplomatic, ideological, technological, and cultural – with the reach and capabilities to promote its interests in virtually every part of the world". However, Huntington rejected the claim that the world was unipolar, arguing: "There is now only one superpower. But that does not mean that the world is unipolar", describing it instead as "a strange hybrid, a uni-multipolar system with one superpower and several major powers". He further wrote that "Washington is blind to the fact that it no longer enjoys the dominance it had at the end of the Cold War. It must relearn the game of international politics as a major power, not a superpower, and make compromises".

In After the Empire: The Breakdown of the American Order (2001), French sociologist Emmanuel Todd predicted the eventual decline and fall of the United States as a superpower, stating "After years of being perceived as a problem-solver, the US itself has now become a problem for the rest of the world." Other international relations theorists such as Henry Kissinger theorized that because the threat of the Soviet Union no longer existed to formerly American-dominated regions such as Western Europe and Japan, American influence had been declining since the end of the Cold War because such regions no longer needed protection or had necessarily similar foreign policies as the United States. Some held that this older single-superpower assessment of global politics was too simplified, in part because of the difficulty in classifying the European Union at its stage of development., while others argued that the notion of a superpower was outdated, considering complex global economic interdependencies, and proposed that the world was becoming multipolar.

== Contemporary views ==
Today, scholarly discourse and public perception of superpower status and criteria vary widely. Karataş notes that the national origin of a scholar may sway what entities they consider superpowers. In a multipolar world where traditional power concentration matters less, deepening cross-border interdependence has led some to argue that the term may be obsolete. Nonetheless, academic literature and news media still use the term regularly to describe modern geopolitical dynamics, and others dispute the significance of a multipolar world.

A 2026 Institute for Economics and Peace report titled The Great Fragmentation: The rise of Middle Powers in a fractured international order argued that during the 21st century superpowers have plateaued in influence, great powers have declined, and the influence of middle powers has increased. The report stated this trend started after 2008 financial crisis, and referred to it as the "Great Fragmentation." Based on the metrics and criteria they used, they argued that middle powers collectively exceeded great powers, and that superpowers might struggle to exert influence as more countries gained influence and became harder to group.

=== United States ===
Countries hosting military bases and facilities of the United States. U.S. military bases across the world have been cited in discussion of its superpower status.

Many sources consider the United States a superpower, primarily due to its alliances, military capacity, soft power, and economic influence, while some critics believe that due to a decline in relative power, the U.S. no longer meets the criteria to be considered a superpower. As a result of asymmetric polarization within the United States, as well as globally perceived U.S. foreign policy failures, and China's growing influence around the world, some academics and geopolitical experts have argued that the United States may already be experiencing a decay in its soft power around the world.

A 2012 report by the National Intelligence Council predicted that the United States superpower status will have eroded to merely being first among equals by 2030, but that it would remain highest among the world's most powerful countries because of its influence in many different fields and global connections that the great regional powers of the time would not match. Additionally, some experts have suggested the possibility of the United States losing its superpower status completely in the future, citing speculation of its decline in power relative to the rest of the world, economic hardships, a declining dollar, Cold War allies becoming less dependent on the United States, and the emergence of future powers around the world. In a 2025 article titled The U.S. is no longer a superpower published in The Globe and Mail, Jennifer Welsh characterized U.S. and China relations as a confrontation between great powers, stating "What is left is the U.S. as great power, in that 19th-century sense, where the term “great” reflects a mathematical calculation of raw capability and territorial ambition."

=== China ===
GDP relative to other countries is cited in discussions about potential superpower status.

The subject of China as a superpower has been a matter of academic and geopolitical debate since at least the 2000s. As early as the 2010s, some academics, economists, politicians, and journalists argued that China had achieved superpower status, had the potential to be one in the future, or applied terms like economic superpower to describe China. Others maintain that China is potential superpower, or that it has not met the criteria.

In its 2025 Asia Power Index report, the Lowy Institute classified China as a superpower. In 2025, incoming Secretary of State Marco Rubio referred to China as a superpower during his congressional nomination hearing while President Donald Trump referred to China as a superpower before meeting with President Xi Jinping in 2026. Proponents of the position that China is a superpower argue that China possesses a major influence in geopolitics, technology, manufacturing, and economic power. It is the world's largest manufacturer, the largest economy by purchasing power parity, and has the second largest economy by nominal GDP. Militarily, the nation possesses the largest military in terms of active personnel and the third largest nuclear stockpile. Proponents have highlighted China's modern military, global influence, cultural export, rapid advancements in artificial intelligence, economic strength, and manufacturing volume as signs of global dominance in the 2020s. One paper's authors projected China would be a peer competitor to the United States that could not be contained and would be a far more challenging entity for the West to confront. The authors stated that China's military dominance in the Asia-Pacific was already eroding American influence rapidly, and that the costs for the US to defend its interests there would continue to rise. Some sources argue that China's economic influence had long since broken out of its regional confines and was on track to directly contest the US role as the center of economic trade and commerce.

Meanwhile, some argue that domestic and international challenges persist and that China does not meet the criteria to be considered a superpower. These include an aging and shrinking population, lack of skilled immigration, alongside international concerns of its soft power status due to human rights issues, lack of hard power capabilities through a global military alliance system, low GDP per capita, and the dominance of the U.S. dollar in global trade. In an opinion article published in The Hill, professor of international relations Andrew Latham argued that, "While China is unquestionably both a regional power and a great power, when it comes to superpower status, it simply doesn’t make the cut." A 2025 article published by Jennifer Welsh referred to China as one of "the world’s two great powers."

=== Russia ===
Top five countries by military expenditure in 2023.

Military spending is cited in discussions about superpower status.

Russia is often discussed as a possible superpower, or having the potential to become one in the near future. Russia inherited much of the status and military arsenal of the Soviet Union, including status as a nuclear-weapon state. This nuclear arsenal allowed Russia to exert political and diplomatic influence despite the economic and military decline following the collapse of the USSR. Experts debate if Russia remains a superpower, and a Gallup survey of 39,760 people from 37 countries found that 41% percent believed Russia will be a superpower in 2030. Due to Russia's demonstrated capabilities of conventional warfare during the Russian invasion of Ukraine, Russia was compared to a "Potemkin Superpower" by Paul Krugman. Increasing doubts have emerged since 2022 around the potential of Russia to gain superpower status given its declining economy, severe military underperformance during the invasion of Ukraine, inability to successfully defend its allies in Syria and in the Sahel, and its loss of influence in Central Asia, a region once dominated by Moscow for centuries. In a 2025 Asia Power Index report, the Lowy Institute classified Russia as a "middle power," and a 2026 IEP report classified it as a "great power." Despite this, Russia generally identifies as a superpower, and some sources continue to use the label of superpower when discussing it. For example, a 2025 paper cited the Ukraine conflict as challenging the singular superpower status of the United States, and named the US, China, and Russia as the worlds three superpowers. A 2019 poll conducted by the Levada Center found that the number of Russians who believed Russia was a superpower had increased from 30 percent in 2005 to 75 percent. The status as the largest sovereign state by land area, coupled with the natural resources that it provides, serves as part of the basis for this belief.

According to a RAND Corporation paper by American diplomat James Dobbins, Professor Howard J. Shatz, and policy analyst Ali Wyne, Russia in the breakdown of a disintegrating unipolar world order, while not a peer competitor to the United States, would still remain a player and a potential rogue state that would undermine global affairs. The West could contain Russia with methods like those employed during the Cold War with the Soviet Union, though this would be tested by Russia's overt and covert efforts to destabilize Western alliances and political systems.

=== European Union ===
Eurozone participation European Union member states (special territories not shown) 21 in the eurozone 1 in ERM II, with an opt-out (Denmark) 5 not in ERM II, but committed to join the eurozone after meeting the convergence criteria (Czech Republic, Hungary, Poland, Romania, and Sweden) Non–EU member states 4 using the euro with a monetary agreement (Andorra, Monaco, San Marino, and Vatican City) 2 using the euro unilaterally (Kosovo and Montenegro)

The European Union is often discussed as a possible superpower, or having the potential to become one in the near future, due to their large markets, growing military strength, economic potential, and influence in international affairs. In 2002, Andrew Moravcsik referred to the EU as "The Quiet Superpower," addressing criticism that a superpower needs to have significant military capacity by arguing that the EUs economic and diplomatic influence are adequate to qualify it as one. Moravcik reiterated this in 2009 and 2010, where he argued the EU and US were the world's only two superpowers, stating in 2010:

There are, and will remain for the foreseeable future, two global superpowers: the United States and Europe. Only these two actors are consistently able to project a full spectrum of ‘smart power’ internationally.

— Andrew Moravcsik

Despite lacking a cohesive military of its own, with military capabilities still in the hands of individual member states, it has been argued that this is irrelevant when considering the EU's status as a potential superpower. Others disagree, saying that its lack of a unified military structure compared to the United States undermines its claim to be a potential superpower.

There have also been conflicting views about the EU's lack of political integration. Some have argued that its "lower profile" diplomacy and emphasis on the rule of law represent a new kind of geopolitical influence that fulfills the political requirements for consideration as a superpower, rather than simply failing to meet them. Others however argue that its lack of a centralized foreign or defense policy leaves its effectiveness uncertain when compared to that of a more politically integrated union of states such as the United States, and it has even been argued that the EU is little more than an extension of a Europe reliant on or dominated by the United States.

In 2020, the European Union has been called a "regulatory superpower" due to the Brussels effect. İbrahim Karataş stated that some scholars argue the EU is a superpower based on its economy, but because economics are not adequate to justify superpower status, there are conflicting views. Karatas also stated that in terms of softpower "the EU is indeed a superpower."

=== India ===
India is often discussed as a possible superpower, or having the potential to become one in the near future, given its large markets, growing military strength, economic potential, and influence in international affairs, is often evaluated for its status and potential as a 21st-century superpower. In 2011, the International Encyclopedia of Political Science stated that "perhaps India in time, could also lay some claim to being, or over time becoming, superpowers of a sort." A 2021 paper by İbrahim Karataş included India as a candidate for "superpowerhood." In the 2025 Asia Power Index report, the Lowy Institute classified India as a "major power." A 2026 IEP report concluded that India was a great power and projected that it was the only one that would experience significant economic growth.

Multiple opinions have pointed towards India's rapid economic development as a reason for it to be considered a potential superpower, in particular during the 2010s when it was predicted to outpace China's growth into the future. Some commentators made the prediction of India becoming a superpower by 2020, most notably based on A. P. J. Abdul Kalam's book India 2020. Economists and researchers at Harvard University have projected India's 7% projected annual growth rate through 2024 would continue to put it ahead of China, making India the fastest growing economy in the world. Over and above, India also has the advantage of having a very large and growing young population with a median age of 28, compared to China's median age of 40. In 2003 Goldman Sachs predicted that India would become an economic superpower by 2050. In a 2024 interview with The Independent, former UK PM Tony Blair predicted that by 2050 India would be a 'global superpower' along with the United States and China. In 2025 Former UK PM Rishi Sunak suggested India is an 'economic superpower'.

While India’s economic growth has continued, some analysts note that inequality remains high and that its trade potential is more limited compared to regional competitors such as China. Although India briefly became the world’s fastest-growing major economy in 2015, its growth rate has fallen below China’s since 2018. Since 2021, India's economy has grown faster than China's and remains the fastest growing major economy.

It has also been argued that India's government and bureaucracy is geared against emerging as a superpower, with it being argued that it "does very little collective thinking about its long-term foreign policy goals, since most of the strategic planning that takes place within the government happens on an individual level". Following the years of Premiership of Narendra Modi, the perception towards India's potential in becoming a superpower has significantly changed downwards. In 2017, a study for the London School of Economics by nine experts of Indian economy, defence, government, culture, environment and society concluded that India is not likely to become a superpower and should not desire to become one. In 2023, economist Ashoka Mody wrote, "China has a plausible path through its current muddle. India, by contrast, risks falling into blind alleys of unfounded optimism."

=== Brazil ===
The Federative Republic of Brazil has seen limited discussion among authorities regarding its potential as a superpower. Writing for The Diplomatic Courier, former British Ambassador to Brazil, Peter Collecott, identifies that Brazil's recognition as a potential superpower largely stems from its own national identity and ambition. Collecott points out that for the past two hundred years Brazil has sought to emerge as a serious global economic and political power, a position "that [Brazil] instinctively feels is her due." However, Collecott also argues that while Brazil has certainly fulfilled some of its aspirations and finally started to gain the international recognition it deserves, it perhaps won't quite emerge as a superpower; instead, its current position as an emerging power will allow Brazil to shape the future with more realistic aspirations.

In his 2014 publication, The BRICs Superpower Challenge: Foreign and Security Policy Analysis, professor Kwang Ho Chun assesses the likelihood of the BRICs countries attaining superpower status. Regarding Brazil, Kwang Ho Chun highlights that the country possesses enormous and almost untouched "strategic" natural resources, including valuable minerals, a tenth of the world's fresh water and Earth's largest remaining rainforest. Because of this, Kwang Ho Chun believes Brazil could gain a dominant role in international relations, especially on environmental issues. This soft power influence is further enhanced by Brazil's policy makers seeking to engage in as many international organizations as possible and forming alliances, most notably on social, diplomatic and economic issues. Despite its economic potential and Brazil's "self-image as a country with a great destiny," Kwang Ho Chun believes that the country "falls far short of the levels required for a superpower." Supporting his belief, he emphasizes Brazil's apparent lack of "traditional hard power" (i.e. military power and global security influence) as a major obstacle. Kwang Ho Chun writes that Brazil has "little incentive to invest in its military" as "the country developed in an environment with hardly any inter-state security threats", therefore Brazil "may never be in a position to accumulate enough influence on global security matters to meet the criteria of being a superpower." Instead, Ho Chun feels that Brazil will emerge as a great power with an important position in some spheres of influence but limited in others such as international security.

In 2023, geopolitical analyst Matija Šerić wrote, "Although the current situation is not bright, when considering the long-term perspective, with a lot of work and reforms, the Brazilian people and the country can only string success after success." He added, "In addition to enormous natural, material and human resources, the advantage of Brazilians is that they have a democratic state that provides political, media and other freedoms. Brazil can become a superpower that can strongly contribute to the construction of a fairer multipolar world, and the prerequisite for this is internal stability and a government that will be politically prudent, economically expert, but also transparent and non-corrupt."

== See also ==
- American Century – Term for American geopolitical dominance
- Group of Two – Informal grouping of the United States and China
- Historic recurrence – Repetition of similar events in history
- International relations theory – Study of international relations from a theoretical perspective
- List of modern great powers – List of great powers from the early modern period to the post-Cold War era
- Megacorporation – Massive, monopolistic corporation active in multiple markets
- Small power – Term for a class of states

== Bibliography ==
- Belt, Don (2004). "Europe's Big Gamble". National Geographic. pp. 54–65.
- Brzezinski, Zbigniew (1997). The Grand Chessboard: American Primacy and Its Geostrategic Imperatives. New York: Basic Books. ISBN 0-465-02726-1.
- Fox, William (1944). The Super-powers: the United States, Britain, and the Soviet union—their responsibility for peace. Harcourt, Brace a. Co.
- Litwin Henryk, Central European Superpower, BUM Magazine, October 2016.
- Kamen, Henry (2003). Spain's Road To Empire: The Making Of A World Power, 1492–1763. Penguin Books.
- Kennedy, Paul (1988). The Rise and Fall of the Great Powers. Knopf Doubleday Publishing. ISBN 0-679-72019-7.
- McCormick, John, John (2007). The European Superpower. Palgrave Macmillan.
- Erik Ringmar, "The Recognition Game: Soviet Russia Against the West," Cooperation & Conflict, 37:2, 2002. pp. 115–36. – an explanation of the relations between the superpowers in the 20th century based on the notion of recognition.
- Sicilia, David B.; Wittner, David G. Strands of Modernization: The Circulation of Technology and Business Practices in East Asia, 1850–1920 (University of Toronto Press, 2021) online review
- Todd, Emanuel. After the Empire – The Breakdown of the American Order.
- Védrine, Hubert. France in an Age of Globalization, Brookings Institution Press, 2001. ISBN 0-8157-0007-5.
- Li, Bo; Zheng Yin (Chinese) (2001) 5000 years of Chinese history, Inner Mongolian People's publishing corp, ISBN 7-204-04420-7.
