= Keast =

Keast may refer to:

== People ==
- Jackie Keast, editor of If Magazine, an Australian film industry magazine
- James Allen Keast (1922–2009), Australian ornithologist
- William Keast (New South Wales politician) (1872–1938), member of the New South Wales Legislative Assembly
- William Keast (Victorian politician) (1866–1927), member of the Victorian Legislative Assembly

== Other uses ==
- Keast Park, a park in Seaford, Victoria, Australia

== See also ==
- Keaster, a slang term for buttocks
- Keast's tube-nosed fruit bat
- Keats (disambiguation)
