= Social harmony =

Social harmony may refer to:

- Group cohesiveness, the strength of bonds linking members of a social group to one another and to the group as a whole
- The opposite of class conflict
- Harmonious Society, a Chinese socioeconomic concept associated with Hu Jintao
