= Superpower: Three Choices for America's Role in the World =

Book by Ian Bremmer

- Author: Ian Bremmer
- Language: English
- Genre: Politics, international affairs
- Publisher: Portfolio (Penguin Group)
- Publication date: May 2015
- Publication place: United States
- Media type: Hardback
- Pages: 226 p. (hardback edition)
- ISBN: 978-1-59184-747-2

Superpower: Three Choices for America's Role in the World is a 2015 non-fiction book by Eurasia Group president Ian Bremmer that offers an analysis of the foreign policy of the United States since the end of the Cold War, and possible ways forward.

In Superpower, Bremmer argues that ordinary Americans too often base their foreign policy choices on allegiance or opposition to the party in power. He, therefore, outlines three options for readers to consider what sort of country America should be and how it should use its superpower status, in order to strengthen the nation's commitment to a more coherent strategy in the world:

- Independent America: asserts that it's time for the US to declare independence from international burdens. Instead, Americans should lead by example – in part, by improving the country from within and tapping into its own latent potential.
- Moneyball America: acknowledges that Washington can't meet every international challenge. The priority must be to focus on opportunities and to defend US interests where they're threatened. Without imposing its values on anyone, the US should help its allies in ways that make America more secure and prosperous.
- Indispensable America: argues that only America can defend the values on which global stability increasingly depends. In today's interdependent, hyper-connected world, a turn inward would undermine America's own security and prosperity. Indispensable America is the most costly option. However, failing to protect US values and basic freedoms across the world presents the greater risk.

According to Bremmer, a "superpower" is a country that can exert enough military, political, and economic power to persuade nations in every region of the world to take important actions they wouldn't otherwise take.

== Quotes by the author ==
Some say the time has come for the United States to mind its own business, let other countries solve their own problems, and focus instead on rebuilding America's strength from within. Others insist that Washington can and should pursue an ambitious foreign policy, but one designed solely to make America more secure and more prosperous, not to foist our political and economic values on others. Still others say the world needs leadership and that only America can provide it.

America will remain the world's only superpower for the foreseeable future. But what sort of superpower should it be? What role should America play in the world? What role do you want America to play?

The incoherence in American foreign policy has been growing for twenty-five years. What are we going to do about it?

== Reviews ==
Newsweek called Bremmer's book, "a bombshell: and in the context of the 2016 presidential debate, a challenge to all the candidates to say something sensible about how they would change U.S. policy to suit the changed realities of the world. The Telegraph wrote, "one of the sharpest attempts to open the U.S. foreign policy debate has come from Ian Bremmer, the Eurasia Group president and foreign policy guru who coined the phrase 'G-Zero world' to describe the new era of global volatility. Bremmer maps out three distinct paths for the United States and asks America's politicians and electorate to choose between them."
