= Harmonious Society =

Chinese Communist Party philosophy

- Simplified Chinese: 和谐社会
- Traditional Chinese: 和諧社會
Transcriptions
Standard Mandarin
- Hanyu Pinyin: Héxié Shèhuì
- IPA: [xɤ̌.ɕjě ʂɤ̂.xwêɪ]

Socialist Harmonious Society
- Simplified Chinese: 社会主义和谐社会
- Traditional Chinese: 社會主義和諧社會
Transcriptions
Standard Mandarin
- Hanyu Pinyin: Shèhuìzhǔyì Héxié Shèhuì

The Harmonious Society, also known as Socialist Harmonious Society, is a socioeconomic concept in China that is recognized as a response to the increasing alleged social injustice and inequality emerging in mainland Chinese society as a result of unchecked economic growth, which has led to social conflict. The governing philosophy has therefore shifted around economic growth to overall societal balance and harmony. Along with a moderately prosperous society, it was set to be one of the national goals for the ruling Chinese Communist Party (CCP).

The concept of social harmony dates back to ancient China, to the time of Confucius. As a result, the philosophy has also been characterized as a form of New Confucianism. In modern times, it developed into a key feature of CCP general secretary Hu Jintao's signature ideology of the Scientific Outlook on Development developed in the mid-2000s, being re-introduced by the Hu–Wen Administration during the 10th National People's Congress.

The promotion of the "Harmonious Society" demonstrated that Hu Jintao's ruling philosophy had departed from that of his predecessors. Near the end of his tenure in 2011, Hu appeared to extend the ideology to an international dimension, with a focus on the international peace and cooperation, which is said to lead to a "harmonious world".

== Background ==
The concept of harmony in Chinese culture comes from music; during the Eastern Zhou dynasty, discussion of music flourished under Confucius and the schools of thought he created, known as Confucianism. Confucianism played a key part in the formulation of the earliest form of Chinese music, Qin.

Qin music illustrates the concept of harmony through its techniques such as the level of pressure and the speed of tempo, which symbolize Yin and Yang and the different temperature in the four seasons. The moderate unison of sounds maintains the perfect order and managing these opposing elements into a moderate piece of musical work is considered the best sound. Furthermore, one of the most influential works by Ru Jia (otherwise known as Book of Music), reads:

When the early rulers formed the li [rituals] and yue [music] their purpose was not to satisfy the mouth, stomach, ear and eye, but rather to teach the people to moderate their likes and hates, and bring them back to the correct direction in life.

Music, under Confucian concepts, has the power to transform people to become more civilized and the goal of music is to create balance within individuals, nature and society. Leading people "back to the correct direction in life" not only signifies the guiding role of music, but also emphasizes on the power of the rulers, "The correct 'mood' was set by the chief of state, the emperor, the son of Heaven." The power of the rulers reflects a fundamental theme in Chinese civilization. The state, or the ruling government, has the special role of taking care of the people; however, what distinguishes the Chinese ruling government from other ruling governments is the respectful attitude of the citizens, who regard the government as part of their family. In fact, the ruling government is "the head of the family, the patriarch." Therefore, the Chinese look to the government for guidance as if they are listening to their father who, according to Chinese tradition, enjoys high reverence from the rest of the family. Furthermore, "still another tradition that supports state control of music is the Chinese expectation of a verbal 'message.'" A "verbal message" is the underlying meaning behind people's words. In order to get to the "verbal message," one needs to read into words and ask oneself what the desired or expected response would be. The Chinese tradition of reading into words makes it easier for the government, or "the father," who possesses more attention and respect, to pass down its wishes through songs.

== History ==
The Socialist Harmonious Society was raised as a goal of the CCP under Hu Jintao in 2004. It was formally included at the fourth plenary session of the 16th CCP Central Committee on 19 September 2004. The decision at the resolution stated:

We must insist on the broadest and fullest mobilization of all positive factors, continuously improving our capacity to build a harmonious socialist society, continuously enhancing the creative vitality of the entire society, properly coordinating the interests of various parties, promoting innovation in the social management system, strengthening and improving mass work under the new situation, and maintaining social stability.

The concept represented a new direction of the leadership that signified the transition between Jiang Zemin and Hu Jintao. Although on the surface, "socialist harmonious society" seems benign, many scholars believed that CCP general secretary Hu has a vision for a deeper reform of the political system in China. In addition, the idea of scientific development stresses on scientific discovery and technological advance, engines for sustainable growth in the long run. Sustainable growth is a concept in macroeconomics that signifies GDP at potential (i.e. all that is produced is being consumed and there is no cyclical unemployment) for years to come.

In addition, the Socialist Harmonious Society concept was a response to the problem of social inequality and wealth gap, which if not dealt with immediately, could lead to social unrest and even turmoil. A key reason contributing to a widening wealth gap was social injustice, which features collusion between entrepreneurs and officials. Through collusion, entrepreneurs were able to buy land from farmers and then sell it at high prices. Furthermore, with the protection of local officials, private coal mine owners ignored safety regulations to cut production costs. As a result, thousands of miners are killed in accidents.

Since the 1989 Tiananmen Square protests and massacre, the leadership has been extremely sensitive about maintaining stability. General Secretary Hu's focus on stability and openness is the central model addressed in the book The J Curve: A New Way to Understand Why Nations Rise and Fall by Ian Bremmer. According to Bremmer, the Chinese government is trying carefully to avoid instability by jumping from a controlled social environment on one end to complete openness on the other. The "J Curve" model is applicable to the political development of most nations and presents a choice between stability and openness. The concept of "Socialist Harmonious Society" is said to include both elements of the model. Hence, Hu's "socialist harmonious society" has an underlying message of establishing political reform as well as safeguarding social justice and equality.

=== New interpretation ===
Hu Jintao visited the US in early 2011, two years before he stepped down as the CCP general secretary. One of the key messages of his visit was the idea of peace and cooperation: "China and the United States have major influence in international affairs and shoulder important responsibilities in upholding world peace and promoting common development." In addition to attending state dinners, President Hu visited the US-China Business Council, a Chinese-owned auto parts plant in Ohio, and Walter Payton College Preparatory High School in Chicago/Confucius Institute of Chicago. When asked about the differences between the US and China at Walter Payton Prep, Hu Jintao responded, "China and the US have different histories, culture, social systems and levels of development, but their peoples are peace-loving and in pursuit of growth. I hope that the friendship between our two nations will last forever."

With few agendas at hand before his retirement, Hu Jintao brought to America a concept of harmony that is based on peace, cooperation and "soft power" exchanges.

In addition to the utilization of soft power, the Chinese leader used the concept of "Shadow of the Future": At the high school, Hu Jintao told the students, "The young are the future of a nation and the hopes of the world. The prospects of China-US relations are in the hands of the young people of the two countries."

The United States has a tough stance on the rise of China. The appropriateness of such a tough stance is debated given the political environment at the time of American elections. During Hu's visit, President Barack Obama assured China that the US is reasserting its influence in East Asia and in the Pacific Ocean. Indeed, the US has increased its military and political presence in the Pacific through its military deployment in Australia and its diplomatic/military pressure on the territorial disputes in the South China Sea in early 2012.

== Reactions ==
While initially the public's reaction to the idea was positive, over the years "Harmonious Society" has emerged as a euphemism for "stability at all costs," and has garnered its share of critics. The government often uses "Harmonious Society" to justify the suppression of dissent and the tight control on information in China. Some social commentators have pointed out the irony that in building a "harmonious society" the country has become less just, less equal, and less fair. Meanwhile, some of Hu's critics say that application of the "Socialist Harmonious Society" concept has resulted in anything but itself. China scholar Cheng Li said that Hu's failure in implementing the Socialist Harmonious Society program has been his "gravest pitfall" during his tenure. Critics cite the increased wealth gap, higher internal security budgets, and unprecedented corruption in state-owned industries as evidence that Socialist Harmonious Society has failed in practice.

=== River crab ===
The term "River crab" (Chinese: 河蟹; pinyin: héxiè) has been adopted as internet slang in mainland China in reference to Internet censorship. The word river crab sounds similar to the word "harmonious" in Mandarin Chinese. In addition, the word harmonious can itself also be the placeholder verb for "to censor", most often referring to posts on a forum that have been deleted because of unacceptable content, or the censorship of stories reporting sensitive issues in the press. Something that has been censored in this manner is often referred to as having been "harmonized" (被和谐了).

== See also ==
- Class conflict
- Great unity, Datong
- Social issues in the People's Republic of China
- Xiaokang (Moderately prosperous society)
- River crab (internet slang)
