= The Fat Tail =

2009 book by Ian Bremmer

The Fat Tail: The Power of Political Knowledge for Strategic Investing
- Author: Ian Bremmer and Preston Keat
- Language: English
- Genre: Politics, International Affairs
- Publisher: Oxford University Press
- Publication date: March 6, 2009
- Publication place: United States
- Media type: Hardback
- Pages: 272 p. (hardback edition)
- ISBN: 0-19-532855-8
- OCLC: 221155198

The Fat Tail: The Power of Political Knowledge for Strategic Investing (Oxford University Press: 2009) is a book written by political scientists Ian Bremmer and Preston Keat. Bremmer and Keat are the president and research director respectively of Eurasia Group, a global political risk consultancy.

== Fat tails ==
The "fat tails" indicate a probability, which may be larger than otherwise anticipated, that an investment will move beyond three standard deviations. A fat tail occurs when there is an unexpectedly thick end or “tail” toward the edges of a distribution curve, indicating an irregularly high likelihood of catastrophic events. This fat tail represents the risks of an event so unlikely and difficult to predict that many choose to ignore their possibility. Political impacts are often reduced to a rounding error in conventional risk analysis; as a result, many actors affected by political risk do not adequately plan for it. This book argues that political risk can be analyzed, understood, mitigated, and often predicted.

One example Bremmer and Keat highlight in The Fat Tail is the August 1998 Russian devaluation and debt default. Leading up to this event, economic analysts predicted that Russia would not default because the country had the ability and willingness to continue making its payments. However, political analysts argued that Russia’s fragmented leadership, lack of market regulation, and several powerful Russian officials would benefit from a default reduced Russia’s willingness to pay. Since these political factors were missing from the economic models, the economists did not assign the correct probability to a Russian default.

== Chapter overview ==
Chapter 1: Introduction
Many political risk events are “fat tails.” In a probability distribution—in which most events occur in the middle—fat tails are the unexpectedly thick “tails” that occur on the ends of the distribution curve. These fat tails represent the risk that a particular event will occur that appears so unlikely and difficult to predict that so many people ignore its possibility. However, these unlikely political risk events happen more often than expected, so corporations, policymakers, and investors must understand and manage political risk. Many dismiss political risk as too complex and unpredictable to mitigate, but this book argues that it is possible to manage political risk once it is understood.

Chapter 2: Dealing with Uncertainty
Uncertainty implies an ignorance of the probability or impact (or both) of an event. The objective of risk management is to enable the determination of these factors so that what is uncertain becomes a measurable risk. Political risk is primarily measurable because politically motivated events usually require planning and deliberation. Additionally, understanding the preferences and constraints of a political system and its actors enables the forecasting of political risks. Risk maps, challenging basis assumptions through contrarian thinking, scenario analysis, and assessing country stability are valuable methods for understanding and forecasting political risk explored in this chapter.

Chapter 3: Geopolitics
Geopolitical risk affects financial markets, corporate activity, and governments. These risks are more difficult to analyze because of their long duration, analytical bias, and the complexity of feedback loops and interacting risks. The first step in analyzing geopolitical risks is identifying risks through information gathering and early warning systems. Processing and analyzing this information correctly requires using different analytical frameworks and theories. Companies can mitigate geopolitical risks by keeping an open mind, having a nimble organizational structure, planning for vastly different scenarios, and purchasing political risk insurance.

Chapter 4: Political Risk and Capital Markets
Politics and government policies can profoundly impact capital markets through currency controls, financial regulatory changes, sovereign credit defaults, and corruption, among other things. However, most investors fail to incorporate political risk into their economic models, reducing the efficacy of their models and heightening the potential for financial losses. Political risk is especially important to consider when investing in emerging markets: by definition, Eurasia Group argues these are countries where politics matters at least as much as economics in affecting market outcomes. Each emerging market is unique—based on its regime type, ideology, policies, electoral systems, etc.—and thus political risk analysis varies for each country.

Chapter 5: Domestic Instability—Revolution, Civil War, State Failure
Domestic instability can negatively affect investors and corporations, such as during the 1979 Iranian Revolution. Methods of analyzing domestic instability include aggregating indicators associated with political unrest and closely monitoring a country’s cities and/or youth population. One type of domestic instability is civil strife, which is a societal—as opposed to a governmental—risk. Civil strife includes revolutions, wars, state failures, coup d’états, and riots. Companies can mitigate the risks of civil strife through risk absorption, transfer, pooling, diversification, or avoidance.

Chapter 6: Terrorism
To mitigate the risks of political terrorism, it is helpful to map the terrorist groups and their goals, tactics, and membership. This complex undertaking requires an understanding of the environment in which terrorists operate and their organizational structure. Corporations and financial institutions can incorporate planning for terrorist attacks into their planning for events such as building damage, utility failures, and threats to their employees. Governments can attempt to prevent terrorist attacks through policing, military action, or accommodating terrorists’ demands. Given the diverse nature of terrorist groups, a varied approach to mitigating the risk of terrorism is required.

Chapter 7: Expropriation
Although the number of expropriations has declined since the 1970s, the value of the expropriations that do occur remains high. The global investment environment has become more complex as governments have become more sophisticated at restricting private property rights through regulatory changes and “creeping expropriations.” The ability and willingness of a government to expropriate is a function of international politics, economic resources, ideology, domestic politics, and—often most importantly—nationalism. Expropriation risk can be mitigated by spreading the risk among various stakeholders, engaging in joint ventures with a domestic partner, financing the investment to discourage the government from expropriation, and obtaining insurance and/or legal protection.

Chapter 8: Regulatory Risk
Governments may use their regulatory systems to discriminate against foreign investors and multinational corporations for various reasons- including fears about fading national identity and corruption. Analysis of regulatory risks must consider the government's political orientation, the strength and autonomy of local regulatory institutions, domestic politics, and the government’s relationship with domestic businesses. Risk mitigation strategies include partnering with a local business or government and obtaining financing from an influential global investor. Regulatory risk varies by sector: some face relatively more pervasive regulations, while others are inherently more flexible and better able to mitigate regulatory risks and costs.

Chapter 9: Reporting and Warning
Identifying and analyzing a risk are not sufficient for risk mitigation—a decision-maker must also understand the risk and be able to take action. Many types of biases can inhibit the successful acknowledgment of and the appropriate mitigating action of risk, including organizational/bureaucratic biases, cultural/ideological biases, and cognitive biases. Another issue in ensuring that political risks are understood is tailoring the reporting of these risks to the audience, whether it is corporate managers, financial investors, or government policymakers.

Conclusion: Mitigating Political Risks in an Uncertain World
There are four main strategies to reduce the probability of a risk event: eliminate the threat, minimize its likelihood, isolate the event, or altogether avoid the risk. None of these strategies are perfect, so planning to mitigate the impact after a risk occurs is also necessary. A holistic approach to risk management—such as Enterprise Risk Management (ERM)—breaks down categories of risks and standardizes their analysis. However, many corporations fail to incorporate political risks into their risk management frameworks, either because they do not recognize the importance of political risks or because they mistakenly think political risks are unpredictable. However, political risks are knowable—in some cases, even quantifiable—and understanding these risks is the first step in successful political risk mitigation.

== Reception ==
Strategy+Business magazine selected The Fat Tail as one of the best business books of 2009.

The Hindu calls The Fat Tail a "recommended addition to the strategists’ shelf."
