= Power vacuum =

Term used in political science

In political science and political history, the term power vacuum, also known as a power void, or power struggle, is an analogy between a physical vacuum to the political condition "when someone in a place of power, has lost control of something and no one has replaced them." The situation can occur when a government has no identifiable central power or authority, after collapse, retreat with no successor, or inability to govern due to several factors. The term is also often used in organized crime when a crime family becomes vulnerable to competition. Hereditary or statutory order of succession or effective succession planning were common ways to resolve questions of succession to positions of power.

== Historical examples ==
China experienced several power vacuums throughout its history after being first unified under emperor Qin Shi Huang in 221 BCE, ushering in more than two millennia in which China was governed by one or more imperial dynasties. From the start, China has experienced power vacuums after dynasties have been toppled, usually resulting in civil wars between different factions vying to form the next dynasty or political regime. These have included but are not limited to the Warring States period (475-221 BC), Three Kingdoms (220-280 AD), the Manchu conquest of China (1618-1683 AD), and the Chinese Civil War (1927-1949 AD).

During the course of the Ming treasure voyages (1405–1433), the Chinese Ming empire was the dominant political and military force within the Indian Ocean. However, in 1433, the Chinese government withdrew their treasure fleet and thus left a large void within the Indian Ocean.

In 2003, when the United States led a coalition to oust Saddam Hussein in the Iraq War, the absence of an all-out Iraqi opposition force at war with government forces meant that once the Ba'ath Party was removed, no local figures were on hand to immediately assume the now vacant administerial posts. For this reason, Paul Bremer was appointed by the United States government as the interim head of state to oversee the transition.

In other western-led interventions such as in Kosovo (1999) and Libya (2011) where the initial claim of justification in each case was a humanitarian matter, there had been active opposition fighting on the ground to oust the relevant governments (in the case of Kosovo, this meant removal of state forces from the desired territory rather than ousting the government itself). Subsequently, successor entities were immediately effective in Libya and Kosovo.

Power vacuums often occur in failed states sometimes referred to as Fragile states where the state has lost the power to prevent its citizens from forming states within states, such as in post-communist Moldova's Transnistria. The ongoing war in Sudan is an example of a power vacuum in the aftermath of the Sudanese revolution.

== Non-political contexts ==
The term "power vacuum" can be used a variety of contexts, to denote an absence of leadership in any organization or group that normally functions with leaders. The term is most commonly used in political contexts (nation, state, province) but can also be applied to businesses, social groups, or communities.

== See also ==
- Anarchy
- Every Nation for Itself
- Failed state
- Interregnum
- Power struggle
- Provisional government
- State collapse
