= KEAT =

KEAT may refer to:

- Pangborn Memorial Airport (ICAO code KEAT)
- KEAT-LP, a defunct low-power television station (channel 22) formerly licensed to Amarillo, Texas, United States

== See also ==
- Keat, a surname
