= Keats (surname) =

The family name Keats is a surname of England.

== People with the surname ==
Notable individuals bearing the surname include:

- Abigail Keats (born 1986), South African fashion designer
- Charles B. Keats (1905–1978), American politician and journalist
- Duke Keats (1895–1972), Canadian Hall-of-Fame ice hockey player
- Ed Keats (1915–2019), United States Navy rear admiral
- Ele Keats (born 1973), American actress
- George Keats (1797–1841), British-born American businessman and civic leader, brother of John Keats
- John Keats (1795–1821), English poet
- John Keats (writer) (1921–2000), American magazine writer, author and biographer
- Jonathon Keats (born 1971), American conceptual artist and experimental philosopher
- Jonathan Keates (born 1946), English writer, biographer and novelist
- Richard Goodwin Keats (1757–1834), British Royal Navy admiral and Commodore-Governor of Newfoundland
- Roger A. Keats (born 1948), American businessman and politician
- Tyson Keats (born 1981), New Zealand rugby union player
- Steven Keats (1945–1994), American actor
- Viola Keats (1911–1998), British actress

== See also ==
- Anglo-Saxon names
- List of Old English (Anglo-Saxon) surnames
