= Keats (disambiguation) =

John Keats (1795–1821) was an English poet.

Keats may also refer to:

== Places ==
- Keats Island (British Columbia), Canada
- Keats Island (Newfoundland and Labrador), Canada
- Keats, Kansas, an unincorporated community in the United States
- Keats (crater), a crater on Mercury

== Other uses ==
- Keats (surname)
- HMS Keats, a British frigate in service in the Royal Navy from 1943 to 1946
- Keats (band), a British rock band

== People with the given name ==
- Keats Lester (1904–1946), British tennis player

== See also ==
- Keat, a surname
- Keats' House, home of poet John Keats
