= The End of the Free Market =

2010 non-fiction book by Ian Bremmer

The End of the Free Market: Who Wins the War Between States and Corporations?
- Author: Ian Bremmer
- Language: English
- Genre: Politics, International Affairs
- Publisher: Portfolio
- Publication date: May 13, 2010
- Publication place: United States
- Media type: Hardback
- Pages: 240 p. (hardback edition)
- ISBN: 978-1-59184-301-6

The End of the Free Market: Who Wins the War Between States and Corporations? is a 2010 American non-fiction book by Ian Bremmer, that discusses the rise of state capitalism, a system in which governments dominate local economies through ownership of market-dominant companies and large pools of excess capital, using them for political gain. This trend, Bremmer argues, challenges America's economic strength and the conduct of free markets everywhere.

== Reviews ==
- American Antitrust Institute
- Asia Times
- Bloomberg.com
- Business World
- The Daily Telegraph
- The Economist
- European Affairs
- Foreign Affairs
- The Indian Express
- The National
- The New Statesman
- The New York Times
- Publishers Weekly
- RealClearPolitics
- Reuters
- The Wall Street Journal
- The Washington Post
- The Washington Times

== Awards ==
- Financial Times: Summer's Best Books; Year's Best Books
- Financial Times and Goldman Sachs Business Book of the Year Award, Long-List:
- Foreign Affairs: Must Read Book of 2010, Fareed Zakaria
- The Hindu: Print Pick
- The Week: Dambisa Moyo's 6 Favorite Books
