= ArmorGroup =

British private security company

ArmorGroup International plc
- Type: Private military security firm
- Industry: Government contracting
- Founded: 1981
- Headquarters: London, United Kingdom
- Revenue: US$ 295 million
- Operating income: US$ 9.2 million
- Net income: US$ 7.1 million
- Number of employees: 8,500

ArmorGroup International was a British company which provided private security services. It was founded in 1981 and was listed on the London Stock Exchange until 6 June 2008 (it was acquired by G4S plc in April 2008).

ArmorGroup provides protective security services, risk management consultancy, security training and mine action services. It has 38 offices in 27 countries, including Afghanistan, Bahrain, Colombia, Iraq, Lebanon, Nigeria and Sudan.

It is a founder and full member of the International Peace Operations Association (IPOA), the British Association of Private Security Companies (BAPSC) and the Private Security Company Association of Iraq (PSCAI).

== History ==
ArmorGroup began operations in 1981 as Defence Systems Limited (DSL), a company founded "to provide protective security services principally to multinational oil and gas companies." The publicly traded Armor Holdings, Inc., a business principally involved in the manufacture of armored vehicles and law enforcement equipment, acquired DSL in 1997. Some of the current senior management team carried out a Management Buyout of the company in November 2003, backed by Granville Baird Capital Partners and Barclays Bank. ArmorGroup was listed on the main list of the London Stock Exchange in December 2004.

ArmorGroup first entered Iraq under contract with the Bechtel Corporation in May 2003. ArmorGroup is now one of the very few private security companies which is legally registered and licensed to operate by the Iraqi Ministry of Interior and Ministry of Trade. In 2007, the firm had 1,200 employees in Iraq. ArmorGroup provides security for roughly one third of all nonmilitary supply convoys in Iraq. In 2007, the Washington Post cited U.S. Labor Department information that ArmorGroup had sustained 26 fatalities in Iraq.

In 2007, it posted a US$9.2 million profit, reporting $295 million turnover for that year. On March 20, 2008, the company announced that its board had recommended a £43.6 million cash offer for the company by G4S plc. The acquisition completed on 29 April 2008. G4S has basically retired the "ArmorGroup" name, although ArmorGroup North America, Inc. ("AGNA") is still in existence (see below).

In August 2009, ArmorGroup employee Danny Fitzsimons killed two colleagues in Iraq, Paul McGuigan and Darren Hoare, and attempted to kill an Iraqi security guard; Fitzsimons, McGuigan and Hoare had been stationed in the Green Zone at the time. Under the U.S.–Iraq Status of Forces Agreement, which ended diplomatic immunity for foreigners in Iraq, Fitzsimons was tried by the Iraqi judicial system and sentenced to 20 years in prison on 28 February 2011. Fitzsimons claimed he was acting in self-defence after a fight broke out with McGuigan and Hoare, and unsuccessfully requested a plea agreement on manslaughter charges instead.

== Controversies ==
=== ArmorGroup North America scandal ===
On June 11, 2009, The Wall Street Journal reported that internal State Department documents deemed ArmorGroup security lapses at the US embassy in Kabul so severe as to render the compound in "jeopardy." Guard posts were found empty and unstaffed for hours at a time, among other problems. The article quoted staffers on the Senate Homeland Security and Governmental Affairs Committee's contracting oversight panel.

On 1 September 2009, the Project On Government Oversight sent a letter to Secretary of State Hillary Clinton which detailed allegations of misconduct by over 10% of the 450 employees of ArmorGroup guarding the embassy. There were claims also that the guards drank excessively and misbehaved whilst under the influence, did not speak English or Pashto (as they were largely Gurkhas) and had not been properly equipped to carry out their work. On 4 September 2009, the US State department announced that eight private security guards and some of their managers would be fired.

Several days later on September 10, the Project on Government Oversight offered further details on the company's problems with upholding its obligations at the embassy as outlined in a $189 million contract. A federal complaint was filed over the company's "serious and chronic under-staffing," the "language and communications violations committed by personnel," the "numerous instances of making false statements, misrepresentations and withholding information from the State," and "jeopardizing the safety of the guard force via the purchase of cheaper, sub-par armored vehicles." The report also said that ArmorGroup demonstrated "a pattern of blatant and longstanding violations" leading to a "pervasive breakdown" in discipline, morale and security at the embassy.

On Sept. 14th, witnesses and panelists at a Commission on Wartime Contracting hearing urged the U.S. State Department to cancel its Afghanistan contract with ArmorGroup for massive failures, deficiencies and "egregious violations."

On 27 October 2010, the Department of State's Office of Inspector General released a report finding that AGNA had not been able to recruit, train, or manage the Kabul Embassy Security Force ("KESF") at the staffing level or the quality required by its contract with the Department of State. They also found that AGNA had employed Nepalese guards without verifiable experience, training, or background investigations in violation of its contract.

In July 2011, the US Department of Justice announced that ArmorGroup paid the US government $7.5 million to resolve issues stemming from false claims the company made regarding charges for its services at the embassy. The payment also covered claims that its employees violated the Trafficking Victims Protection Act (TVPA), and that management was aware of this, as well as allegations that ArmorGroup misrepresented the prior work experience of 38 national guards it hired. Additional allegations stated that the company had failed to comply with Foreign Ownership, Control and Influence mitigation requirements on the contract, as well as those outlined in a separate contract to provide guard services at a US naval support facility in Bahrain.

As of 15 June 2012, AGNA has turned over security responsibilities for the embassy to Aegis Defense Services LLC, an American branch of Aegis Ltd.

=== Afghanistan scandals ===
On Oct. 7, 2010, the Senate Armed Services Committee released a report detailing how ArmorGroup turned to local, Afghan warlords to provide most of the guard force at a US airbase in the Herat Province in Western Afghanistan. The report included statements from many, including an army sergeant, who said that one of the warlords used by the company "would provide money because of his contracting jobs with ArmorGroup. He had a lot of money from that, and he would give that money to Taliban commanders, and they in turn would buy weapons and ammo, whatever they needed."

According to Gordon's lawsuit on November 8, 2007, ArmorGroup North America deputy program manager Jimmy Lemon informed James Gordon, a former ArmorGroup director of operations, and Puja Power, the acting director of human resources, that AGNA's armorer (the official in charge of the upkeep of small arms, machine guns and ammunition) was not properly performing his duties and had recently been forcibly removed during work hours from a brothel in Kabul. Gordon instructed Power to initiate action to terminate him at once. Gordon knew that the procurement of commercial sex acts by AGNA employees violated the laws of the United States and the Kabul Embassy contract. He was concerned both because the frequenting of brothels by AGNA personnel raised security concerns about the guard force's ability to safeguard the US Embassy and because it was well known that young Chinese girls were trafficked to Kabul for commercial sexual exploitation, in violation of the Trafficking Victims Protection Act. The act and its implementing regulations prohibit contractors, like ArmorGroup and their employees, from engaging in severe forms of trafficking in persons and from procuring commercial sex acts during the period of performance of the contract. According to the US State Department's 2008 Trafficking in Persons Report, Afghanistan is a destination for women and girls from China, Iran and Tajikistan trafficked for commercial sexual exploitation. Afghan children are also trafficked within the country for sexual exploitation.

== Services ==
- Protective security services – Convoy escorting, Close Protection, guarding, maritime security and technical security systems;
- Security training – hostile environment awareness training, specialist driving and surveillance detection;
- Security consultancy – Kidnap, ransom and extortion support; risk management and business continuity planning; and
- Weapons reduction and mine clearance – mine and UXO survey, detection, removal and destruction; small arms, light weapons and ammunition stockpile reduction; Mine risk education.

== Similar companies ==
- Control Risks
- Oxford Analytica
- Roubini Global Economics
- Economist Intelligence Unit
- Eurasia Group
- Le Beck International
