= Raymond Taras =

- Born: November 6, 1946 (age 79); Montreal, Quebec, Canada
- Known for: Research in Xenophobia and Islamophobia in Europe
- Board member of: Fulbright Distinguished Chair at Australian National University in Canberra

Academic background
- Education: University of Warsaw

Academic work
- Discipline: Sociologist, political scientist
- Sub-discipline: multiculturalism, xenophobia, Islamophobia, ethnic conflicts
- Institutions: Tulane University, Harvard University, Stanford University, Michigan University, the European University Institute, Malmö University, Warsaw University, and University of Sussex
- Main interests: Central and Eastern Europe
- Website: https://sites.google.com/site/raytaras/

Raymond Taras (also Ray Taras) is a Canadian political scientist. His interests include issues of Central and Eastern Europe and Russia, multiculturalism, xenophobia, Islamophobia, ethnic conflicts, and response to refugee crisis and immigration in the receiving countries. During the 2014–15 academic year Ray Taras was a Leverhulme Visiting Professor at the Centre for Migration Research, University of Sussex. In 2018-19 he was Fulbright Distinguished Chair at the Australian National University in Canberra.

B.A. Université de Montréal, M.A. Sussex university, M.Phil. University of Essex, Ph.D. in political sociology, Warsaw University (1981).

Languages spoken: Polish (first language), Canadian French (language of education), intermediate level in Russian and Spanish, as well as basics in Swedish and Danish.

Raymond Taras was born in a Polish family in Montreal, Canada.

== Published works ==
Ray Taras is an author and editor of over 20 monographs and over 100 articles

- Ray Taras, ed, Exploring Russia's exceptionalism in international politics, Abingdon: Routledge, (US distributor: Routledge), 2024
- Ray Taras, Thucydides' meditations on fear: Examining contemporary cases, London: Anthem Press, 2023
- Ray Taras, Nationhood, Migration and Global Politics, Edinburgh University Press, October 2018
- Ray Taras, Fear and the Making of Foreign Policy: Europe and Beyond, Edinburgh: Edinburgh University Press (US distributor: OUP USA), March 2015
- Ray Taras, ed, Challenging multiculturalism: European Models of Diversity, Edinburgh: Edinburgh University Press (US distributor: OUP USA), December 2012
- Ray Taras, Xenophobia and Islamophobia in Europe, Edinburgh: Edinburgh University Press (US distributor: OUP USA), 2012
- Ray Taras, ed, Russia's identity in international relations: images, perceptions, misperceptions, London: Routledge, 2012
- Ray Taras and Rajat Ganguly, Understanding ethnic conflict: the international dimension, 4th edn. New York: Longman, 2010, xviii + 318 pp. (1st edn: 1998; 2nd edn: 2002; 3rd edn: 2006; 3rd edn update: 2008)
- Ray Taras, Europe old and new: transnationalism, belonging, xenophobia, Boulder, CO: Rowman and Littlefield, 2008, x + 247 pp.
- Ray Taras, Liberal and illiberal nationalisms, Basingstoke, England: Palgrave, 2002, xvi + 251 pp.
- Marjorie Castle and Ray Taras, Democracy in Poland, Boulder, CO: Westview Press, 2002, xx + 291 pp.
- Ray Taras (ed.), National identities and ethnic minorities in Eastern Europe, New York: St. Martin's Press/London: Macmillan, 1998, xii + 228 pp.
- Ray Taras (ed.), Postcommunist presidents, Cambridge: Cambridge University Press, 1997, ix + 245 pp.
- Ian Bremmer, Ray Taras (eds.), New states, new politics: building the post-Soviet nations, Cambridge: Cambridge University Press, 1997 (re-issued 2011), xxi + 743 pp 43 tables, 26 maps
- Ray Taras, Consolidating democracy in Poland, Boulder, CO: Westview Press, 1995, xii + 276 pp.
- Ian Bremmer, Ray Taras (eds.), Nations and politics in the Soviet successor states, Cambridge: Cambridge University Press, 1993 (reprinted 1994, 1995), xxvii + 577 pp., 37 tables, 12 maps
- Ray Taras (ed.), Handbook of political science research on the USSR and Eastern Europe: trends from the 1950s to the 1990s, New York: Greenwood Press, 1992, vi + 345 pp.
- Ray Taras (ed.), The road to disillusion: from critical Marxism to post-communism, Armonk, NY: M.E. Sharpe, 1992, x + 206 pp.
- Roland Ebel, Ray Taras, and James Cochrane, Political culture and foreign policy in Latin America: case studies from the circum-Caribbean, Albany, NY: State University of New York Press, 1991, viii + 267 pp.
- Ray Taras (ed.), Leadership change in communist states, Boston: Unwin Hyman, 1989, xv + 210 pp.
- Donat Taddeo and Ray Taras, Le débat linguistique au Québec, Montréal: Presses de l'Université de Montréal, 1987, xii + 246 pp.
- Ray Taras, Poland: socialist state, rebellious nation, Boulder, CO: Westview Press, 1986, xviii + 200 pp.
- Ray Taras, Ideology in a socialist state: Poland 1956-83, Cambridge: Cambridge University Press, 1984 (re-issued 2008), x + 299 pp.
