= Larissa Keat =

Swiss-American actress, director, and performer (born 1989)

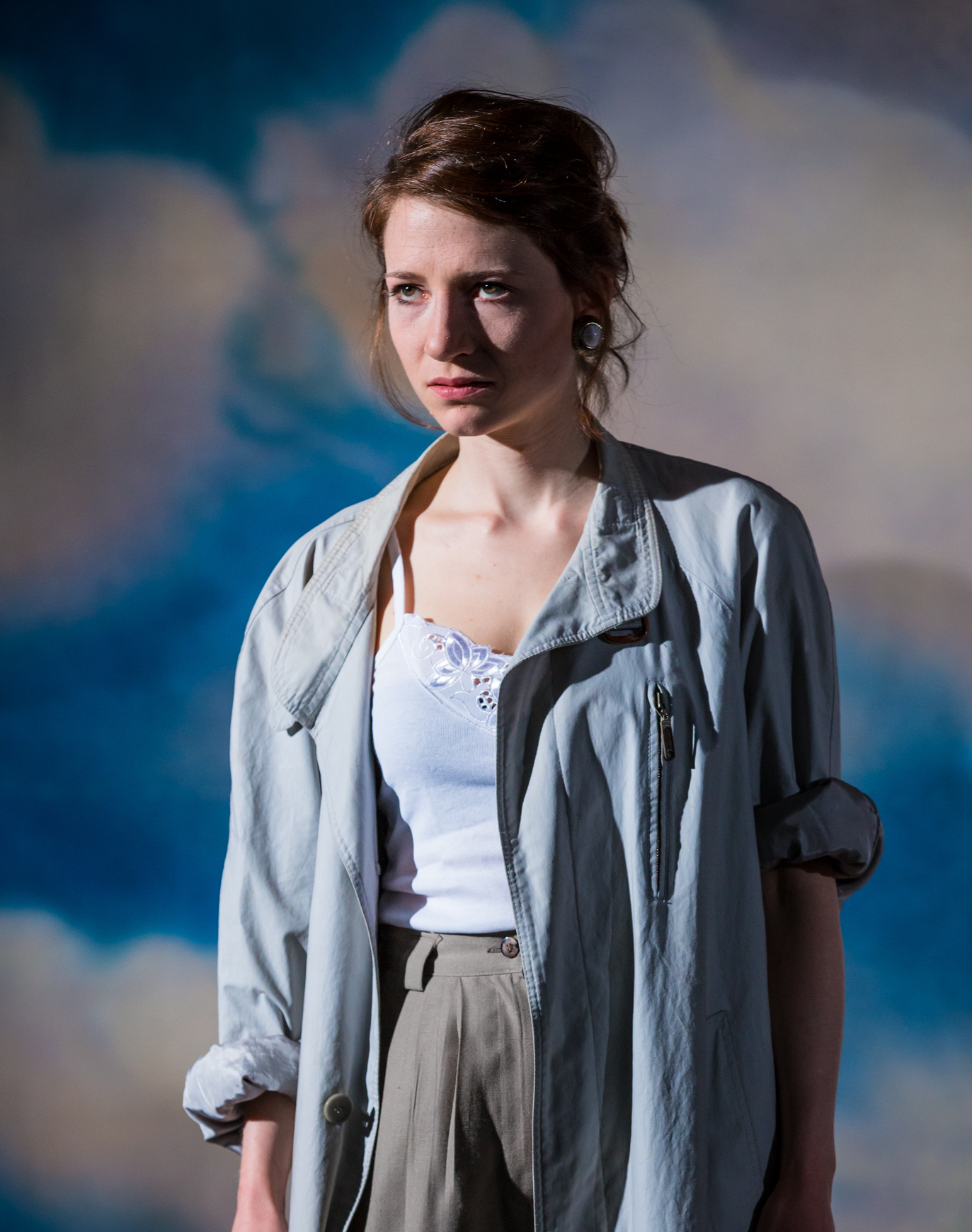
- Born: 1989 (age 36–37); Lenzburg, Switzerland
- Occupation: Actor
- Years active: 2011–present

Larissa Keat (born 1989) is a Swiss-American actor, director and performer.

== Biography ==
Larissa Keat was born in Lenzburg as the elder of two daughters with an American father and a Swiss mother. She grew up mainly in Siglistorf, a small village near the German border. Since 2013, she has lived in Hamburg, where she had moved for her acting education.

After graduating from secondary school in 2009 at Kantonsschule Baden, she did the Arts Preparation Course at the art school in Zurich (Zürcher Hochschule der Künste), where she started her studies in Scenography. After one year, she left to study acting at Schauspiel-Studio Frese in Hamburg from 2013 to 2016.

She had her first acting experience at „Atelier Kunterbunt" at eleven. Then, she was a member of the theatre group Junges Theater Baden member for eight years. After graduating from drama school, she has been working as a freelance actress and performer, for example, at Deutsches Schauspielhaus Hamburg (director: Schorsch Kamerun) or Kampnagel Hamburg (choreography: Patricia Carolin Mai). She has also frequently worked at theatres in Switzerland, such as Junges Schauspielhaus Zürich or DAS Theater an der Effingerstrasse in Bern.

Another part of her artistic work is her engagement in the off-scene. She has written and staged several plays (#DieKapsel, NowHere Land). With the performance Rally against Radicalisation in Marrakech and Marseille, it was the first time she worked outside the German-speaking part of Europe.

== Theatre ==
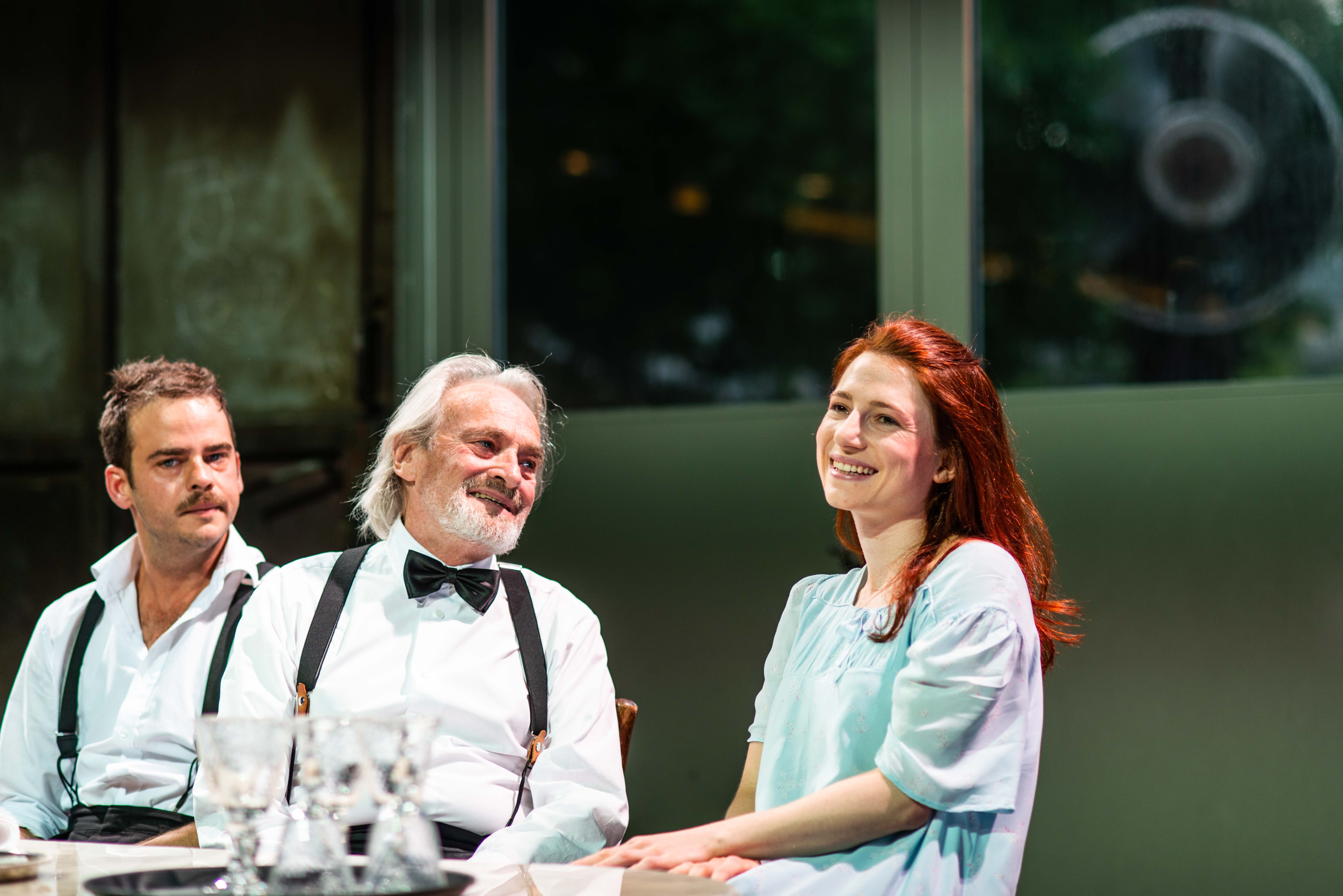
Larissa Keat 2018 in Nachspielzeit by Jan Sobrie at Junges Schauspielhaus Zürich

- 2011: Candide (2011) by Voltaire at Theater Neumarkt, director: Florian Huber
- 2012: Romulus der Grosse (2012) by Friedrich Dürrenmatt, Junges Theater Baden, director: David Imhoof
- 2015: Bier für Frauen (2015) by Felicia Zeller, director: Saskia Kaufmann
- 2016: Kristina und Descartes (2016) by Josh Goldberg, Salontheater Eppendorf
- 2017: Katastrophenstimmung (2017) by Schorsch Kamerun at Deutsches Schauspielhaus Hamburg, director: Schorsch Kamerun
- 2018: Darwins Slipslop (2018) by Josh Goldberg, Salontheater Eppendorf
- 2018–2019: Nachspielzeit (2018–2019) by Jan Sobrie, Junges Schauspielhaus Zürich, director: Jan Sobrie
- 2019: Ein Bild von Lydia (2019) by Lukas Hartmann, DAS Theater an der Effingerstrasse, Bern, director: Markus Keller
- 2019: One Flew Over the Cuckoo's Nest (2019) by Ken Kesey, DAS Theater an der Effingerstrasse, Bern, director: Alexander Kratzer
- 2020: Smith & Wesson - Rachels grosses Wagnis (2020) by Alessandro Baricco, DAS Theater an der Effingerstrasse, Bern, director: Markus Keller
- 2020: Der Übergang, off scene collective Lui&Lei, Schleswig-Holstein, director: Johanna Sara Schmidt/Hatto ter Hazeborg

== Filmography ==
- 2012: Wenn es einfach schwierig wird (2012), image film, director: Jürg Ebe
- 2016: Mona (2016), bachelor film, director: Sonja Presich
- 2018: Die andere Seite (2018), episode: Das Haus der Seelen, TV series, TLC, director: Florian Anders
- 2018: Zahltag (2018), SAE graduation film, director: Alexander Lobinski
- 2019: Amaia, 29 (2019), independent short film, director: Madhu Chard
- 2020: Mosaik Teaser (2020), Tapir Filmatelier

== More artistic work ==
=== Director ===
- 2016: #DieKapsel, theatre performance (2016), Hamburger Sprechwerk/ Monsun Theater Hamburg

=== Performer ===
- 2015: Nearly There, dance theatre by the group Bassedanse, Mojo Club Hamburg
- 2016: Catan Allay, dance piece, Kampnagel, choreography: Patricia Carolin Mai
- 2017: PartitanZ, performance at Lunatic Festival Lüneburg, concept: Marit Persiel
- 2018: Rally Against Radicalisation, performance in public space, Marrakech/Hamburg/Marseille, choreography: Dace Jonele
- 2019–2020: Dann gibt es nur eins!, by Wolfgang Borchert, open air performance as part of the Hiroschima Memorial Day and Bonhoeffer Days

=== Speaker ===
- 2012: Ohrenweide, audio walk, Theaterspektakel Zürich
- 2017: live audio drama, Krimi Komplizen, Nachtasyl Hamburg
- 2018: excerpts from: Du und ich und alle anderen Kinder by Bart Moeyaert, Lauschzeit, Junges Schauspielhaus Zürich

=== Synchronisation ===
- 2020: Alizée, in the Swiss series "HELVETICA", SRF

=== Own Projects ===
- 2012: Engel (2012), children's play, text/acting
- 2016: #DieKapsel (2016), theatre performance, Hamburger Sprechwerk/Monsun Theater Hamburg, concept and co-writing/production/direction
- 2016: S´Goldige Nüteli (2016), children's play, text/acting
- 2018: NowHere Land! – Oder wo der Bartli den Most holt (2018), theatre research, Monsun Theater Hamburg, idea/text/production/acting/co-direction
