= Every Nation for Itself =

2012 book by Ian Bremmer

Every Nation for Itself: Winners and Losers in a G-Zero World
- Author: Ian Bremmer
- Language: English
- Genre: Politics, International Affairs
- Publisher: Portfolio
- Publication date: May 1, 2012
- Publication place: United States
- Media type: Hardback
- Pages: 240 p. (hardback edition)
- ISBN: 1-5918-4468-1
- Website: Book website

Every Nation for Itself: Winners and Losers in a G-Zero World is a 2012 non-fiction book by Ian Bremmer that explains the growing "G-Zero" power vacuum in international politics as no country or group of countries has the political and economic leverage to drive an international agenda or provide global public goods. The book gives a historical summary of the global political order and American role in world affairs from the post-World War II establishment of the Bretton Woods system up through the present day. It outlines the various tolls that the G-Zero will exact, potential winners and losers in such an environment, and makes predictions as to what kind of political order will succeed the G-Zero.

== Overview ==
"G-Zero" is Bremmer's reference to a perceived shift away from the preeminence of the Group of Seven industrialized countries and the expanded Group of Twenty, which includes major emerging powers like China, India, Brazil, Turkey and others. He also rejects terms like G2, often used to identify a possible strategic partnership between the U.S. and Chinese governments, and G3, which represents an attempt to align U.S., European and Japanese interests to defend free market democracy from the rise of state capitalism in China. Those who argue that the G-Zero has become the current international order assert that the G7 has become obsolete, that the G20 offers too many competing visions of the proper role of government in an economy to produce well-coordinated policies, that China has no interest in the responsibilities that come with a G2, and that America, Europe and Japan are too mired in internal problems to forge a common approach to economic and security policy.

In an article called "From G8 to G20 to G-Zero: Why no one wants to take charge in the new global order," Bremmer writes that making compromises are difficult since each country has their own values and developed countries have voters that want their leader's focus to be domestic community, not the international one. Some of these developed countries include the United States, Britain, Germany, France, and Japan. As developed countries start to focus on their domestic issues, the lack of global leadership increases which in turn increases the transnational problems. As global leadership decreases, clashes between countries are also increasing such as America and China having different views on "statedriven and free-market varieties of capitalism". There are also issues arising in East Asia between nations such as China and Japan in the East China Sea. The U.S. has to also focus on changes in their energy sector and whether they should participate in Syria's civil war.

Bremmer says that governments can adapt to the G-Zero through focusing on regional solutions such as China's deals with ASEAN and the United States' progress on the Trans-Pacific Partnership. Governments can also form relationships with a diversity of partners. However some countries may still not be able to adapt to the G-Zero because of three impacting events in the world: "China's rise, Middle East turmoil and the redesign of Europe". Countries affected by these events would be Japan, Israel and Britain.

The concept of the G-Zero has been criticized by some who argue that it overstates the decline in America's political and economic power and underestimates the willingness of developing countries to play a larger role on the international stage.

== Reviews ==
- The Bookbag
- Carnegie Council
- The Financial Times
- Global Brief
- Harrisburg Magazine
- The Huffington Post
- New Statesman
- New Straits Times
- The New Yorker
- RealClearPolitics
- USA Today
- World Politics Review

== Awards ==
- The Financial Times "Pick of the crop" list (Best Books of 2012)
- Foreign Policy Association "Book of the Year"
