= The J Curve =

2006 book by Ian Bremmer

The J Curve: A New Way to Understand Why Nations Rise and Fall
- Author: Ian Bremmer
- Language: English
- Genre: Politics, International Affairs
- Publisher: Simon & Schuster
- Publication date: September 12, 2006
- Publication place: United States
- Media type: Hardback
- Pages: 320 p. (hardback edition)
- ISBN: 0-7432-7471-7
- OCLC: 65341173
- Dewey Decimal: 320.3 22
- LC Class: JC489 .B74 2006

The J Curve: A New Way to Understand Why Nations Rise and Fall (Simon & Schuster: 2006) is a book by political scientist Ian Bremmer. It was named a "Book of the Year" in 2006 by The Economist.

Bremmer's J Curve describes the relationship between a country's openness and its stability; focusing on the notion that while many countries are stable because they are open (the United States, France, Japan), others are stable because they are closed (North Korea, Cuba, Iraq under Saddam Hussein). According to Bremmer, a government's motivations differ dramatically depending on where they fall on the J curve.

== J Curve model ==

The x-axis of the political J-Curve graph measures the "openness" (of freedom) of the State in question, and the y-axis measures the stability of that same state. It suggests that those states that are 'closed'/undemocratic/unfree (such as the Communist dictatorships of China and Cuba) are very stable; however, as one progresses right, along the x-axis, it is evident that stability (for relatively short period of time in the lengthy life of nations) decreases, creating a dip in the graph, until beginning to pick up again as the 'openness' of a state increases; at the other end of the graph to closed states are the open states of the West, such as the United States or the United Kingdom. Thus, a J-shaped curve is formed.

States can travel both forward (right) and backwards (left) along this J-curve, and so stability and openness are never secure. The J is steeper on the left hand side, as it is easier for a leader in an authoritarian state to create stability by closing the country than to build a civil society and establish accountable institutions; the curve is higher on the far right than left because states that prevail in opening their societies (Eastern Europe, for example) ultimately become more stable than authoritarian regimes.

Bremmer's entire curve can shift up or down depending on economic resources available to the government in question. Therefore, Saudi Arabia's relative stability at every point along the curve rises or falls depending on the price of oil; China's curve, meanwhile, analogously depends on the country's economic growth.

== Quotes by the author ==
The developed world should neither shelter nor militarily destabilize authoritarian regimes—unless those regimes represent an imminent threat to the national security of other states. Developed states should instead work to create the conditions most favorable for a closed regime’s safe passage through the least stable segment of the J curve — however and whenever the slide toward instability comes. And developed states should minimize the risk these states pose the rest of the world as their transition toward modernity begins.

== Applications ==
- David Agpar proposes The J Curve for an Iraq solution
- Richard Beck on The J Curve and the Missional Church
- The J Curve and Malaysia
- The J Curve and Zimbabwe
