= Le Beck International =

Middle East-based security and risk management consultancy

- Company type: Corporation
- Industry: Consulting; Professional Services
- Founded: 2001
- Headquarters: Bahrain
- Number of locations: 3 offices (Bahrain, Riyadh, Jeddah)
- Products: Professional services, Mobile application

Le Beck International is a Middle East-based security and risk management consultancy.

== History ==
Current CEO, Anthony Tesar, founded the company in August 2001. It was originally headquartered in Riyadh, Saudi Arabia, but is now based out of the Kingdom of Bahrain. As of January 2017, the company employs over 20 individuals across several continents.

== Services ==
The company provides security, threat, and vulnerability mitigation services for companies in a wide range of sectors. Le Beck operates through a commercially registered entity in Saudi Arabia under approval from the country's High Commission of Industrial Security (HCIS), a body which oversees critical sectors in the kingdom.

== Clients ==
Le Beck International serves the financial, oil & gas, petrochemical, electricity, and transportation industries. The company also consults on mega city projects and for high-net-worth individuals (HNWI). In Bahrain alone, Le Beck provides consulting services to several banks and oil & gas firms.

== Leadership ==
- CEO: Anthony Tesar - former bomb disposal officer and UN weapons inspector

== See also ==
- Control Risks
- ArmorGroup
- Eurasia Group
- Kroll
- Pinkerton
