= Abigail Keats =

South African fashion designer (born 1986)

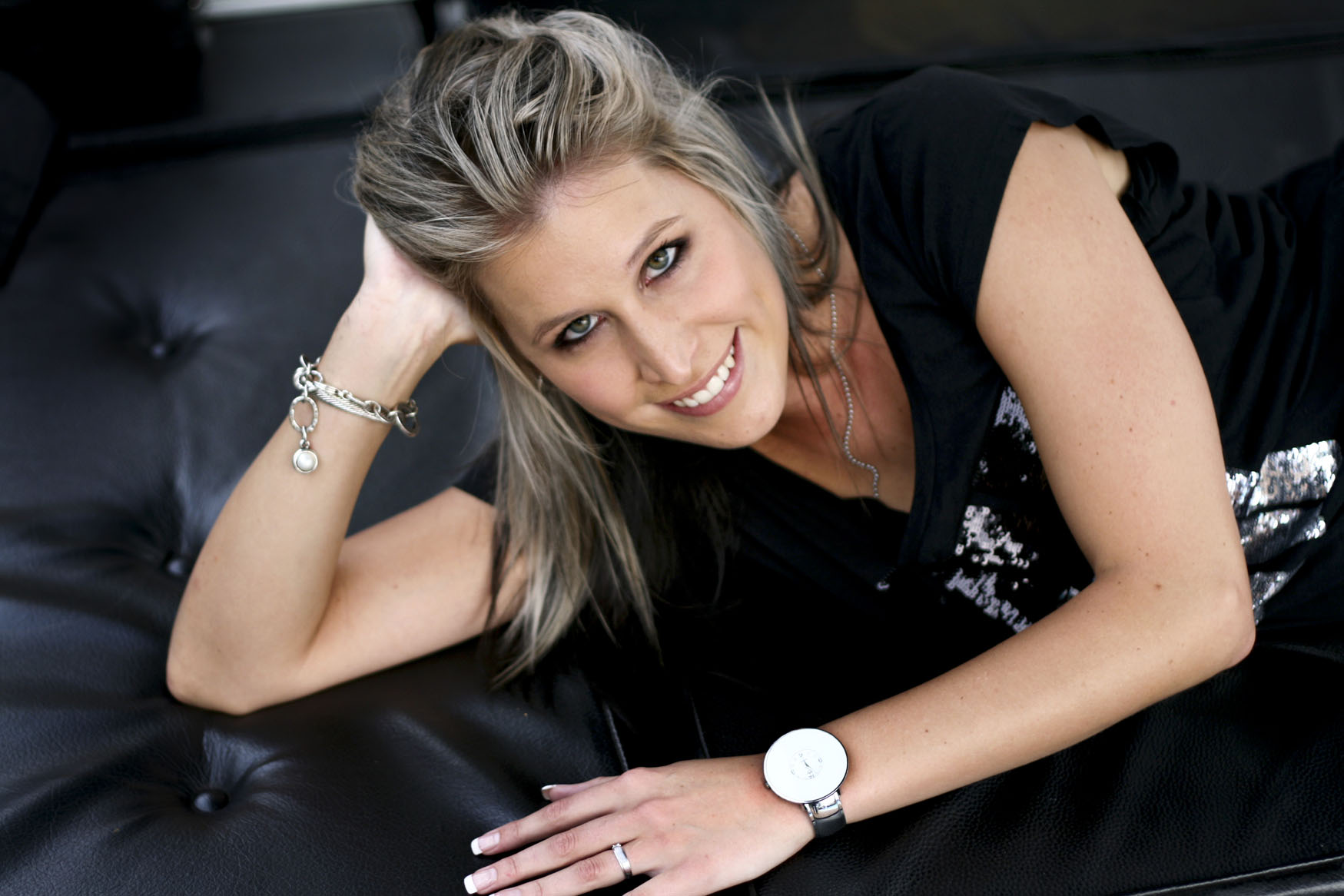
- Keats in 2009
- Born: 11 November 1986 (age 38); Durban, Kwa-Zulu Natal, South Africa
- Education: SA London International School of fashion
- Known for: Sophisticated contemporary
- Label: Abigail Keats
- Website: abigailkeats.com

Abigail Keats (born 11 November 1986) is a South African fashion designer.

== Background ==
Abigail Keats attended Dainfern College in her teen years. Later she graduated top of her year from the SA London International School of fashion in 2007 and launched her first collection at Audi Fashion Week 2008 as part of the autumn/winter New Generation Designer show.

Since then she has also showed her collections at Joburg Fashion Week, Audi Fashion Week and Arise Africa Fashion week - AFI

Keats has also been invited to showcase in New York City, London and Miami, and has been selected as the "designer of the month" in South African Elle magazine (Elle Magazine, June 2008, Vol 13 No 3, Page 38) and the 'designer to watch' in Cosmopolitan magazine and 'featured designer' in life style magazine Ray.

== Signature style ==
Keats signature style is best described as a sophisticated contemporary art form that plays with the paradox of masculine tailoring, while exaggerating a feminine figure. The focus throughout all her collections is embedded in exerting the power of a woman while magnifying the beauty and grace of her being and form. Her love for art, self-expression and creation is the inspiration on which all her collections are fashioned.

== Snippets ==
April 2009, Miss FTV Grand Finale, finalists took to the stage and stunned audiences with elegant and fashionable designs created by well-known designers such as David Tlale, Abigail Keats, Earth Child and Heni.

June 2010, Keats was named by the Mail & Guardian newspaper as one of the top 200 Influential Young South Africans.

June 2010, Keats is selected by the South African Government to represent South Africa at the World Expo 2010 in Shanghai, China - A Grand Gathering of the World Cultures.

== Gallery ==
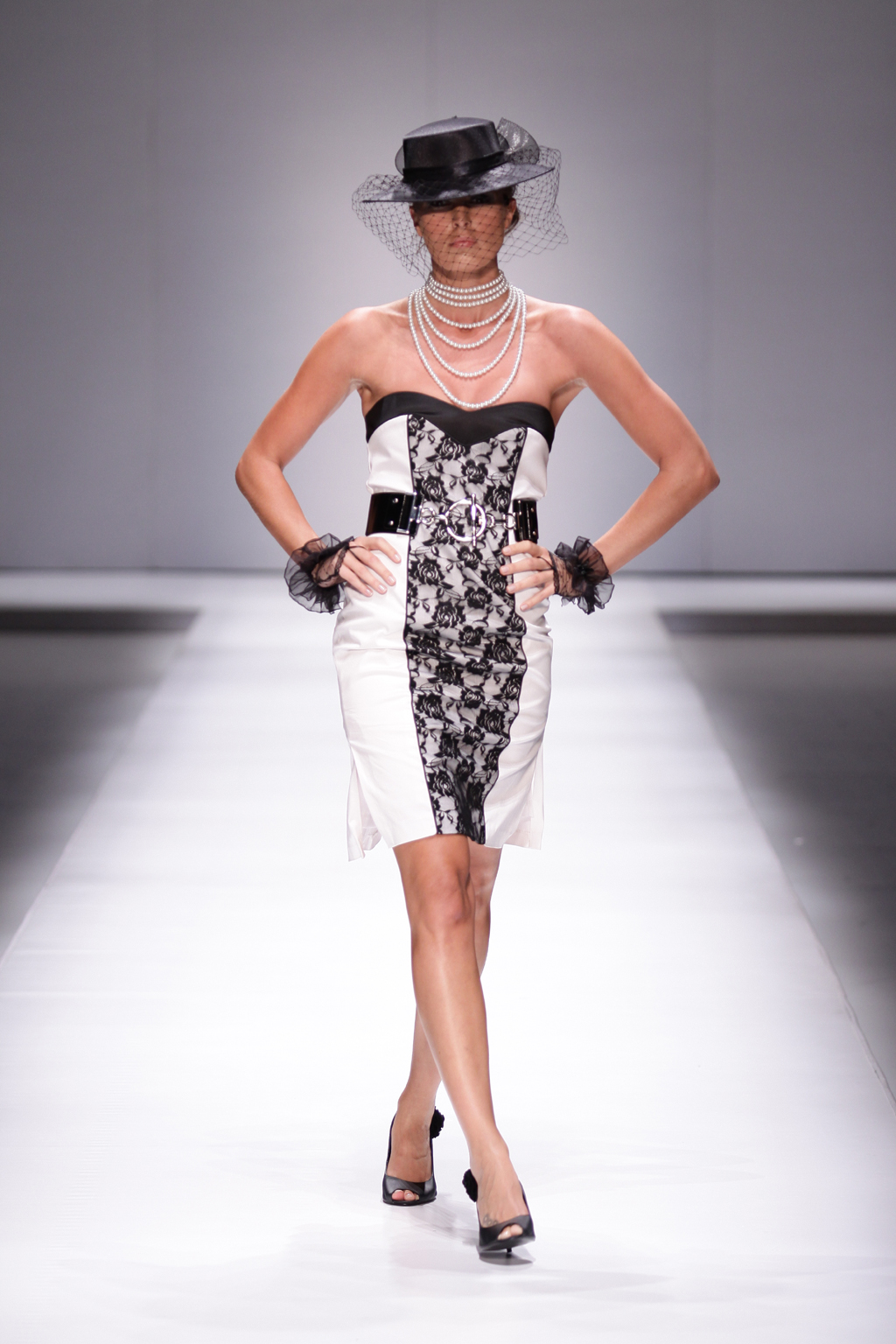

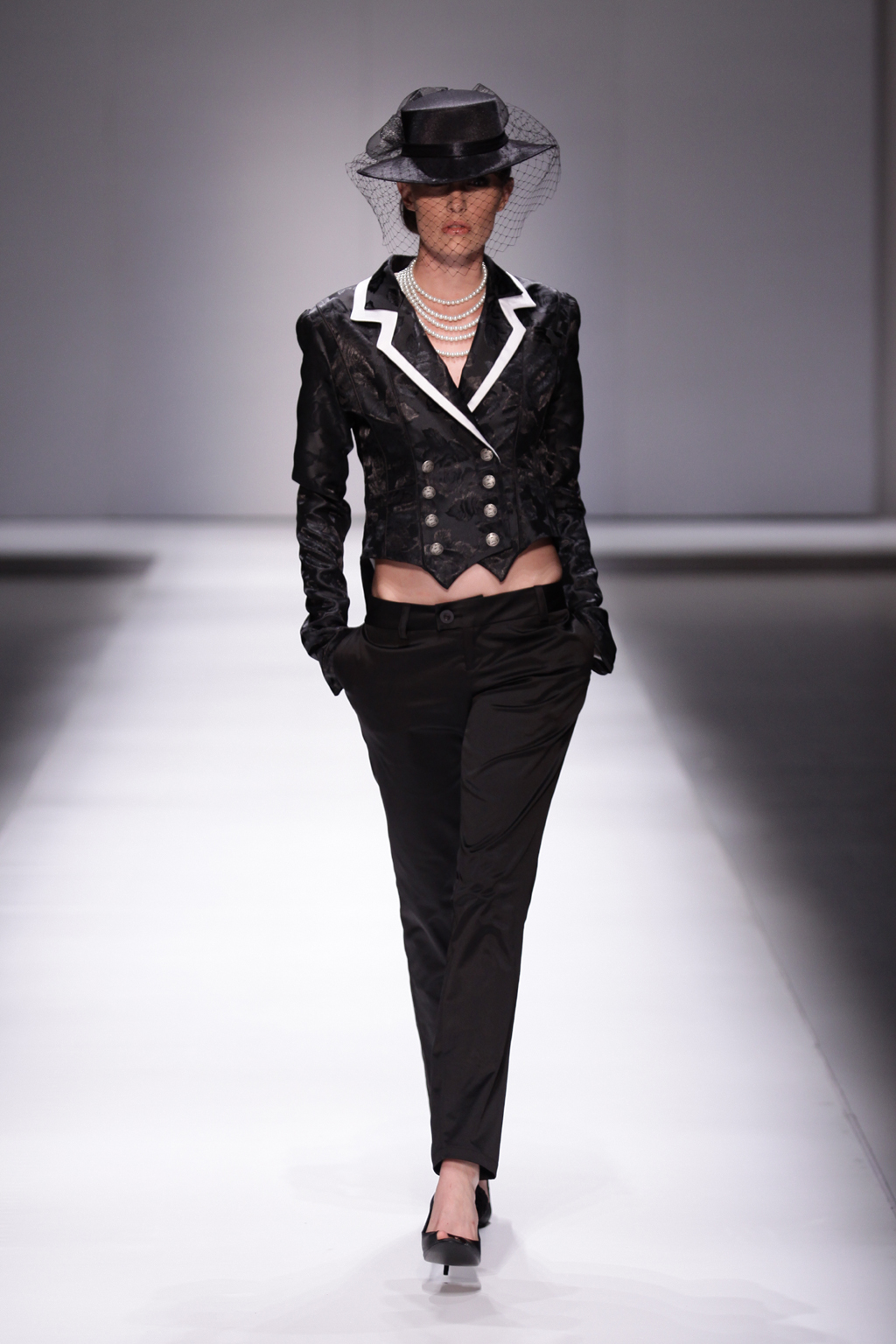

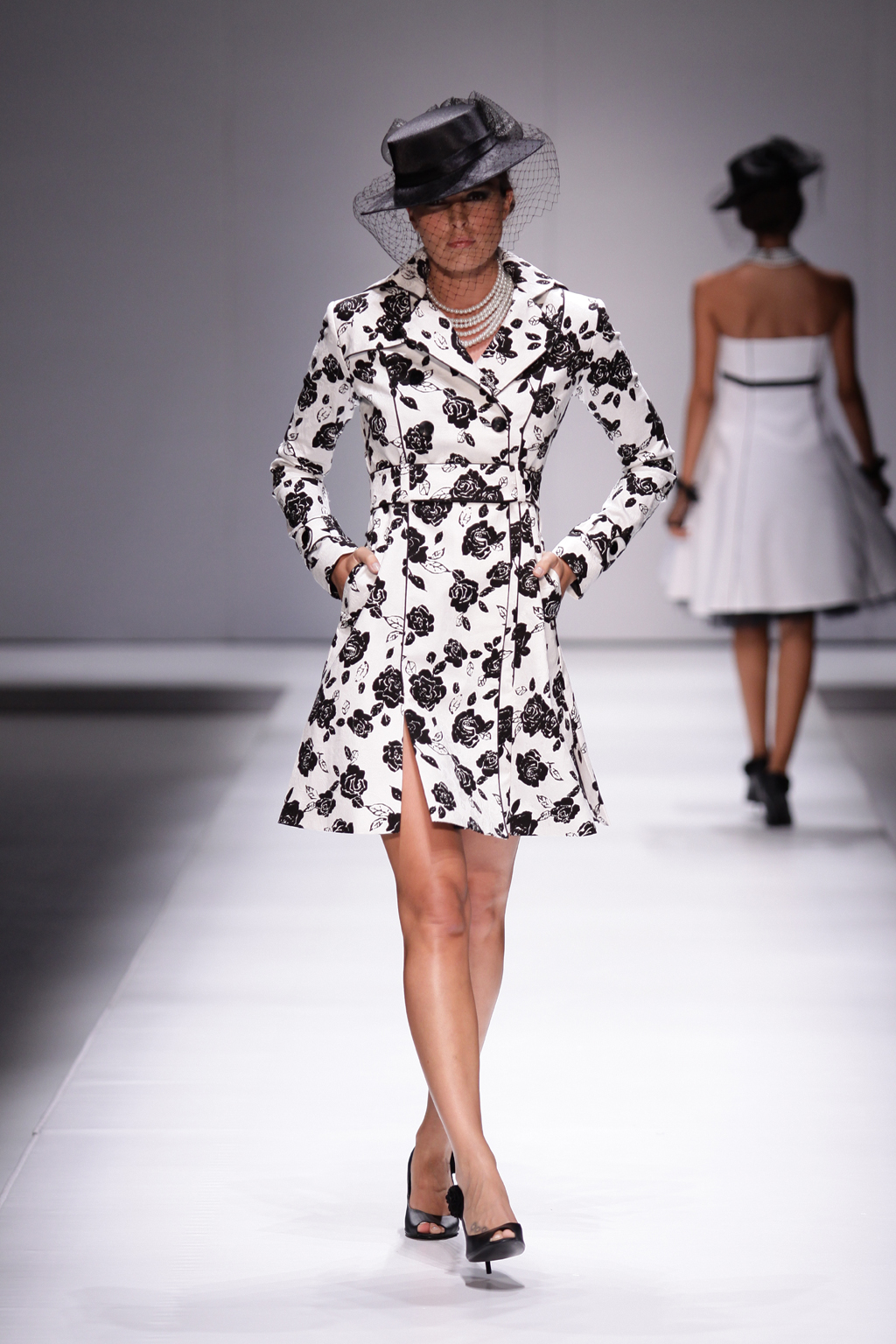
