= Ian Bremmer =

American political scientist (born 1969)

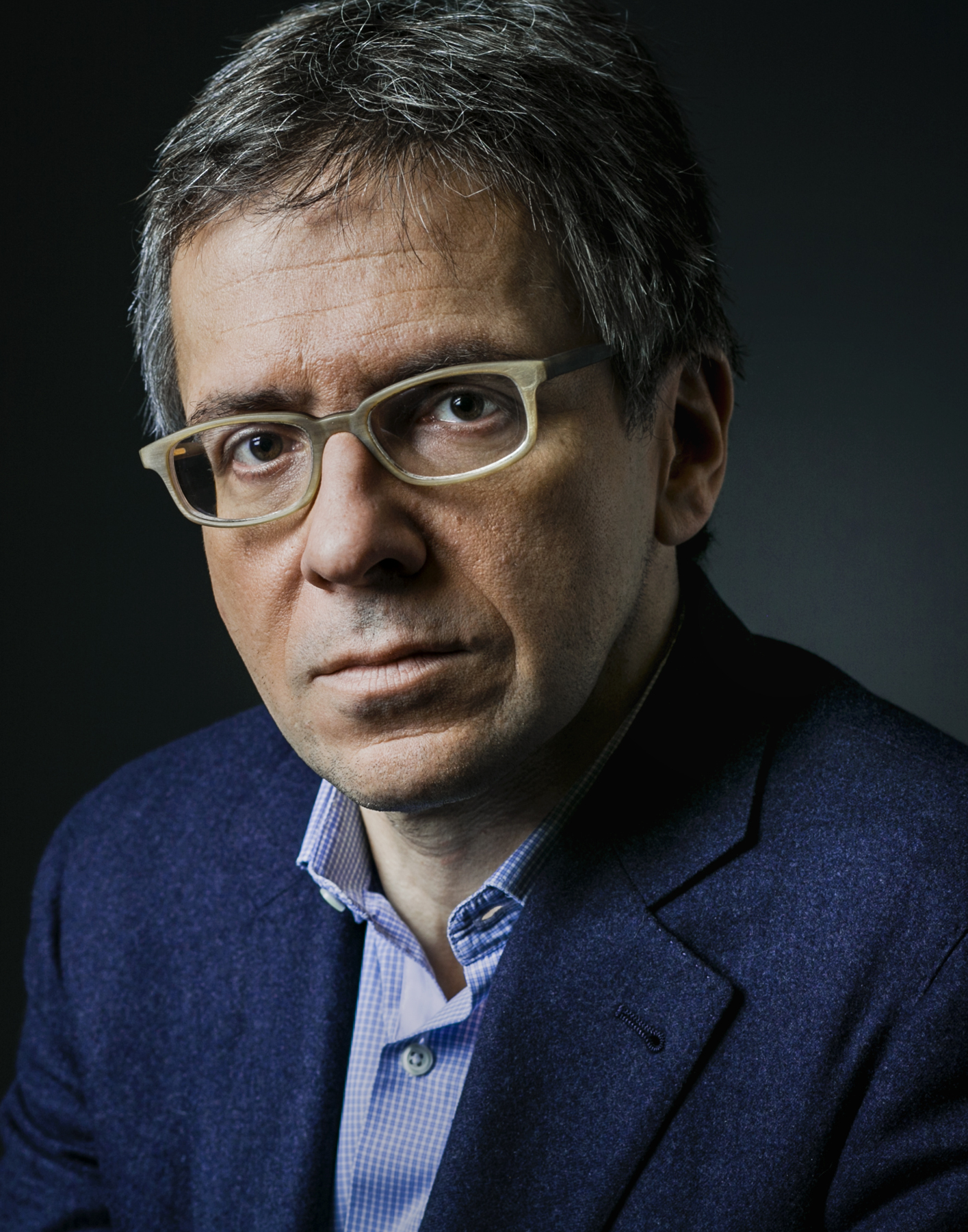
- Bremmer in 2017
- Born: Ian Arthur Bremmer; November 12, 1969 (age 57); Chelsea, Massachusetts, U.S.
- Education: Tulane University (BA); Stanford University (MA, PhD)

YouTube information
- Channel: GZERO Media
- Years active: 2017–present
- Subscribers: 1.56 million
- Views: 330 million
- Last updated: September 5, 2026
- Website: Official website

Ian Arthur Bremmer (born November 12, 1969) is an American political scientist, author, and entrepreneur focused on global political risk. He is the founder and president of Eurasia Group, a political risk research and consulting firm. He is also founder of GZERO Media, a digital media firm.

== Early life and education ==
Bremmer is of Armenian, Syrian (from his maternal grandmother), Italian, and German descent, the son of Maria J. (née Scrivano) and Arthur Bremmer. His father served in the Korean War, and died at the age of 46 when Bremmer was four. Bremmer grew up in housing projects in Chelsea, Massachusetts, near Boston. He enrolled in St. Dominic Savio High School in East Boston at age 11.

At 15, he enrolled in university and went on to earn a BA degree in international relations, magna cum laude, from Tulane University in 1989. Bremmer subsequently obtained an MA degree in 1991 and a PhD in 1994, both in political science from Stanford University. His doctoral dissertation was "The politics of ethnicity: Russians in the Ukraine".

== Career ==
=== Eurasia Group ===
In 1998, Bremmer founded the political risk research and consulting firm Eurasia Group in the offices of the World Policy Institute in New York City. The firm opened a London office in 2000; a Washington, DC office (2005); a Tokyo office (2015); San Francisco and São Paulo offices (2016); Brasilia and Singapore offices (2017); and a Mexico City office (2025). Initially focused on emerging markets, Eurasia Group expanded to include frontier and developed economies and established practices focused on geo-technology and energy issues. Bremmer co-authors Eurasia Group’s annual Top Risks report, a forecast of 10 geopolitical risks for the year ahead.

=== Eurasia Group Foundation ===
In 2016, Bremmer founded the Eurasia Group Foundation (EGF), a 501(c)3 public charity. Bremmer currently serves as the Eurasia Group Foundation’s board president.

=== GZERO Media ===
In 2017, Bremmer and Eurasia Group launched digital media company GZERO Media, and a US national public television show called GZERO World with Ian Bremmer on PBS. The company’s name refers to the term coined by Bremmer in Every Nation for Itself to describe a world where no country or group of countries has the political and economic leverage to drive an international agenda or provide global public goods. As a part of the company's public outreach concept, they have a recurring segment, Puppet Regime, which makes use of street interviews and short narrative sketch formats using puppets.

=== Appointments ===
In 2013, he was named Global Research Professor at New York University and in 2019, Columbia University's School of International and Public Affairs announced that Bremmer would teach an Applied Geopolitics course at the school. He delivered their Commencement Address in 2024.

== Political reporting ==
In January 2000, Bremmer wrote that Vladimir Putin's rise to power would lead to a Russia which would "reflect the Russian people's desire for a strong state" and create a "framework for real market democracy".

In March 2016, Bremmer sent a weekly note to clients where he unintentionally came up with the "America First" slogan used by Donald Trump. The note described then-candidate Trump's foreign policy not as isolationism but as a policy of "America First", a transactional, unilateralist perspective that was more a Chinese than American framework for foreign policy. Bremmer used the term to help explain Trump's foreign policy views and not as a campaign slogan. A few weeks later, The New York Times reporters David Sanger and Maggie Haberman, both of whom receive Bremmer's weekly note, conducted Trump's first foreign policy interview and asked him if he would describe himself as an isolationist. He said no. They then asked Trump if he considered himself an adherent of "America First". Trump said yes and liked the term so much he started using it himself. Haberman later credited Bremmer with coming up with “America First” to describe Trump’s foreign policy. The phrase was commonplace from the time Woodrow Wilson first used it in his 1916 campaign (see America First).

In July 2017, Bremmer broke news of a second, previously undisclosed meeting between Presidents Trump and Putin during the G20 heads of state dinner in Hamburg. He wrote about the meeting in his weekly client note and later appeared on Charlie Rose to discuss the meeting's implications. Other major media outlets quickly picked up the news. Newsweek profiled Bremmer in an article titled "Who is Eurasia Group's Ian Bremmer, the risk consultant who exposed the second Trump-Putin meeting?" Trump initially denied that his second meeting with Putin had taken place and called Bremmer's report "fake news." However, then-White House Press Secretary Sarah Huckabee Sanders later held a press conference and confirmed the second meeting had occurred.

In 2019, Donald Trump posted a tweet that appeared to praise North Korean leader Kim Jong Un for criticizing rival Joe Biden: "I have confidence that Chairman Kim will keep his promise to me, [and] also smiled when he called Swampman Joe Biden a low IQ individual, [and] worse." In reaction, Bremmer tweeted, "President Trump in Tokyo: 'Kim Jong Un is smarter and would make a better President than Sleepy Joe Biden.'" After he was criticized on Twitter for appearing to quote Trump falsely, Bremmer acknowledged that Trump had not spoken as Bremmer had quoted him and suggested that the statement was facetious, calling it "objectively a completely ludicrous quote." Trump used the incident to call for stronger libel laws.

== Writing ==
Bremmer has published 11 books on global affairs, including the New York Times best-sellers Us vs Them: The Failure of Globalism and The Power of Crisis: How Three Threats—And Our Response—Will Change the World. In addition, he is the foreign-affairs columnist and editor-at-large for Time and a contributor for the Financial Times A-List.

=== J-Curve ===

Bremmer's book, The J Curve, outlines the link between a country's openness and its stability. While many countries are stable because they are open (the United States, France, Japan), others are stable because they are closed (North Korea, Cuba, Iraq under Saddam Hussein). States can travel both forward (right) and backward (left) along this J curve, so stability and openness are never secure. The J is steeper on the left-hand side, as it is easier for a leader in a failed state to create stability by closing the country than to build a civil society and establish accountable institutions; the curve is higher on the far right because states that prevail in opening their societies (Eastern Europe, for example) ultimately become more stable than authoritarian regimes. The book was listed as a top 10 pick by The Economist in 2006.

=== State capitalism ===
In 2010 Bremmer published the book The End of the Free Market: Who Wins the War Between States and Corporations. Bremmer said the 2008 financial crisis had made it "harder for westerners to champion a free-market system and easier for China and Russia to argue that only governments can save economies on the brink". The crisis provided evidence that "enlightened state management will offer protection from the natural excesses of free markets".

=== G-Zero ===
The term G-Zero world refers to a breakdown in global leadership brought about by a decline of Western influence and the inability of other nations to fill the void. It is a reference to a perceived shift away from the pre-eminence of the G7 industrialized countries and the expanded G20 major economies, which includes emerging powers like China, India, Brazil, Turkey, and others. In his book Every Nation for Itself: Winners and Losers in a G-Zero World (New York: Portfolio, 2012), Bremmer explains that, in the G-Zero, no country or group of countries has the political and economic leverage to drive an international agenda or provide global public goods.

=== Weaponization of finance ===
The term weaponization of finance refers to the foreign policy strategy of using incentives (access to capital markets) and penalties (varied types of sanctions) as tools of coercive diplomacy. In his Eurasia Group Top Risks 2015 report. Bremmer coins the term weaponization of finance to describe the ways in which the United States is using its influence to affect global outcomes. Rather than rely on traditional elements of America's security advantage – including US-led alliances such as NATO and multilateral institutions such as the World Bank and the International Monetary Fund – Bremmer argues that the US is now "weaponizing finance" by limiting access to the American marketplace and to US banks as an instrument of its foreign and security policy.

=== Pivot state ===
Bremmer uses pivot state to describe a nation that is able to build profitable relationships with multiple other major powers without becoming overly reliant on any one of them. This ability to hedge allows a pivot state to avoid capture—in terms of security or economy—at the hands of a single country. At the opposite end of the spectrum are shadow states, frozen within the influence of a single power. Canada is an example of a pivot state: with significant trade ties with both the United States and Asia, and formal security ties with NATO, it is hedged against conflict with any single major power. Mexico, on the other hand, is a shadow state due to its overwhelming reliance on the US economy. In Every Nation for Itself, Bremmer states "the ability to pivot is a critical advantage".

=== Geopolitical recession ===
Bremmer coined the term “geopolitical recession” to describe the current geopolitical environment, one defined by an unwinding of the former US-led global order. Unlike economic recessions, linked to frequent boom and bust cycles, Bremmer sees geopolitical recessions as much longer cycles that are less likely to be recognized. He sees the present geopolitical recession as defined by deteriorating relations between the US and its traditional allies—particularly the Europeans—as China is rising and creating an alternative international political and economic architecture. Bremmer argues that the overall result is a more fragmented approach to global governance, an increase in geopolitical tail risks, and a reduced ability to respond effectively to major international crises.

=== World Data Organization ===
Bremmer proposed creating a “World Data Organization” to forestall a division in technology ecosystems due to conflict between the United States and China. He described it as a digital version of the World Trade Organization, arguing that the United States, Europe, Japan, and other “governments that believe in online openness and transparency” should collaborate to set standards for artificial intelligence, data, privacy, citizens’ rights, and intellectual property. 2020 Democratic party presidential nominee candidate Andrew Yang expressed his support for such an organization during his campaign.

=== Technopolarity ===
In 2021, Foreign Affairs published Bremmer's article The Technopolar Moment. Drawing on the swift response by tech companies in the aftermath of the 2021 United States Capitol Riot, Bremmer wrote that tech giants like Amazon, Apple, Facebook, Google, and Alibaba have accumulated more power than any large corporations of the past. He wrote these non state actors are now shaping geopolitics and exercise a form of sovereignty over a rapidly expanding digital space that is out of reach of national governments.

== Bibliography ==
=== Books ===
- Soviet Nationalities Problems. (edited with Norman Naimark), (Stanford: Stanford Center for Russian and East European Studies: 1990). ISBN 0-87725-195-9
- Nations and Politics in the Soviet Successor States. (edited with Raymond Taras), (Cambridge: Cambridge University Press, 1993). ISBN 0-521-43860-8
- New States, New Politics: Building the Post-Soviet Nations. (edited with Raymond Taras), (Cambridge: Cambridge University Press, 1997). ISBN 0-521-57799-3
- The J Curve: A New Way to Understand Why Nations Rise and Fall. (Simon & Schuster, 2006; revised paperback, 2007). ISBN 0-7432-7471-7
- Managing Strategic Surprise: Lessons from Risk Management & Risk Assessment. (edited with Paul Bracken and David Gordon), (Cambridge: Cambridge University Press, 2008). ISBN 0-521-88315-6
- The Fat Tail: The Power of Political Knowledge for Strategic Investing. (with Preston Keat), (New York: Oxford University Press, 2009; revised paperback, 2010). ISBN 0-19-532855-8
- The End of the Free Market: Who Wins the War Between States and Corporations. (New York: Portfolio, 2010; revised paperback 2011). ISBN 978-1-59184-301-6
- Every Nation for Itself: Winners and Losers in a G-Zero World. (New York: Portfolio, May 2012; revised paperback 2013). ISBN 978-1-59184-468-6
- Superpower: Three Choices for America's Role in the World. (New York: Portfolio, May 2015). ISBN 978-1591847472
- Us vs Them: The Failure of Globalism. (New York: Portfolio, April 2018). ISBN 978-0525533184
- The Power of Crisis: How Three Threats--And Our Response--Will Change The World. (New York: Simon and Schuster, May 2022). ISBN 978-1982167509

=== Articles ===
- Bremmer, Ian (March 2–9, 2020). "What Germany's election bump may mean for the E.U.". Time Magazine. 195 (7–8) (International ed.): 19. (Note: Online version is titled "How Germany’s election will affect the E.U.")
