= Eurasia Group =

Political risk consultancy

Coordinates: 40°44′25″N 73°59′25″W

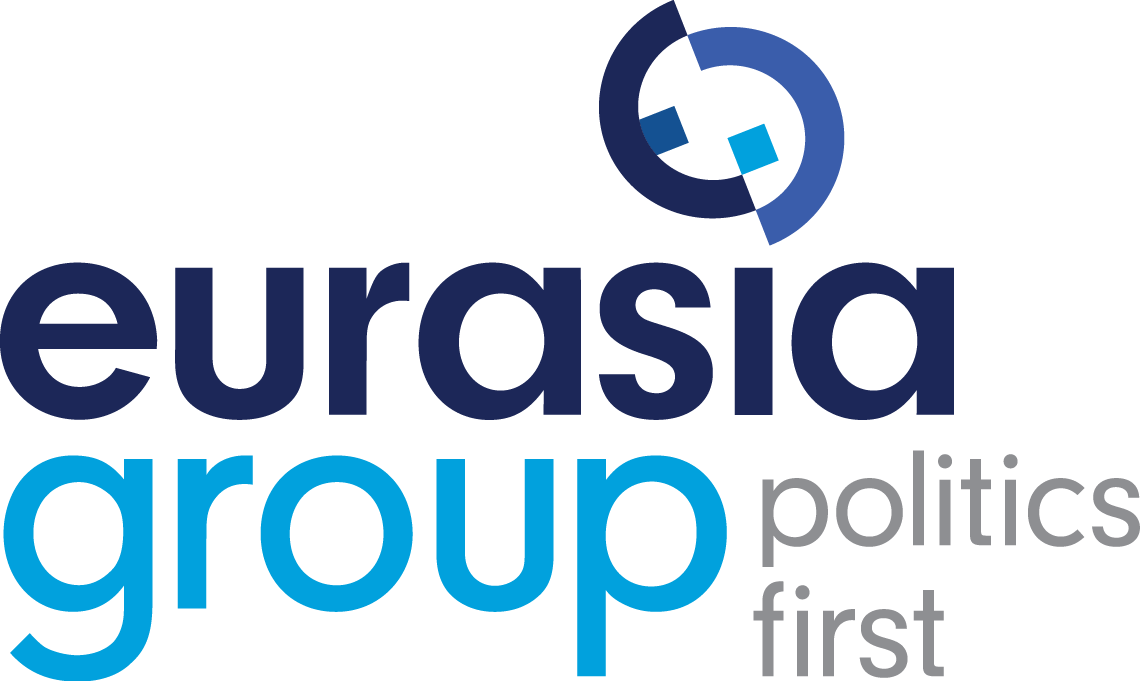
- Type: Corporation
- Industry: Consulting; Professional services
- Founded: 1998
- Headquarters: New York City, United States
- Key people: Ian Bremmer, Founder, President; Maziar Minovi, CEO
- Products: Professional services
- Website: www.eurasiagroup.net

Eurasia Group is a political risk consultancy founded in 1998 by Ian Bremmer.

== History ==
Eurasia Group reports on emerging markets including frontier and developed economies, in addition to establishing practices focused on geo-technology and energy issues. The organization's 2011 "Top Risks report" description of a G-Zero world lacking global leadership received attention at the World Economic Forum’s Annual Meeting in Davos in 2011, as well as in international media. American politics led the firm’s 2020 report, which was updated and re-released in the wake of the coronavirus pandemic.

In 2017, Eurasia Group launched a media company called GZERO Media, featuring digital programming as well as a US national public television show called GZERO World with Ian Bremmer.

On January 3, 2023, at Bloomberg, Ian Bremmer discussed the TOP-10 risks for the world to face in 2023 according to Eurasia Group. The top ten risks of 2024, as outlined by Ian Bremmer and Cliff Kupchan in their 37-page report, and published in an 8 January article in Time, are as follows: the United States grappling with internal challenges; Middle East teetering on the edge; Ukraine facing partition; challenges posed by ungoverned artificial intelligence; the presence of an Axis of rogue nations; absence of a recovery in China; the struggle for critical minerals; minimal margin for error; return of El Niño; and engaging in risky business. Additionally, three potential Red Herrings for 2024 were identified: a crisis between the United States and China; populist takeover of European politics; and tensions between BRICS and G7.

== Partnerships ==
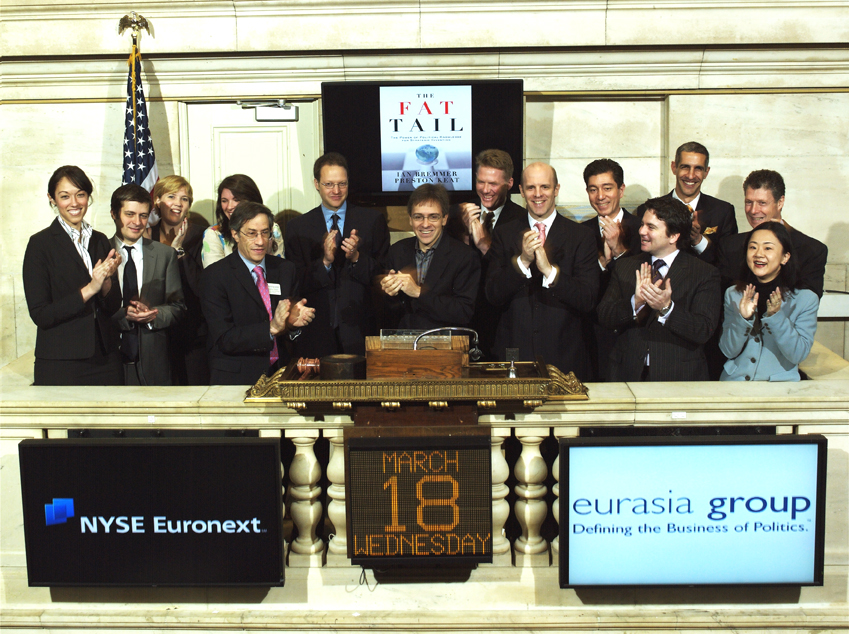
Eurasia Group ringing the opening bell at the New York Stock Exchange

In 2005, Eurasia Group purchased Intellibridge, a political risk consultancy founded by David Rothkopf in 1999. In 2007, Citi Private Bank announced it was partnering with Eurasia Group and their global clients would have "exclusive access to Eurasia Group's unique political risk analysis." Announcing a partnership with NYSE Euronext, Eurasia Group rang the opening bell at the New York Stock Exchange on March 18, 2009. In 2011, Bank of America entered into a partnership with Eurasia Group which allowed BofA's 20,000 Merrill Lynch and US Trust advisors access to Eurasia's global research. Eurasia Group announced a partnership with Nikko Asset Management in 2015 to incorporate political risk analysis into emerging market investment funds. According to The Wall Street Journal, "this is the first such partnership between the consultancy and an asset manager". In 2017, KPMG International partnered with Eurasia Group.

== Members ==
Many of Eurasia Group's leaders and advisors are former international politicians including Catherine Ashton, John Baird, Sigmar Gabriel, Marietje Schaake, and Gerald Butts.

== Similar companies ==
- Control Risks Group
- Oxford Analytica
- Roubini Global Economics
- Le Beck International
- Economist Intelligence Unit
