= Authoritarian socialism =

Socialist economic-political system

Authoritarian socialism, or socialism from above, is an economic and political system supporting some form of socialist economics while rejecting political pluralism. As a term, it represents a set of economic-political systems describing themselves as "socialist" and rejecting the liberal-democratic concepts of multi-party politics, freedom of assembly, habeas corpus, and freedom of expression, either due to fear of counter-revolution or as a means to socialist ends. Journalists and scholars have characterised several countries, most notably the Soviet Union, China, Cuba, and their allies, as authoritarian socialist states.

Contrasted to democratic socialist, social democratic, anti-statist, and libertarian forms of socialism, authoritarian socialism encompasses some forms of African, Arab and Latin American socialism. Although considered an authoritarian or illiberal form of state socialism, often referred to and conflated as socialism by critics and argued as a form of state capitalism by left-wing critics, those states were ideologically Marxist–Leninist and declared themselves to be workers' and peasants' or people's democracies. Academics, political commentators and other scholars tend to distinguish between authoritarian socialist and democratic socialist states, with the first represented in the Soviet Bloc and the latter represented by Western Bloc countries which have been democratically governed by socialist parties - such as Britain, France, Sweden and Western social-democracies in general, among others. Those who support authoritative socialist regimes are pejoratively known as tankies.

While originating with the utopian socialism advocated by Edward Bellamy (1850–1898) and identified by Hal Draper (1914–1990) as a "socialism from above", authoritarian socialism has been overwhelmingly associated with the Soviet model and contrasted or compared to authoritarian capitalism. Authoritarian socialism has been criticised by the left and right both theoretically and for its practice.

== Political roots ==
=== Socialism from above ===
Authoritarian socialism is derived from the concept of socialism from above. Hal Draper defined socialism from above as the philosophy which employs an elite administration to run the socialist state. The other side of socialism is a more democratic socialism from below. The idea of socialism from above is much more frequently discussed in elite circles than socialism from below—even if that is the Marxist ideal—because it is more practical. Draper viewed socialism from below as being the purer, more Marxist version of socialism. According to Draper, Karl Marx and Friedrich Engels were devoutly opposed to any socialist institution that was "conducive to superstitious authoritarianism". Draper makes the argument that this division echoes the division between "reformist or revolutionary, peaceful or violent, democratic or authoritarian, etc." and further identifies elitism as being one of the six major varieties of socialism from above, among them "Philanthropism", "Elitism", "Pannism", "Communism", "Permeationism" and "Socialism-from-Outside".

According to Arthur Lipow, Marx and Engels were "the founders of modern revolutionary democratic socialism", described as a form of "socialism from below" that is "based on a mass working-class movement, fighting from below for the extension of democracy and human freedom". This type of socialism is contrasted to that of the "authoritarian, antidemocratic creed" and "the various totalitarian collectivist ideologies which claim the title of socialism" as well as "the many varieties of 'socialism from above' which have led in the twentieth century to movements and state forms in which a despotic 'new class' rules over a statified economy in the name of socialism", a division that "runs through the history of the socialist movement". Lipow identifies Bellamyism and Stalinism as two prominent authoritarian socialist currents within the history of the socialist movement.

The authoritarian–libertarian struggles and disputes within the socialist movement go back to the First International and the expulsion in 1872 of the anarchists, who went on to lead the Anti-authoritarian International and then founded their own libertarian international, the Anarchist St. Imier International. In 1888, the individualist anarchist Benjamin Tucker, who proclaimed himself to be an anarchistic socialist and libertarian socialist in opposition to the authoritarian state socialism and the compulsory communism, included the full text of a "Socialistic Letter" by Ernest Lesigne in his essay on "State Socialism and Anarchism". According to Lesigne, there are two types of socialism: "One is dictatorial, the other libertarian". Tucker's two socialisms were the authoritarian state socialism which he associated to the Marxist school and the libertarian anarchist socialism, or simply anarchism, that he advocated. Tucker noted that the fact that the authoritarian "State Socialism has overshadowed other forms of Socialism gives it no right to a monopoly of the Socialistic idea". According to Tucker, what those two schools of socialism had in common was the labor theory of value and the ends, by which anarchism pursued different means.

According to George Woodcock, the Second International turned "into a battleground over the issue of libertarian versus authoritarian socialism. Not only did they effectively present themselves as champions of minority rights; they also provoked the German Marxists into demonstrating a dictatorial intolerance which was a factor in preventing the British labour movement from following the Marxist direction indicated by such leaders as H. M. Hyndman". According to anarchists such as the authors of An Anarchist FAQ, forms of socialism from above such as authoritarian socialism or state socialism are the real oxymorons and the libertarian socialism from below represents true socialism. For anarchists and other anti-authoritarian socialists, socialism "can only mean a classless and anti-authoritarian (i.e., libertarian) society in which people manage their own affairs, either as individuals or as part of a group (depending on the situation). In other words, it implies self-management in all aspects of life", including at the workplace. Historian Herbert L. Osgood described anarchism as "the extreme antithesis" of authoritarian communism and state socialism.

Socialists in general and socialist writers, including Dimitri Volkogonov, acknowledged that the actions of authoritarian socialist leaders have damaged "the enormous appeal of socialism generated by the October Revolution". Some right-wing authors have described conservative socialism, fascism and Prussian socialism, among other forms of paternalistic conservatism and right-wing politics, as authoritarian socialism.

=== Utopian socialism ===
The economy of the 3rd century BCE Mauryan Empire of India was described as "a socialized monarchy" and "a sort of state socialism". Elements of authoritarian socialist thought were discerned in the politics of ancient Greek philosophers such as Aristotle and Plato. The first advocates of modern socialism favoured social levelling in order to create a meritocratic or technocratic society based on individual talent. Henri de Saint-Simon is regarded as the first individual to coin the term socialism. Saint-Simon was fascinated by the enormous potential of science and technology and advocated a socialist society that would eliminate the disorderly aspects of capitalism and would be based on equal opportunities. He advocated the creation of a society in which each person was ranked according to his or her capacities and rewarded according to his or her work. The key focus of Saint-Simon's socialism was on administrative efficiency and industrialism and a belief that science was the key to progress. This was accompanied by a desire to implement a rationally organised economy based on planning and geared towards large-scale scientific progress and material progress.

The first major fictional work that proposed an authoritarian socialist state was Edward Bellamy's novel Looking Backward, which depicted a bureaucratic socialist utopia. Bellamy distanced himself from radical socialist values, and in many ways, his ideal society still imitated many of the systems in the late 19th century United States. However, his book inspired a mass political movement called nationalism within the United States in the late 1800s. Those Nationalist Clubs, so named because of their desire to nationalize industry, were strong supporters of the populists, who wanted the nationalisation of the railroad and telegraph systems. Despite their propaganda and involvement in politics, the nationalist movement began to decline in 1893 due to the financial difficulties of its main publications and Bellamy's failing health, which essentially disappeared by the turn of the century. In the society depicted in the novel, private property has been abolished in favor of state ownership, social classes were eliminated, and all minimal and relatively easy work was done voluntarily by all citizens between the ages of 21 and 45. Workers were rewarded and recognized via a ranking system based on the army. The government is the most powerful and respected institution, necessary for providing and maintaining this utopia. Arthur Lipow identifies the bureaucratic ruling of this ideal society as a quasi-military organisation of both economic and social relations. Bellamy elevated the modern military as a catalyst for national interest.

The biggest critique of Bellamy's society is that it is based on the idea of socialism from above. The regime is imposed on the people by an expert elite, and there is no democratic control or individual liberty. Lipow argues that this inherently leads to authoritarianism, writing: "If the workers and the vast majority were a brutish mass, there could be no question of forming a political movement out of them nor of giving them the task of creating a socialist society. The new institutions would not be created and shaped from below but would, of necessity, correspond to the plan laid down in advance by the utopian planner".

In his preface to Peter Kropotkin's book The Conquest of Bread, Kent Bromley considered the ideas of utopian socialists such as the French François-Noël Babeuf and the Italian Philippe Buonarroti to be representative of authoritarian socialism as opposed to the French socialist Charles Fourier, described as the founder of the libertarian socialism.

=== Austrian and Chicago schools of economics ===
While distinguishing between "voluntary and coercive strands", the Austrian and Chicagoan understanding and characterisation of socialism is one based on authoritarianism and statism. One Austrian definition of socialism is based on the state socialist notion of "state ownership of capital goods". Another is that socialism "must be conceptualized as an institutional interference with or aggression against private property and private property claims. Capitalism, on the other hand, is a social system based on the explicit recognition of private property and of nonaggressive, contractual exchanges between private property owners".

Friedrich Hayek, an Austrian School economist, was one of the leading academic critics of collectivism in the 20th century. He recognized and was acutely critical of the trends of socialism from above in collectivism, including theories based on voluntary cooperation. Unlike Bellamy, who praised the idea of elites implementing policies, Hayek made the argument that socialism inherently leads to tyranny, claiming that "[i]n order to achieve their ends, the planners must create power – power over men wielded by other men – of a magnitude never before known. Democracy is an obstacle to this suppression of freedom which the centralized direction of economic activity requires. Hence arises the clash between planning and democracy". Hayek argued that both fascism and socialism are based in central economic planning and value the state over the individual. According to Hayek, it is in this way that it becomes possible for totalitarian leaders to rise to power as happened in the years following World War I. Austrian School economists such as Hayek and his mentor Ludwig von Mises also used the word socialism as a synonym for authoritarian socialism, central planning and state socialism, linking it to fascism, with Hayek writing that "[a]lthough our modern socialists' promise of greater freedom is genuine and sincere, in recent years observer after observer has been impressed by the unforeseen consequences of socialism, the extraordinary similarity in many respects of the conditions under 'communism' and 'fascism'". Chicago School economists such as Milton Friedman also equated socialism with centralized economic planning as well as authoritarian socialist states and command or state-directed economies, referring to capitalism as the free market. However, fascism and its variants such as Falangism and Nazism, among other fascist-inspired military regimes, are considered by scholars to be a far-right, anti-socialist ideologies that largely adopted corporatist economic policies, with economic planning relegated to war efforts.

Mises criticised left-leaning, social liberal policies such as progressive taxation as socialism, getting up during a Mont Pelerin Society meeting and referring to those "expressing the view that there could be a justification" for them as "a bunch of socialists". On the other hand, Hayek argued that the state can play a role in the economy, specifically in creating a social safety net, criticising the right and conservatism, even inspiring some towards a form of market socialism or Hayekian socialism. Hayek advocated "some provision for those threatened by the extremes of indigence or starvation due to circumstances beyond their control". Hayek argued that the "necessity of some such arrangement in an industrial society is unquestioned", be it "only in the interest of those who require protection against acts of desperation on the part of the needy", with some also noting that "he advocated mandatory universal health care and unemployment insurance, enforced, if not directly provided, by the state" and that "Hayek was adamant about this". Mises also equated central banking with socialism and central planning. According to Mises, central banks enable the commercial banks to fund loans at artificially low interest rates, thereby inducing an unsustainable expansion of bank credit and impeding any subsequent contraction. However, Hayek disagreed and stated that the need for central banking control was inescapable. Similarly, Friedman concluded that the government does have a role in the monetary system and believed that the Federal Reserve System should ultimately be replaced with a computer program. While critical of social welfare, especially Social Security, arguing that it had created welfare dependency, Friedman was supportive of the state provision of some public goods that private businesses are not considered as being able to provide, advocated a negative income tax in place of most welfare and his views were grounded in a belief that while "market forces [...] accomplish wonderful things", they "cannot ensure a distribution of income that enables all citizens to meet basic economic needs". Some Austrian School economists follow Mises in arguing that policies supported by Hayek and Friedman constituted a form of socialism.

The Austrian and Marxian schools of economics agree in their criticism of the mixed economy, but they reach different conclusions regarding authoritarian socialist states. In Human Action, Mises argued that there can be no mixture of capitalism and socialism—either market logic or economic planning must dominate an economy. Mises elaborated on this point by contending that even if a market economy contained numerous state-run or nationalized enterprises, this would not make the economy mixed because such organizations do not alter the market economy's fundamental characteristics. These publicly owned enterprises would still be subject to market sovereignty as they would have to acquire capital goods through markets, strive to maximize profits, or at the least try to minimize costs and utilize monetary accounting for economic calculation.

Similarly, classical and orthodox Marxist theorists dispute the viability of a mixed economy as a middle ground between socialism and capitalism. Irrespective of enterprise ownership, either the capitalist law of value and accumulation of capital drive the economy or conscious planning and non-monetary forms of valuation such as calculation in kind ultimately drive the economy. From the Great Depression onward, extant mixed economies in the Western world are still functionally capitalist because they operate on the basis of capital accumulation. On this basis, some Marxists and non-Marxists alike, including academics, economists, and intellectuals, argue that the Soviet Union et al. were state capitalist countries and that rather than being socialist planned economies, they represented an administrative-command system. Already in 1985, John Howard argued that the common description of the Soviet-type economic planning as planned economy was misleading because while central planning did play an important role, the Soviet economy was de facto characterized by the priority of highly centralized management over planning. Therefore, the correct term would be that of an economy that is centrally managed rather than centrally planned. This has been attributed to both the economy of the Soviet Union and that of its allies which closely followed the Soviet model. On the other hand, while describing wealthy mixed economies as still "capitalist", Austrian School economists routinely describe mixed-economy policies as "socialism". Similarly, they describe fascist regimes such as Fascist Italy and Nazi Germany as "socialist", although scholars describe them as being corporatist regimes.

==== Response ====
The Austrian-Chicagoan concept of authoritarian socialism has been criticized. In particular, it has been criticised for conflating social democracy and other forms of reformist and democratic socialism with authoritarian and state socialism. In the United Kingdom, British Conservative politicians such as Margaret Thatcher "loosely labelled socialism" and conflated what "others would call social democracy, corporatism, Keynesianism or the mixed economy" with authoritarian socialism, defined as "[g]overnment support for inefficient industries, punitive taxation, regulation of the labour market, price controls – everything that interfered with the functioning of the free economy". This is particularly relevant in the United States, where the term socialization has been mistakenly used to refer to any state or government-operated industry or service (the proper term for such being either municipalization or nationalization). It has also been incorrectly used to mean any tax-funded programs, whether privately run or government-run. Similarly, socialism has become a pejorative used in the United States by conservatives and libertarians to taint liberal and progressive policies, proposals and public figures.

People such as Hayek, Mises, and Friedman have also been criticised for hypocrisy due to claiming to oppose authoritarian socialism yet supporting liberal dictatorships such as that of the military dictatorship of Chile under Augusto Pinochet. Mises comments about fascism have been criticized, although others have defended him. Similarly, Hayek's involvement in dictatorships has been criticized. Hayek has stated: "As long term institutions, I am totally against dictatorships. But a dictatorship may be a necessary system for a transitional period. [...] Personally I prefer a liberal dictatorship to democratic government devoid of liberalism. My personal impression – and this is valid for South America – is that in Chile, for example, we will witness a transition from a dictatorial government to a liberal government". Hayek defended himself arguing that he had "not been able to find a single person even in much maligned Chile who did not agree that personal freedom was much greater under Pinochet than it had been under [Salvador] Allende", the democratic socialist Chilean President democratically elected in 1970 as the first self-professed Marxist to be elected president in a country with liberal democracy and ousted in a CIA-backed military coup. For Hayek, the distinction between authoritarianism and totalitarianism has much importance and he was at pains to emphasise his opposition to totalitarianism, noting that the concept of transitional dictatorship which he defended was characterised by authoritarianism, not totalitarianism. When he visited Venezuela in May 1981, Hayek was asked to comment on the prevalence of totalitarian regimes in Latin America. In reply, Hayek warned against confusing "totalitarianism with authoritarianism" and said he was unaware of "any totalitarian governments in Latin America. The only one was Chile under Allende". For Hayek, totalitarian signifies something very specific, namely the intention to "organize the whole of society" to attain a "definite social goal," which is stark in contrast to "liberalism and individualism".

Friedman's involvement in the Chilean military dictatorship has also been criticized as he served as an economic advisor. Under Pinochet, Chile followed the economic policies of Friedman and his Chicago Boys. While Friedman did not criticize Pinochet's dictatorship at the time, nor the assassinations, illegal imprisonments, torture, or other atrocities that were well known by then, he defended his unofficial adviser position, arguing: "I do not consider it as evil for an economist to render technical economic advice to the Chilean Government, any more than I would regard it as evil for a physician to give technical medical advice to the Chilean Government to help end a medical plague". Although Friedman criticized Chile's political system, he argued that "free markets would undermine [Pinochet's] political centralization and political control", that criticism over his role in Chile missed his main contention that freer markets resulted in freer people and that Chile's unfree economy had caused the military government. Friedman advocated for free markets, which undermined "political centralization and political control". However, some economists have argued that the experience of Chile in this period indicated a failure of Friedman's policies, claiming that there was little net economic growth from 1975 to 1982 (during the so-called "pure Monetarist experiment"). After the crisis of 1982, the state controlled more of the economy than it had under the previous socialist regime, and sustained economic growth only came after the later reforms that privatized the economy while social indicators remained poor. Pinochet's dictatorship made the unpopular economic reorientation possible by repressing opposition. Rather than a triumph of the free market, it has been described as "combining neo-liberal sutures and interventionist cures". By the time of sustained growth, the Chilean government had "cooled its neo-liberal ideological fever" and "controlled its exposure to world financial markets and maintained its efficient copper company in public hands".

Another criticism is that proponents of the theory overstate the strength of their case by describing socialism as impossible rather than inefficient. In explaining why he is not an Austrian School economist, Bryan Caplan argues that while the economic calculation problem is a problem for socialism, he denies that Mises has shown it to be fatal or that it is this particular problem that led to the collapse of authoritarian socialist states. Kristen Ghodsee, ethnographer and Professor of Russian and East European Studies at the University of Pennsylvania, posits that the triumphalist attitudes of Western powers at the end of the Cold War in particular the fixation with linking all socialist political ideals with the excesses of authoritarian socialism such as Stalinism had marginalized the left's response to the fusing of democracy with neoliberal ideology which helped undermine the former. This allowed the anger and resentment that came with the ravages of neoliberalism (i.e. economic misery, hopelessness, unemployment and rising inequality throughout the former Eastern Bloc and much of the West) to be channeled into right-wing nationalist movements in the decades that followed.

David L. Hoffmann, Distinguished Professor of History at Ohio State University, raises the issue of whether authoritarian socialist practices of state violence derived from socialist ideology. Placing authoritarian socialist ideologies such as Stalinism in an international context, he argues that many forms of state interventionism used by the Stalinist government, including social cataloging, surveillance, and concentration camps, predated the Soviet regime and originated outside of Russia. He further argues that technologies of social intervention developed in conjunction with the work of 19th-century European reformers and were greatly expanded during World War I, when state actors in all the combatant countries dramatically increased efforts to mobilize and control their populations. As the Soviet state was born at this moment of total war, it institutionalized practices of state intervention as permanent features of governance. Writing two The Guardian articles in 2002 and 2006, British journalist Seumas Milne wrote that the impact of the post-Cold War narrative that Stalin and Hitler were twin evils and therefore communism is as monstrous as Nazism "has been to relativize the unique crimes of Nazism, bury those of colonialism and feed the idea that any attempt at radical social change will always lead to suffering, killing and failure".

== Characteristics ==
=== Theory and rationale ===
Authoritarian socialism is a political-economic system that can be generally described as socialist, but one that rejects the liberal-democratic concepts of multi-party politics, freedom of assembly, habeas corpus and freedom of expression. Other features that are common to modern authoritarian socialist states starting in the 20th century include an emphasis on heavy industry for development, a single-party system to propel the goals of the state forward, the extensive use of propaganda to do the same and more.

Soviet advocates and socialists responded to this type of criticism by highlighting the ideological differences in the concept of freedom and liberty. It was noted that "Marxist–Leninist norms disparaged laissez-faire individualism (as when housing is determined by one's ability to pay)" and condemned "wide variations in personal wealth as the West has not" whilst emphasizing equality, by which they meant "free education and medical care, little disparity in housing or salaries, and so forth".

When asked to comment on the claim that former citizens of socialist states now enjoy increased freedoms, Heinz Kessler, former East German Minister of National Defence, replied: "Millions of people in Eastern Europe are now free from employment, free from safe streets, free from health care, free from social security".

=== Formation of industry ===
As authoritarian powers enforce socialist economics, the process often goes hand in hand with supporting the growth of heavy industry as a means of reaching industrialization (as can be seen with Joseph Stalin's control of the Soviet Union). Stalin's goals brought about a rapid industrialization of the Soviet economy that increased the urban population up by another 30 million people by 1930 and the production of automobiles to 200,000 per year by 1940.

Outside of the Soviet Union, two rising global participants of the early 20th century were the young states of Germany and Italy. There were many centrally planned work projects under Adolf Hitler and Benito Mussolini. The Reichsautobahn in Nazi Germany was an example of this. The construction of the Autobahn and industries surrounding highway construction elevated the percentage of employed Germans throughout the construction. In Fascist Italy, projects such as the Battle for Grain or the Battle for Land are public work projects that socialism would traditionally support. However, the Axis powers, among other fascist regimes, favoured a corporatist mixed economy and were all radical anti-communists and anti-Marxists. They have been described as an example of authoritarian and totalitarian corporatism, with Mussolini choosing to subordinate private businesses to the state to better organize economic policies.

Common among authoritarian socialist regimes was autarky. While also adopted by other authoritarian regimes, it was pursued for vastly different reasons. Communist states pursued autarky to reach a post-scarcity economy to guarantee a communist society whereas fascist regimes pursued it for nationalist and imperialist goals such as for Nazi Germany's living space, with fascist and far-right movements striving for autarky. They established extensive capital subordinates in efforts to ready for expansionist war, while controlling traditional business and commerce elites. Communist states and fascist regimes also differed in that the latter shifted a focus on class conflict to a focus on conflict between nations and races.

A Marxist societal analysis puts forth that the process of industrialization in the 19th century placed the current metropoles in their current positions of power. In theory, industrialization should allow the regime of non-metropoles to raise the standard of living and competitiveness of their populations to be on economic par with these metropoles. However, aside from Russia and a number of former Eastern Bloc members, many post-Soviet states and both former and current authoritarian socialist states are not categorized as industrialized countries.

=== Single-party system ===
Authoritarian socialist states often oppose the multi-party system to instill power of the government into a single party that could be led by a single head of state. The rationale behind this being that elites have the time and resources to enforce socialist theory because in this socialist state the interests of the people are represented by the party or head of the party. Hal Draper referred to this as socialism from above. According to Draper, socialism from above comes in six strains or forms that rationalize and require an elite group at the top of a socialist system. This differs from a Marxist perspective that would advocate for socialism from below, a more pure and democratically run form of socialism.

Outside of Europe, Eritrea, Mozambique and Vietnam stand as examples of states that were socialist and ruled by a single-party at some point in the 20th century. In Eritrea, the ruling party emerging in 1970 was the Eritrean People's Liberation Front (EPLF) and with control of the state the EPLF began work on socialist ideals such as broadening women's rights and expanding education. In Mozambique, the single-state rule of FRELIMO occurred while the state was still ideologically socialist right after Portuguese rule was ending in 1975. In Vietnam, the Communist Party of Vietnam considers itself to be in transition to socialism and also the "vanguard of the working people and the whole nation".

=== Propaganda ===
Departments of propaganda are not at all rare in these regimes. The extensive use of propaganda spills into art, cinema, posters, newspapers, books. In the Soviet Union, a byproduct of strict censorship was the blossoming of Russian science fiction and fantasy as well as socialist realism. In Latin America, Che Guevara represented and acted on the idea that socialism was an international struggle by operating Radio Rebelde and having his station transmitted from Cuba to as far north as Washington D.C.

== Economics ==
There are several elemental characteristics of the authoritarian socialist economic system that distinguish it from the capitalist market economy, namely the communist party has a concentration of power in representation of the working class and the party's decisions are so integrated into public life that its economic and non-economic decisions are part of their overall actions; state ownership of the means of production in which natural resources and capital belong to society; central economic planning, the main characteristic of an authoritarian-state socialist economy; the market is planned by a central government agency, generally a state planning commission; and socially equitable distribution of the national income in which goods and services are provided for free by the state that supplement private consumption. This economic model is greatly characterized by the government's central planning. Ideally, society would be the owner as in the social ownership of the means of production, but in practice the state is the owner of the means of production. If the state is the owner, the idea is that it would work for the benefit of the working class and society as a whole. In practice, society is the owner only in theory and the political institutions governing society are completely set up by the state.

While Marxist–Leninists maintain that workers in the Soviet Union and other socialist states had genuine control over the means of production through institutions such as trade unions, democratic and libertarian socialists argue that these states had only a limited number of socialist characteristics and in practice were state capitalists that followed the capitalist mode of production. In Socialism: Utopian and Scientific, Friedrich Engels argued that state ownership does not do away with capitalism by itself, but rather it would be the final stage of capitalism, consisting of ownership and management of large-scale production and communication by the bourgeois state. In Imperialism, the Highest Stage of Capitalism and Imperialism and World Economy, both Vladimir Lenin and Nikolai Bukharin, respectively, had similarly "identified the growth of state capitalism as one of the main features of capitalism in its imperialist epoch". In The State and Revolution, Lenin wrote that "the erroneous bourgeois reformist assertion that monopoly capitalism or state-monopoly capitalism is no longer capitalism, but can now be called 'state socialism' and so on, is very common".

Several economists and scholars have argued that authoritarian socialist states did not follow a planned economy, but were rather described as following an administrative-command system and called command economies, a term that highlights the central role of hierarchical administration and public ownership of production in guiding the allocation of resources in these economic systems, where important allocation decisions are made by government authorities rather than by the workers themselves and are imposed by law. This goes against the Marxist understanding of conscious planning.

=== Central planning ===
In a centrally planned economy, there is a central planning authority usually named the State Planning Commission that is in charge of acting within the framework of social goals and the priorities designated by the party. The planning was done under the idea that leaving market indicators would allow for social advancement. The central planning authority is responsible for five specific tasks, namely determining the criteria for the economic calculations of the planning decisions; determining and quantifying targets to be achieved within the a specified period; "coordinating targets to ensure the plan is consistent and reliable; determining the methods to ensure the realization of the plan; and revising targets in accordance to changing economic calculations.

The planning process involved the creation of one-year plans, five-year plans and long-term plans. The one-year plans contained schedules and details that addressed current production and market equilibrium issues. The five-year plans integrated the political, military and economic strategy that would be pursued in the next five years as well as changes in capacity and production rates. It was done by a team of around the fifty leading experts from all the departments, ministries, professional and scientific organizations. The long-term plans encompassed a global strategy development. This plan was about goals for the state and society, not about individual responsibilities. Structural changes were a main theme.

Some economists have argued that the major reason for the economic shortcomings of authoritarian socialist states which adopted Soviet-type planning was due to their authoritarian and administrative, command nature rather than socialism itself or planning as a whole and that both economic planning and government direction of the economy through non-coercive means such as dirigisme have been practiced with success during the post-war consensus. It has been argued that authoritarian socialist states failed because they did not create rules and operational criteria for the efficient operation of state enterprises in their administrative-command allocation of resources and commodities and the lack of democracy in the political systems that the authoritarian socialist economies were combined with. They argued that form of competitive socialism that rejects dictatorship and authoritarian allocation of resources in favour of economic democracy could work and prove superior to the capitalist market economy. Others have argued that a central deficiency of such economic planning was that it was not premised on final consumer demand, but that such a system would be increasingly feasible with advances in information technology.

==== Economy of the Soviet Union ====
The essence of Soviet economics is that the communist party is the sole authority of the national interest. The party makes all the decisions, but they should take into account the desires of the population and these desires were then to be weighted into the decision making. According to Article 11 of its 1977 constitution, the main goal of the Soviet Union was to "raise the material and cultural standards of the working people". Marxist thought and its interpretation by the Soviet Union dictated that private ownership was to be banned and the nationalization of all aspects of production a necessity, yet some things were not nationalized for the sake of economic efficiency or production targets. There was an emphasis on rapid industrialization, the development of heavy industry, relegation of consumer production as non-essential and collectivization of agriculture. Soviet-type economies also used a larger proportion of their resources on investment than do market economies. The issue with this was that current consumption was undercut because of the over-investment. All these actions supported the purposes of the state, not the people.

During the 1940s–1970s, the economy of the Soviet Union grew at a rate that outpaced that of Western European nations, but by the 1980s the Soviet economy was in shambles. This has been attributed to the Era of Stagnation, a more tolerant central government and increasing military spending caused by the nuclear arms race with the United States, especially under Ronald Reagan, whose administration pursued more aggressive relations with the Soviet Union instead of détente that was preferred in the 1970s. The end to the post-war consensus and Keynesianism in the 1970s and the rise of neoliberalism and economic globalization in the 1980s also caused problems as they forced the Soviet Union and other countries to adapt and reform themselves. Unlike China, the Soviet's failure to do so further contributed to its dissolution in December 1991. A main problem of the Soviet Union was that it pushed agriculture to the bottom of its priorities and that its central planning scheme inhibited technological innovation. Despite the attempts of the Soviet Union to guarantee employment to all of its labor force, it did not satisfy the human desires of its laborers because "people want land, not collectivization. Consumers want goods, not gigantic industrial enterprise. Workers want better wages and higher living standards, not citations and medals. [And] an economy cannot be politically tailored to perfection".

The Soviet Union had a poor overall performance. Although it had high growth rates in productions, many enterprises operated with losses. Nevertheless, the Soviet Union's growth in GDP per capita compared favorably with Western Europe. In 1913, prior to both World War I and the Russian Revolution of 1917, the former Soviet Union had a GDP per capita of $1,488 in 1990 international dollars which grew 461% to $6,871 by 1990. After its dissolution in December 1991, this figure fell to $3,893 by 1998. By comparison, Western Europe grew from a higher base of $3,688 international dollars by a comparable 457% to $16,872 in the same period and reached $17,921 by 1998. From the Stalin era to the early Brezhnev era, the Soviet economy grew faster than the United States and maintained itself as the second largest economy in both nominal and purchasing power parity values for much of the Cold War until 1988, when Japan took the second place. It is also claimed that the Soviet model provided a better quality of life and human development than market economies at the same level of economic development in nearly all cases. With the dissolution of the Soviet Union followed by a rapid decrease of the quality of life, there has been a growing Soviet nostalgia that has been most prominent in Russia and with older people.

==== Economy of the Eastern Bloc ====
The initial move for socialism was in 1963 after a Central Committee meeting, these countries became the Comecon countries. There were countries that chose to introduce the new economic system gradually (Bulgaria, East Germany and Poland) and countries that decided to first prepare theoretically, then experimentation at different levels and then in a large scale (Hungary and Romania). Czechoslovakia was set apart because the first stage of its transition consisted of economic recovery and then socialism was gradually implemented. Yugoslavia differed from other Eastern European countries in that after 1950 it modified its economic system by making self-management the base of enterprise activity. There were also a few differences between the economic model of the Soviet Union and Eastern European countries such as East Germany and Poland. Czechoslovakia and East Germany were administered along regional lines. Poland retained a centralized system similar to the Stalinist centralization of the Soviet Union. The Eastern European countries differed from the Soviet Union in that they had greater flexibility in the management of subordinate firms, the market was assigned a greater importance, accessible foreign trade and liberalization of the exchange of capital goods. There was also less bureaucracy than in the Soviet Union involved in the planning of the countries.

The Eastern Bloc countries achieved high rates of economic and technical progress, promoted industrialization and ensured steady growth rates of labor productivity and rises in the standard of living despite experiencing misdevelopment by central planners. During the 1950s–1960s, growth rates were high, progress was rapid by European standards and per capita growth within the Eastern European countries increased by 2.4 times the European average, accounting for 12.3 per cent of European production in 1950 and 14.4 in 1970, but most of their economies were stagnant by the late 1970s and 1980s as the system was resistant to change and did not easily adapt to new conditions. For political reasons, old factories were rarely closed, even when new technologies became available. Growth rates within the Eastern Bloc experienced relative decline after the 1970s. This has also been attributed to the 1970s energy crisis, including the 1973 oil crisis, the 1979 energy crisis and the 1980s oil glut, the post-war displacement of Keynesianism and the rise of neoliberalism and economic globalization. Countries such as China that did not isolate and instead reformed themselves thrived, but this did not happen in most Eastern Bloc countries as they depended upon the Soviet Union, especially for significant amounts of materials. From the end of the World War II to the mid-1970s, the economy of the Eastern Bloc steadily increased at the same rate as the economy in Western Europe, with the least none-reforming Stalinist nations of the Eastern Bloc having a stronger economy then the reformist-Stalinist states. While most Western European economies essentially began to approach the GDP per capita levels of the United States during the late 1970s and early 1980s, the Eastern Bloc countries did not, with per capita GDPs trailing significantly behind their comparable Western European counterparts.

Following the fall of the Eastern Bloc with the Revolutions of 1989, the economies of post-Soviet states quickly fell apart and took a long time to return to pre-1989 levels. Not only growth plummeted following the dissolution of the Soviet Union in December 1991, but also living standards declined, drug use, homelessness and poverty skyrocketed and suicides increased dramatically. Growth did not begin to return to pre-reform-era levels for approximately fifteen years. Some scholars have claimed that the Soviet model's industrialization and modernization laid the groundwork for their later economic growth, without which their current market-oriented economy may have not thrived or growth as much, or that it provided a better quality of life than market economies. The 1991 Soviet Union referendum (77% on an 80% turnout voted to preserve the Soviet Union and all Soviet republics voters voted in favor, with the Turkmenia Republic showing the most support at 98% and the lowest in the Russian Republic at 73%) has also been cited to argue that a vast majority of people did not want the Soviet Union dissolved, but rather more autonomy for the states within the union instead of a separation and the massive privatizations which had disastrous effects including giving rise to powerful oligarchs, especially in Russia and Ukraine. Mikhail Gorbachev, the last Soviet leader, supported Scandinavian social democracy in the form of the Nordic model. In light of those results, post-Soviet states have seen a growing nostalgia and a constant high number of people have expressed a longing for the Soviet period and its values since the dissolution of the Soviet Union, although the level of Soviet nostalgia varies across the former republics and certain groups of people may blend the Soviet and post-Soviet experience in their daily lives. Polls have also showed that a majority of post-Soviet states viewed the collapse of the Soviet Union negatively and felt that it could have been avoided. An even greater number would openly welcome a revival of the Soviet system. Nostalgia for the Soviet Union has appeared in the former Eastern Bloc, especially in eastern Germany, Poland, Romania and the former Yugoslavia.

The dissolution of the Soviet system was followed by a rapid increase in poverty, crime, corruption, unemployment, homelessness, rates of disease, infant mortality, domestic violence and income inequality, along with decreases in calorie intake, life expectancy, adult literacy and income. Many people in post-Soviet states felt that their lives were worse off after 1989, when capitalist markets were made dominant. Subsequent polls and qualitative research across post-Soviet states "confirmed these sentiments as popular discontent with the failed promises of free-market prosperity has grown, especially among older people".

==== Economy of China ====
The Maoist economic model of China was designed after the Stalinist principles of a centrally administrated command economy based on the Soviet model. In the common program set up by the Chinese People's Political Consultative Conference in 1949, in effect the country's interim constitution, state capitalism meant an economic system of corporatism. It provided the maxim "Whenever necessary and possible, private capital shall be encouraged to develop in the direction of state capitalism".

After the 20th Congress of the Communist Party of the Soviet Union, Mao Zedong condemned Stalinism and the flaws in the Marxist–Leninist movement that peaked with the Hungarian Uprising of 1956. This gave Mao space in which to experiment with departure from the Soviet socialist economy. The Maoist economic model was reliant on High Tide of Socialism in the Chinese Countryside, How to Handle Contradictions Among the People and Ten Great Relationships. Mao modeled the Chinese socialist economy in such a way that it led to the Great Leap Forward and the Commune Movement. In High Tide of Socialism in the Chinese Countryside, Mao focused on the industrialization and mechanization of the countryside. In How to Handle Contradictions Among the People, Mao wrote about his thoughts on the problems of socialist states as well as the conflicts of interest in the Chinese socialist society. In Ten Great Relationships, Mao wrote about his vision of China's economy.

The Maoist model had a dual economic goal, namely the industrialization of the countryside and the socialization of its people. It differed from the Soviet Union's goals in that Mao emphasized the class struggle against the bourgeoisie while the Soviet Union started advocating peaceful coexistence. China also allowed for more flexibility and experimentation than the Soviet Union and the countryside was at the center of its policies. Supporters argue that life expectancy greatly improved under Mao and that he rapidly industrialized China and laid the groundwork for the country's later rise to become an economic superpower while critics see many of Maoist economic policies as impediments to industrialization and modernization that delayed economic development and claim that China's economy underwent its rapid growth only after Maoist policies had been widely abandoned.

=== Economic challenges and legacy ===
The problem with the central planning of authoritarian socialist states is that as the state develops, it also grows in complexity and the possible errors grow and the possibilities of dis-allocations and waste of resources. As commented by Karl Marx, capitalism works because it is a system of economic force, but in socialist economics this force is insufficient to provide enough incentive. Human needs should be taken into account to make a socialist society function, but there is no necessary connection between the accumulation of capital and human satisfaction. Some of the issues that emerged during the socialist phase of Eastern Europe, the Soviet Union and Maoist China included inflation, lagged consumption, fixed prices, production structure and disproportionality.

There was a lag between when products were fabricated and when they were accessed to by the population, goods tended to stockpile. Yugoslavia raised its industrial prices by 17% and its agricultural prices by 32% from 1964 to 1965 while Czechoslovakia raised the prices of foodstuffs and services by 20% in 1966 and by 1967 prices were up by 30%. The production of consumer products also diminished in Yugoslavia, where the share of consumer products fell from 70% before World War II to 31% in 1965. Prices were fixed under the premise that it would force producers to behave more efficiently and as such the price-controlled products were produced in lower quantities. In Yugoslavia, the market distortion caused by the price fixing was realized and led to the un-freezing of prices in 1967. Hungary also had frozen prices and slowly unfroze them over a period of ten to fifteen years because otherwise the structural disproportions of the Hungarian economy would spin prices out of control. Many factories were kept running through government subsidies and protection despite any economic losses of the factories. This decreased overall efficiency of the socialist economies, increased the financial losses of those economies and caused them to have a disproportionate amount of available jobs and manpower. As argued by Ljubo Sirc, the "Soviet Union and other communist countries have the worst of both worlds: some enterprises or operations are inefficient because they are too capital-intensive, other enterprises or operations because they are too labour-intensive".

The Stalinist economic model in which the socialist economies were based did not allow for a decrease in growth rates. It did not allow for the flexibility needed to keep up with growing economies. According to Paul Roderick Gregory, the collapse of the Soviet Union was due to the inherent drawbacks of the administrative-command system, namely poor planning, low expertise of planners, unreliable supply lines, conflict between planners and producers and the dictatorial chain of command. According to Gregory, "the system was managed by thousands of 'Stalins' in a nested dictatorship". Once the enterprises gained some freedom during perestroika, the rigid administrative-command system imploded. Despite these shortcomings, the Soviet Union's growth in GDP per capita compared favorably with Western Europe. It has also been noted that such states compared favorably with Western states in some health indicators such as infant mortality and life expectancy, making some significant gains and that "one thought [...] bound to occur is that communism is good for poverty removal". A lasting legacy of the Soviet Union remains physical infrastructure created during decades of policies geared towards the construction of heavy industry and widespread environmental destruction. Under the Soviet system, income, property and social equality was radically increased. Income inequality in Russia dropped, then rebounded after the demise of the Soviet Union in 1991. Similarly, income inequality also dropped rapidly in the Eastern Bloc and after Eastern Europe went under the Soviet sphere of influence at the end of World War II. After the collapse of the Soviet system, economic and social inequality went back up.

The breakdown of economic ties that followed the collapse of the Soviet Union led to a severe economic crisis and catastrophic fall in living standards in post-Soviet states and the former Eastern Bloc which was even worse than the Great Depression. Poverty and economic inequality surged between 1988–1989 and 1993–1995, with the Gini ratio increasing by an average of 9 points for all former socialist states. Even before Russia's financial crisis in 1998, Russia's GDP was half of what it had been in the early 1990s. In the decades following the end of the Cold War, only five or six of the post-communist states are on a path to joining the wealthy capitalist West while most are falling behind, some to such an extent that it will take over 50 years to catch up to where they were before the end of the Soviet system. In a 2001 study by economist Steven Rosefielde, he calculated that there were 3.4 million premature deaths in Russia from 1990 to 1998, partly blaming on the "shock therapy" that came with the Washington Consensus.

According to Klas-Göran Karlsson, discussion of the number of victims of authoritarian socialist regimes has been "extremely extensive and ideologically biased". Any attempt to estimate a total number of killings under authoritarian socialist regimes depends greatly on definitions, ranging from a low of 10–20 millions to as high as 110 millions. The criticism of some of the estimates are mostly focused on three aspects, namely that the estimates were based on sparse and incomplete data when significant errors are inevitable; that the figures were skewed to higher possible values; and that those dying at war and victims of civil wars, Holodomor and other famines under authoritarian socialist governments should not be counted. Critics also argue that neoliberal policies of liberalization, deregulation and privatisation "had catastrophic effects on former Soviet Bloc countries" and that the imposition of Washington Consensus-inspired "shock therapy" had little to do with future economic growth. It has been argued that the establishment of welfare states in the West in the early 20th century could be partly a reaction by elites to the Bolshevik Revolution and its violence against the bourgeoisie which feared violent revolution in its own backyard. The welfare states gave rise to the post-war consensus and the post-war economic boom, where the United States, the Soviet Union and Western European and East Asian countries in particular experienced unusually high and sustained economic growth, together with full employment. Contrary to early predictions, this high growth also included many countries that had been devastated by the war such as Japan (Japanese post-war economic miracle), West Germany and Austria (Wirtschaftswunder), South Korea (Miracle of the Han River), France (Trente Glorieuses), Italy (Italian economic miracle) and Greece (Greek economic miracle). Similarly, Michael Parenti holds that the Soviet model played a role in "tempering the worst impulses of Western capitalism and imperialism" and that Western business interests are "no longer restrained by a competing system" in the post-Cold War era and are now "rolling back the many gains that working people in the West have won over the years". For Parenti, there were clear differences between fascist and socialist regimes as the latter "made dramatic gains in literacy, industrial wages, health care and women's rights" and in general "created a life for the mass of people that was far better than the wretched existence they had endured under feudal lords, military bosses, foreign colonizers and Western capitalists".

Other have criticized the linking of all leftist and socialist ideals to the excesses of Stalinism by the elites in the West in hope to discredit and marginalize all political ideologies that could "threaten the primacy of private property and free markets", emphasising Stalin and other socialist leaders' crimes and neglecting legitimate achievements such as education, literacy, the modernisation of the economy, social security, the rise in the standard of living and women's rights. Similarly, it has been argued that there is a double standard in emphasising famines, labour camps, mass killings and purges under socialist regimes in a death toll body count, but not applying the same standard to capitalist, colonial-imperial regimes. The collapse of the Soviet system, the Soviet Union in particular, is seen as the proof that communism and socialism can not work, allowing for all left-wing criticism of the excesses of neoliberal capitalism to be silenced, for the alternatives will supposedly inevitably result in economic inefficiency and violent authoritarianism. Some Western academics argue that anti-communist narratives have exaggerated the extent of political repression and censorship in states under authoritarian socialist rule, or that those states provided human rights such as economic, social and cultural rights not found under capitalist states.

== Development ==
Authoritarian socialism is best understood through an examination of its developmental history, allowing for the analysis and comparison of its various global examples. Although authoritarian socialism was by no means restricted to the Soviet Union, its ideological development occurred in tandem with the Stalinist regimes. As the Soviet Union was a developmental model for many socialist states in the post-World War II era, Soviet authoritarian socialism was adopted by a diverse range of states and continued to develop well into the 20th century in the Middle East and North African regions. Those regions, characterized by authoritarian traits such as uncontested party leadership, restricted civil liberties and strong unelected officials with non-democratic influence on policy, share many commonalities with the Soviet Union.

Authoritarian socialist states were ideologically Marxist–Leninist (the state ideology of the Soviet Union that arose in Imperial Russia within the Bolshevik faction of the Russian Social Democratic Labour Party) or one of its variants such as Maoism, among other national variants and updating, following the Soviet developmental model. While those socialist states saw themselves as a form of democracy opposed to that of Western states and claimed to be workers and peasants' states or people's democratic republics, they are considered to be authoritarian because they featured external controls such as violent repression and forms of artificial socialization.

The implementation of authoritarian forms of socialism was accomplished with a dogmatized ideology reinforced by terror and violence. The combination of those external controls served to implement a normality within an authoritarian country that seemed like illusion or madness to someone removed from its political atmosphere. For many authoritarian socialist countries, their regimes were a mix of this form of external control-based totalitarianism (for intellectually and ideologically active members of society) and traditional or cultural authoritarianism (for the majority of the population).

With the fall of the Soviet Union and that of the Eastern Bloc, most former authoritarian socialist regimes reformed themselves. Some of those in Eastern Europe underwent shock doctrine and moved into a free-market capitalist and liberal-democratic direction, although some of them such as Hungary or Russia are described as illiberal democracies and others as hybrid regimes. In Africa, many ruling parties retained power and moved into a democratic socialist or social-democratic direction while others moved into liberal-democratic multi-party politics. Other countries such as Cuba and Vietnam followed the Chinese development in applying economic reforms while maintaining centralised political control. They also include Chinese allies such as the Philippines and Thailand, who were not authoritarian socialist regimes, but are now favouring the Beijing Consensus over the Washington Consensus followed by Eastern European countries. Rather than moving in the direction of democratic capitalism followed by the majority of Eastern European countries, China and its allies, including Hungary, Nicaragua, Russia, Singapore, Turkey and Venezuela, are described as authoritarian capitalist regimes.

=== Soviet Union ===
Despite the Marxian basis of Vladimir Lenin's socialism, the realities of his system were in direct opposition to Karl Marx's belief in the emancipation and autonomy of the working class. Those contradictions stemmed primarily from Lenin's implementation of a vanguard or regimented party of committed revolutionaries "who knew exactly what history's mandate was and who were prepared to be its self-ordained custodians". The function of this party was meant to be primarily transitional, given that Lenin believed that the working class was politically unprepared for rule and Russia was not yet industrially poised for socialism.

Lenin adopted state-capitalist policies. On seeing the Soviet Union's growing coercive power in 1923, a dying Lenin said Russia had reverted to "a bourgeois tsarist machine [...] barely varnished with socialism". Marx coined the term barracks communism (German: Kasernenkommunismus) to refer to a form of authoritarian socialism in which all aspects of life are bureaucratically regimented and communal. Originally, Marx used the expression to criticize the vision of Sergey Nechayev outlined in The Fundamentals of the Future Social System which had a major influence on other Russian revolutionaries like Lenin and others such as Pyotr Tkachev. The term itself did not refer to military barracks, but rather to the workers' barracks-type primitive dormitories in which industrial workers lived in many places in the Russian Empire of the time. Political theorists of the Soviet Union later applied the term to China under Mao Zedong. During the later perestroika period, it was applied to the history of the Soviet Union.

Unlike Stalin, who first claimed to have achieved socialism with the Soviet Constitution of 1936 and then confirmed it in the Economic Problems of Socialism in the USSR, Lenin did not call the Soviet Union a socialist state, nor did he claim that it had achieved socialism. While Stalin's colleagues described him as Asiatic and Stalin himself told a Japanese journalist that "I am not a European man, but an Asian, a Russified Georgian", Lenin identified ethnically as Russian, believed that other European countries, especially Germany, were culturally superior to Russia which he described as "one of the most benighted, medieval and shamefully backward of Asian countries". From his youth, Lenin had wanted Russia to become more culturally European and Western.

In his testament, Lenin grow concerned about the rise of the bureaucracy and proposed changes to the structure of the Soviet governing bodies. He also made criticism of several Bolshevik leaders, including Stalin and Leon Trotsky, warning of the possibility of a split developing in the party leadership between Trotsky and Stalin if proper measures were not taken to prevent it. In a post-script, Lenin suggested Stalin be removed from his position as General Secretary of the Russian Communist Party's Central Committee. Isaac Deutscher, a biographer of both Trotsky and Stalin, argued that "[t]he whole testament breathed uncertainty". Leninist socialists remain divided in their views on Stalin. Some view him as Lenin's authentic successor while others believe he betrayed Lenin's ideas by deviating from them. The socio-economic nature of Stalin's Soviet Union has also been much debated, varyingly being labelled a form of bureaucratic collectivism, state capitalism, state socialism or a totally unique mode of production.

==== Vladimir Lenin ====
Marx chronicled a history of development through a capitalist age of industrialization that resulted in the manipulation of the working class. This development culminated in the empowerment of a proletariat which could benefit from the fruits of industrialization without being exploited. Although he meant his ideology to appeal to the disenfranchised working class of an industrialized society, it was widely accepted by developing countries that had yet to successfully industrialize. This resulted in stagnant economies and socialist states without the necessary organization and structure to industrialize. Seeing the failure of those models, Lenin concluded that socialism in Russia had to be constructed from above through party dictatorship that appealed to both the working class and peasants. Because the working class accounted for only 15% of the population, Lenin was forced to appeal to the much greater peasant class (accounting for nearly 80%) to propel the Bolshevik faction of Russian Social Democratic Labour Party that under Lenin eventually became the Russian Communist Party (Bolsheviks) due to a split within social democracy. The Bolsheviks promised "Bread, Peace, and Land" to the peasants and delivered, redistributing land from the landlords and increasing the number of farms in Russia from 427,000 in 1917 to 463,000 in 1919.

For some, Lenin's legacy was one of violent terror and concentration of power in the hands of few. Lenin intentionally employed violence as a means to manipulate the population and tolerated absolutely no opposition, arguing that it was "a great deal better to 'discuss with rifles' than with the theses of the opposition". He worked for the ideological destruction of society as a whole so that it could easily adopt the rhetoric and political ideals of the ruling party. Lenin's use of terror (instilled by a secret police apparatus) to exact social obedience, mass murder and disappearance, censoring of communications and absence of justice was only reinforced by his successor Joseph Stalin. In contrast to those who support this thesis, others have disputed this characterization and separated Lenin from Stalin and Leninism from Stalinism. A controversial figure, Lenin remains both reviled and revered, a figure who has been both idolised and demonised. This has extended into academic studies of Lenin and Leninism which have often been polarised along political lines. While there have been both sympathetic and expressly hostile Lenin's biographies, some sought to avoid making either hostile or positive comments about Lenin, thereby evading politicized stereotypes. Some Marxist activists, who defend both the October Revolution and soviet democracy, emphasise how the Bolsheviks wanted to avoid terror and argue that the Red Terror was born in response to the White Terror which has been downplayed.

Lenin has been variously described as "the century's most significant political leader", "one of the undeniably outstanding figures of modern history" and one of the 20th century's "principal actors" as well as "one of the most widespread, universally recognizable icons of the twentieth century" and "one of the most significant and influential figures of modern history". Some historians have characterized Lenin's administration as totalitarian or a police state; or they have described it as a one-party dictatorship, with Lenin as its dictator, although noting differences between Lenin and Stalin in that under the first there was a dictatorship of the party and under the latter that of one man. Others have argued against the view that Lenin's government was a dictatorship, viewing it as an imperfect way of preserving elements of democracy without some of the processes found in liberal democratic states. According to the latter view, "the personal qualities that led Lenin to brutal policies were not necessarily any stronger than in some of the major Western leaders of the twentieth century".

Among sympathisers, Lenin was portrayed as having made a genuine adjustment of Marxist theory that enabled it to suit Russia's particular socio-economic conditions. The Soviet view characterised him as a man who recognised the historically inevitable and accordingly helped to make the inevitable happen. Conversely, the majority of Western historians have perceived him as a person who manipulated events in order to attain and then retain political power, moreover considering his ideas as attempts to ideologically justify his pragmatic policies. More recently, revisionists in both Russia and the West have highlighted the impact that pre-existing ideas and popular pressures exerted on Lenin and his policies.

==== Joseph Stalin ====
Stalin sought to rapidly industrialize the Soviet Union, but perhaps in a way that was unrealistic, given the aggregate skill level and capital of the population and Stalin's argument that the Soviet Union had to accomplish in a decade what England had taken centuries to do in terms of economic development in order to be prepared for an invasion from the West. Acknowledging this inadequacy, Stalin ordered that resources slotted for consumption be redirected to production or exported as a temporary sacrifice on the part of the population for the sake of rapid growth. The model was successful initially, with ideology and nationalism promoting morale despite shortages in resources such as food and construction materials for housing. Presumably, the exploited classes believed that once the rapid and successful industrialization of Russia had taken place, power would be relinquished by the vanguard party and communism would ensue. However, Stalin continued to demand even more far-reaching sacrifices. Because of his control over both political and economic arenas which historians argue gave his vanguard party an amount of control surpassing that of Russia's tzars or emperors, citizens were unwilling to challenge his decrees, given that aspects of their lives such as medical care, housing and social freedoms could be restricted according to the discretion of the party.

Despite failures, Stalin's expectations remained uncontested by the working class and the model was adopted by a multitude of emerging socialist states during that era. The Soviet attempt to collectivize agriculture, transforming the Soviet Union from one of the world's largest exporters of grain to the world's largest importer of grain, was widely replicated despite its failure. Many historians claim that extermination was the fate of a wide variety of people during Stalin's regime such as political opponents, ideological rivals, suspect party members, accused military officers, kulaks, lower-class families, former members of the societal elites, ethnic groups, religious groups and the relatives and sympathizers of these offenders. Those deaths occurred as a result of collectivization, famine, terror campaigns, disease, war and mortality rates in the Gulag. As the majority of excess deaths under Stalin were not direct killings, the exact number of victims of Stalinism is difficult to calculate due to lack of consensus among scholars on which deaths can be attributed to Stalin. However, it is far lower than the estimates of 20 million or above which were made before access to the archives. Regarding the Holodomor, part of the greater Soviet famine of 1932–1933, the consensus argues that while Stalin's policies contributed significantly to the high mortality rate, it rejects the view that Stalin or the Soviet government consciously engineered the famine. It has been argued that Stalin's "purposive killings" fit more closely into the category of "execution" rather than "murder", given he thought the accused were indeed guilty of crimes against the state and insisted on documentation.

Among the anti-Stalinist left and anti-communist Russians and Westerners, Stalin's legacy is largely negative, with the Soviet Union under him characterised as a totalitarian state and Stalin as its authoritarian leader. Various biographers have described Stalin as a dictator, an autocrat, an Oriental despot, or accused him of practicing Caesarism. A man who "perhaps [...] determined the course of the twentieth century" more than any other individual, described as "one of the most notorious figures in history" and possessing "that rare combination: both 'intellectual' and killer", the "ultimate politician" and the "most elusive and fascinating of the twentieth-century titans" as well as "one of the most powerful figures in human history", Stalin initially ruled as part of the party oligarchy which he turned into a personal dictatorship in 1934 and became absolute dictator between March and June 1937. Stalin later built a "personal dictatorship within the Bolshevik dictatorship", concentrated an "unprecedented political authority in his hands" and has been described as "closer to personal despotism than almost any monarch in history". Others argued that the campaigns of terror organized by Stalin were driven by his fear of counter-revolution.

Other historians and scholars cautioned against "over-simplistic stereotypes" that portrayed Stalin as an omnipotent and omnipresent tyrant who controlled every aspect of Soviet life through repression and totalitarianism, noting that "powerful though he was, his powers were not limitless" and that Stalin's rule depended on his willingness to conserve the Soviet structure he had inherited. It has been observed that Stalin's ability to remain in power relied on him having a majority in the Politburo at all times. It was noted that at various points, especially in his later years, there were "periodic manifestations" in which the party oligarchy threatened his autocratic control. Stalin denied to foreign visitors that he was a dictator, stating that those who labelled him as such did not understand the Soviet governance structure. Several historians have criticized the totalitarian twins concept and comparisons between communism/socialism and fascism or Stalinism and Nazism as Cold War concepts that focus upon the upper levels of society and which use have obscured the reality of the system. Others further noted how the concept became prominent in Western anti-communist political discourse during the Cold War era as a tool to convert pre-war anti-fascism into post-war anti-communism.

With the collapse of the Soviet Union and the release of the archives, some of the heat has gone out of the debate and politicization has been reduced. It has been argued that the Soviet political system was not completely controlled from the center and that both Lenin and Stalin only responded to political events as they arose. Some also questioned the previously published findings that Stalin organized himself the murder of Sergey Kirov to justify his campaign of Great Terror. Others stated that mass deaths from famines are not a "uniquely Stalinist evil" and compared the behavior of the Stalinist regime vis-à-vis the Holodomor to that of the British Empire (towards Ireland and India) and even the G8 in contemporary times, arguing that the latter "are guilty of mass manslaughter or mass deaths from criminal negligence because of their not taking obvious measures to reduce mass deaths" and that a possible defense of Stalin and his associates is that "their behaviour was no worse than that of many rulers in the nineteenth and twentieth centuries". Despite the criticism, Stalin has been considered an outstanding and exceptional politician as well as a great statesman and state-builder, with some suggesting that without Stalin the Soviet Union might have collapsed long before 1991 as he strengthened and stabilized the country. In under three decades, Stalin transformed the Soviet Union into a major industrial world power, one which could "claim impressive achievements" in terms of urbanisation, military strength, education and Soviet pride. Under his rule, the average Soviet life expectancy grew due to improved living conditions, nutrition and medical care as mortality rates also declined.

Although millions of Soviet citizens despised him, support for Stalin was nevertheless widespread throughout Soviet society. Citing those achievements and highlighting crimes committed by the Western world and its leaders during the colonization and imperialist period as well as war crimes and crimes against humanity committed in the 20th century whilst arguing that Stalin's hatred came mainly from General Secretary Nikita Khrushchev's Secret Speech read during the 20th Congress of the Communist Party of the Soviet Union in February 1956, some have attempted to rehabilitate Stalin and its legacy, or otherwise gave a more neutral and nuanced view. However, those attempts have been criticized and most of its authors labelled as neo-Stalinists. In the 21st century, more than half of Russians view Stalin positively and many support restoration of his monuments either dismantled by leaders or destroyed by rioting Russians during the dissolution of the Soviet Union. Stalin's popularity has tripled among Russians in the last twenty years and the trend accelerated since Vladimir Putin, who has been described as holding neo-Soviet views, has come to power.

=== China ===
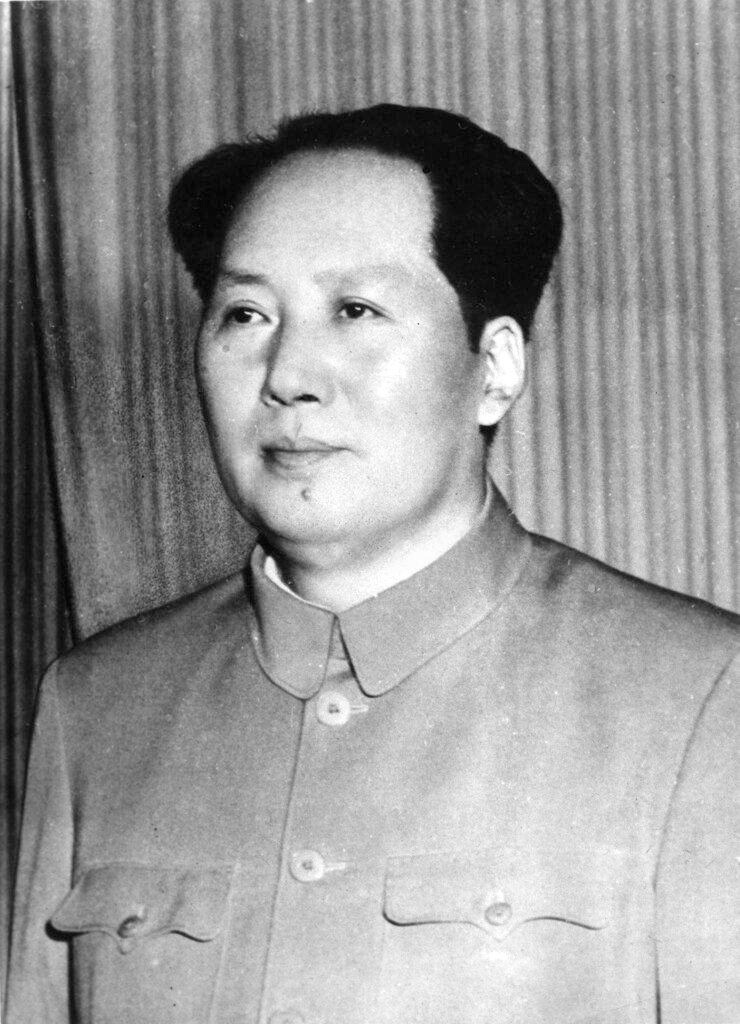
Mao Zedong

Following the fall of the elite, land-owning class of the early 20th century, China began its Communist Revolution through the countryside. As relationships between agrarian masses and state-controlled programs splintered, the Chinese Communist Party led by Mao Zedong began seizing power. In his 1949 essay On People's Democratic Dictatorship, Mao committed himself and the Chinese state to the creation of a strong state power with increased economic control. He stressed the importance of an authoritarian state, where political order and unity could be established and maintained. Mao committed himself to unification in the vein of complete system overthrow. As party chairman, Mao allowed himself complete control over the structure and execution of the party with his own cult of personality, an almost mythical position as a guardian of wisdom and charisma.

With such power, Mao was able to influence popular opinions, allowing his agenda support without going through state-controlled measures. During the Great Leap Forward, an initiative to develop China from an agrarian sector a major industrial powerhouse, Mao relied greatly on his prestige to influence the people. However, the Great Leap Forward proved a failure as widespread crop and irrigation failures led to the 1959–1961 Great Chinese Famine. There was no suggested end to the revolution—it was meant to be a continuing process of empowerment of the peasant class. With the aggressive failure of his Cultural Revolution, Chinese support for the party and for Mao waned. Continuing struggles after his death would undermine his socialist system, allowing a more democratic yet still one-party ruled system to continue into today. As there is little agreement over his legacy both in China and abroad, Mao is a controversial figure who has been regarded as one of the most important and influential individuals in modern world history.

Supporters credit Mao with driving imperialism out of China, modernizing the nation and building it into a world power, promoting the status of women and improving education and health care as well as increasing life expectancy as China's population grew from around 550 million to over 900 million under his leadership, among other achievements. Conversely, his regime has been called autocratic and totalitarian and condemned for bringing about mass repression and destroying religious and cultural artifacts and sites. It was additionally responsible for vast numbers of deaths, with estimates ranging from 30 to 70 million victims through starvation, prison labour and mass executions. While some critics argue that Mao was dismissive of the suffering and death caused by his policies, or that he was well aware that his policies would be responsible for the deaths of millions, others have disputed this.

Praised as a political intellect, theorist, military strategist, poet and visionary, Mao has been variously described as a "great historical criminal", "both monster and a genius", who was also "a great force for good", a "great leader in history" and a "great criminal" as well as "one of the great tyrants of the twentieth century", comparable to Adolf Hitler and Joseph Stalin, with a death toll surpassing both. However, others reject those comparisons, arguing that whereas the deaths caused by Nazi Germany and the Soviet Union were largely systematic and deliberate, the overwhelming majority of the deaths under Mao were unintended consequences of famine, noting that the landlord class was not exterminated as a people due to his belief in redemption through thought reform. Mao has been compared to 19th-century Chinese reformers who challenged China's traditional beliefs in the era of China's clashes with Western colonial powers as well as to United States President Andrew Jackson.

Similarly, Maoist economics policies are controversial. Supporters argue that life expectancy greatly improved under Mao and that such policies rapidly industrialized China and laid the groundwork for the country's later rise to become an economic superpower. Critics argue that policies such as the Great Leap Forward and the Cultural Revolution were impediments to industrialization and modernization that delayed economic development and claim that China's economy underwent its rapid growth only after Maoist policies had been widely abandoned. All in all, both supporters and critics alike generally agree that the human cost has been staggering.

==== Maoism ====
Maoism is an adapted Sino-centric version of Marxism–Leninism. While believing in democratic centralism, where party decisions are brought about by scrutiny and debate and then are binding upon all members of the party once implemented, Mao did not accept dissenters to the party's decisions. Through the Cultural Revolution and the Campaign to Suppress Counterrevolutionaries, Mao attempted to purge any subversive idea—especially capitalist or Western threat—with heavy force, justifying his actions as the necessary way for the central authority to keep power.

At the same time, Mao emphasized the importance of cultural heritage and individual choice as a way of creating this national unity. He described his ideal system as "a political situation in which there is both centralism and democracy, both discipline and freedom, both unity of purpose and personal ease of mind and liveliness to facilitate the socialist revolution". While the system advocates contradiction, Mao believed the state above all could provide the masses with the tools for their own expression, but his own brand of self-expression was wholly manufactured, built largely on replacing traditional practices and artifacts of Chinese culture with his own. Through this, transformation of the people towards an internal party collectiveness was possible.

Notably, Mao's authoritarianism was rooted in a collective bottom-up style of empowerment. In his system, the proletariat and peasantry were responsible for rising up against the bureaucracy and capital of the state. Joining the peasant class with the bourgeoisie of the countryside (the land-holding, local farmers), the group was able to stifle the claims to power by the wealthier, urban landowners through the banner of communism. Only when this collection of peasants and petty bourgeoisie existed could Mao grow his own, custom bureaucracy. Once this unity was established, Mao argued that the people were the ones who could control the state, but his government's intense control over the citizenry emphasizes the contradiction in his theory—a contradiction, he maintained, was a necessary reality of their specialized system.

==== Post-Maoism ====
Following the Chinese economic reforms in the 1980s by Deng Xiaoping, most then current and former authoritarian socialist regimes have followed the Chinese model while only leaders such as Kim Jong-il maintained their orthodox views. Countries such as Vietnam (socialist-oriented market economy) and more recently Cuba have followed the Chinese socialist market economy. With the Great Recession, the Washington Consensus has been losing favour to the Beijing Consensus. According to Joshua Kurlantzick, the Chinese model "offer a viable alternative to the leading democracies. In many ways, their systems pose the most serious challenge to democratic capitalism since the rise of communism and fascism in the 1920s and early 1930s".

While arguing that "the 'China model' has become shorthand for economic liberalization without political liberalization", Kurlantzick cautiones that "China's model of development is actually more complex. It builds on earlier, state-centered Asian models of development such as in South Korea and Taiwan, while taking uniquely Chinese steps designed to ensure that the Communist Party remains central to economic and political policy-making". Kurlantzick argues that "the Beijing government maintains a high degree of control over the economy, but it is hardly returning to socialism". China developed "a hybrid form of capitalism in which it has opened its economy to some extent, but it also ensures the government controls strategic industries, picks corporate winners, determines investments by state funds, and pushes the banking sector to support national champion firms". Although noting that "China privatized many state firms" in the 1980s and 1990s, he states that "the central government still controls roughly 120 companies. [...] Working through these networks, the Beijing leadership sets state priorities, gives signals to companies, and determines corporate agendas, but does so without the direct hand of the state appearing in public".

According to Kurlantzick, "government intervention in business is utilized, in a way not possible in a free-market democracy, to strengthen the power of the ruling regime and China's position internationally. [...] In short, the China model sees commerce as a means to promote national interests, and not just to empower (and potentially to make wealthy) individuals. And for over three decades, China's model of development has delivered staggering successes". Along with India, China is providing "virtually the only growth in the whole global economy" and in about thirty years the country has gone from a poor, mostly agrarian nation to the second-largest economy in the world.

=== Arab world ===
Socialism was introduced into the Middle East in the form of populist policies designed to galvanize the working class into overthrowing colonial powers and their domestic allies. These policies were held by authoritarian states interested in the rapid industrialisation and social equalisation of Arab nations and often were characterised by redistributive or protectionist economic policies, lower class mobilization, charismatic leaders and promises to improve national living standards. Those states were progressive in terms of the colonial development that had occurred thus far. They allowed important political and economic gains to be made by workers, encouraged land redistribution, unseated oligarchical political powers and implemented import-substituting industrialisation development strategies.

With the collapse of the Eastern Bloc following the Revolutions of 1989 and the dissolution of the Soviet Union in December 1991 as well as the push for democratization, many Arab states have moved toward a model of fiscal discipline proposed by the Washington Consensus. Although authoritarian leaders of those states implemented democratic institutions during the 1980s and 1990s, their multi-party elections created an arena in which business elites could lobby for personal interests while largely silencing the lower class. Economic liberalisation in these regions yielded economies that led to regimes built on the support of rent-seeking urban elites, with political opposition inviting the prospect of political marginalisation and even retaliation. Academics and political scientists have classified Ba'athist Syria as an Arab government that is based on the cold war era model of authoritarian socialism. (Note: Sources:)

While some Trotskyists such as the Committee for a Workers' International have included Ba'athist Syria as an authoritarian socialist state when they have had a nationalized economy as deformed workers' states, other socialists argued that the neo-Ba'athists promoted capitalists from within the party and outside their countries.

==== Resistance to democratisation ====
Arab world

A great deal of debate has been paid by the field of comparative politics to how the Arab region was able to avoid the third wave of democratisation. A number of arguments have been offered by professionals in the field, ranging from a discussion of prerequisites for democratisation not supported by the Arab culture to a lack of democratic actors initiating the necessary democratic transition.

Marsha Pripstein Posusney argues that the "patriarchal and tribal mentality of the culture is an impediment to the development of pluralist values", rendering Arab citizens prone to accept patriarchal leaders and lacking the national unity that many argue is necessary for democratization to be successful. Eva Bellin concedes that the prevalence of Islam is a distinguishing factor of the region and therefore must contribute to the region's exceptionalism, "given Islam's presumed inhospitality to democracy". Posusney argues that this "intrinsic incompatibility between democracy and Islam" remains unproven given that efforts to test this association quantitatively have failed to produce conclusive results. Ethnic divisions in the area have also been cited as a factor as well as a weak civil society, a state-controlled economy, poverty, low literacy rates and inequality.

In his book Debating Arab Authoritarianism: Dynamics and Durability in Nondemocratic Regimes, Oliver Schlumberger has argued that there is in fact an international ambivalence toward authoritarianism in the Middle East given that stability is preferred over the uncertainty of democratisation due to the region's oil and gas supplies and the strategic importance of its geopolitical location.

=== Africa ===
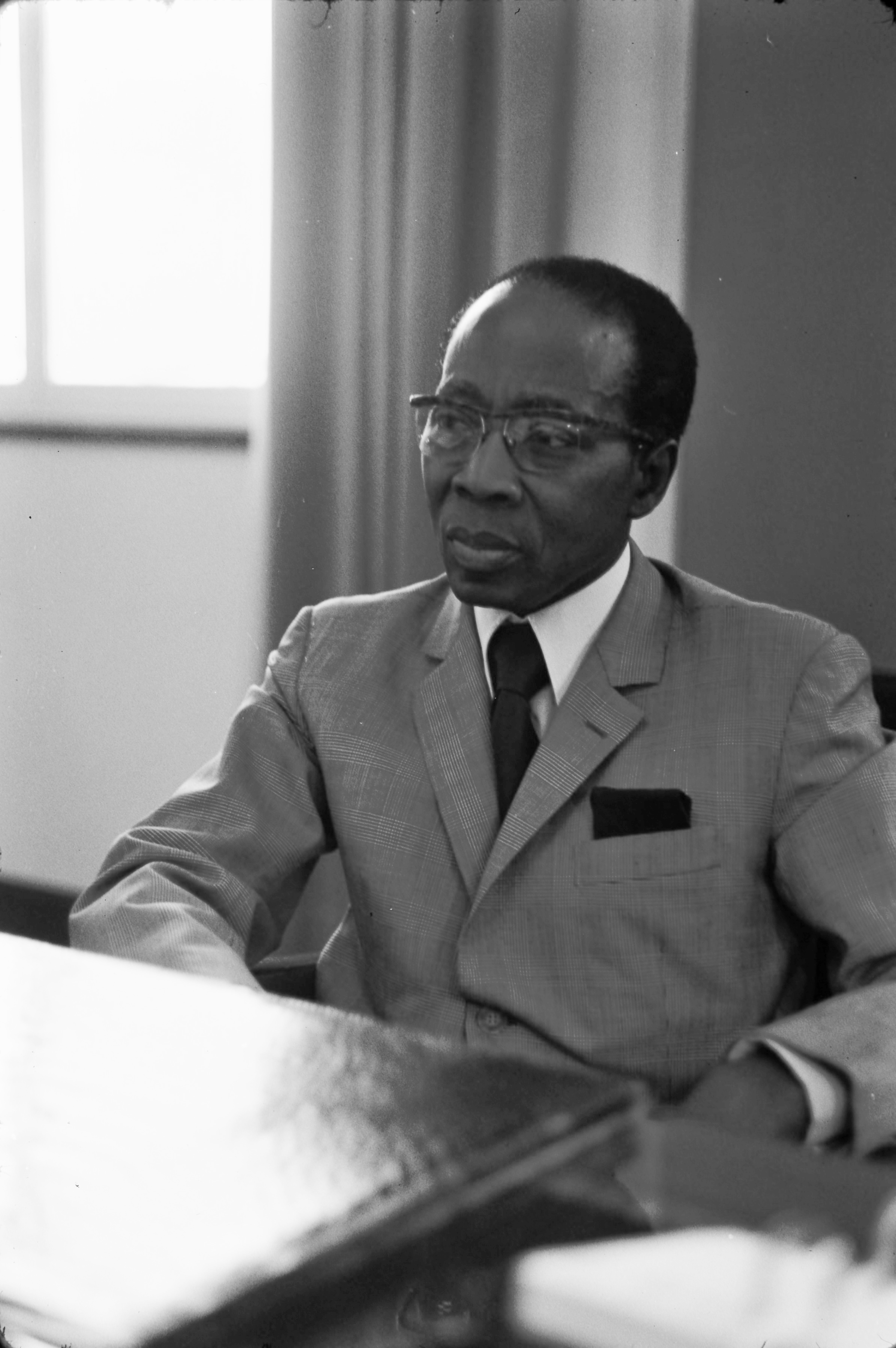
Léopold Sédar Senghor

During the 1945 Pan-African Conference, calls for increased organization, development and self-determination in the poverty stricken African continent put the impetus on colonial powers to negotiate national sovereignty. While there were few Marxist movements into the continent, Soviet Union activity spurred anti-imperialist and globalization movements from African countries. The congress established national liberation as the main topic of their sessions, emphasizing the elimination and exploitation by the imperialist powers over authentic national sovereignty. However, they did not establish clear social or political parameters for this new liberation.

African leaders consistently viewed socialism as a direct rejection of the colonial system and in turn dismissed the notion of creating independent capitalist systems throughout the continent. They attempted to infuse various forms of socialism—some Marxist–Leninist, others democratic—into tailored ideologies specific to each country. Once these systems were in place, countries developed towards a "focal institutional" society. According to sociologist William Friedland, societies adopted a totalitarian vision of rule, allowing one-party systems and institutions to "penetrate every sphere of private or public activity".

==== Senegal ====
Senegalese President Leopold Sedar Senghor was among the first and most vocal African advocates for socialism. Before being elected president, Senghor served as one of nine African delegates to the 1945 French Constituent Assembly, negotiating for the transfer of self-governing and policy-making power through locally elected councils. The measure shortly failed, keeping autonomy from the colonies until the independence movements of the 1960s.

After Senegalese independence in 1960, Senghor's Union Progresiste Senegalaise, a derivative of the French Socialist Party, grew massive support throughout the continent. Much of his party's success hinged on his revisionist version of Marxism–Leninism, where he argued that "the major contradiction of Marxism is that it presents itself as a science, whereas, despite its denials, it is based on an ethic". By framing it as an ethic, Senghor was able to remove the strict determinism from the ideology, allowing it to be molded towards an Afro-centric model. His revision proved similar to that of Benito Mussolini as he called on a national movement from and for his one-party-ruled government, arguing: "In a word, we must awaken the National Consciousness. [...] But the government cannot and must not do it all. It must be helped by the party. [...] Our party must be the consciousness of the masses".

==== Ghana ====
In the same vein as Senghor, socialist leader Kwame Nkrumah sought to advance this one-party, nationalized form of socialist obedience. Nkrumah stressed the importance of government-owned property and resources. He maintained that "production for private profit deprives a large section of the people of the goods and services produced", advocating public ownership to fit the "people's needs". To accomplish this, Nkrumah emphasized the importance of discipline and obedience towards the single socialist party. He argued that if people submitted and accepted the singular party's program, political independence would be possible. By 1965, his one-party rule had produced an Assembly entirely made up of his own party members.

Nkrumah saw law as a malleable weapon of political power, not as a product of a complex system of political institutions. Ghanaian power structures were dominated and controlled by his hand, but elite landowners questioned the legitimacy of Nkrumah's power. Those elites were only afforded one choice, namely to align with their government if they wanted access to the state. Gradually, those who were not granted or did not desire entrance into the party created regions blocs. The Asante emerged as a regional force capable political sway. With the power to set the agenda, the authoritarian party often clashed with these emerging regional groups, ultimately undermining the one-party system.

==== Tanzania ====
Julius Nyerere attempted to socialist reform for Tanzania following those in Ghana and Senegal. The tenets of his initiatives were to promote the Tanzanian economy; secure state control over development; create a sole political party called the Tanganyika African National Union (TANU) which would be under his control; and share the benefits of all gathered income.

The system—called ujaama—became a tool for nationalization of the Tanzanian people. In the system, all Tanzanains were encouraged to run for office, with no campaign funding allowed. Speeches in the election would not focus on the national issues, but rather on the quality of the individual, each of whom would be closely controlled by TANU. Structurally, the power was shared along regional boundaries, giving increased policy making power and resource allocation to these regions. Local institutions were downplayed, with leadership organizations often facing subversion from higher governmental structures.

The first wave of elections in the Tanzanian general election produced a 100% voting rate for TANU officials.

=== Latin America ===
Socialism of the 21st century is an interpretation of socialist principles first advocated by German sociologist and political analyst Heinz Dieterich and taken up by a number of Latin American leaders. Dieterich argued in 1996 that both free-market industrial capitalism and 20th-century authoritarian socialism have failed to solve urgent problems of humanity like poverty, hunger, exploitation, economic oppression, sexism, racism, the destruction of natural resources and the absence of a truly participatory democracy. While having democratic socialist elements, it primarily resembles Marxist revisionism. Leaders who have advocated for this form of socialism include Hugo Chávez of Venezuela, Néstor Kirchner of Argentina, Rafael Correa of Ecuador, Evo Morales of Bolivia and Luiz Inácio Lula da Silva of Brazil. Because of the local unique historical conditions, it is often contrasted with previous applications of socialism in other countries, with a major difference being the effort towards a more decentralised and participatory planning process.

Critics claim that this form of socialism in Latin America acts as a façade for authoritarianism. The charisma of figures like Hugo Chávez and mottoes such as "Country, Socialism, or Death!" have drawn comparisons to the Latin American dictators and caudillos of the past. According to Steven Levitsky, only under "the dictatorships of the past [...] were presidents reelected for life", with Levitsky further stating that while Latin America experienced democracy, citizens opposed "indefinite reelection, because of the dictatorships of the past". Levitsky then noted how in Ecuador, Nicaragua and Venezuela "reelection is associated with the same problems of 100 years ago".

In 2014, The Washington Post also argued that "Bolivia's Evo Morales, David Ortega of Nicaragua and the late Venezuelan president Hugo Chávez [...] used the ballot box to weaken or eliminate term limits". The sustainability and stability of economic reforms associated with governments adhering to such socialism have also been questioned. Latin American countries have primarily financed their social programs with extractive exports like petroleum, natural gas and minerals, creating a dependency that some economists claim has caused inflation and slowed growth. While some critics say the crisis is caused by socialism or the country's socialist policies, its policies have been described as populist or "hyper-populist" and the crisis has more to do with authoritarianism as well as anti-democratic governance, corruption and mismanagement of the economy. According to analysts and critics alike, the Bolivarian government has used those populist policies in order to maintain political power.

Although socialists have welcomed a socialism of the 21st century, they have been skeptical of Latin America's examples and criticized their authoritarian qualities and occasional cults of personality. While citing their progressive role, they argue that the appropriate label for these governments is populism rather than socialism. Chávez and Maduro have been compared to Lenin and Stalin, respectively, including Chávez and Lenin's early deaths and the economic problems after their deaths. Maduro, who has joked about his similar appearance and walrus moustache with Stalin, argued he is not a new Stalin and claimed to be merely following Chávez. Nonetheless, Maduro has been variously described by newspapers such as the New Statesman and The Times as the "Stalin of the Caribbean" and the "tropical Stalin", respectively. According to The Daily Beast, Maduro has embraced the "tropical Stalin" moniker. According to Joshua Kurlantzick, Latin American countries such as Nicaragua and Venezuela have been following the Chinese model and are described as authoritarian capitalist regimes.

==== Venezuela ====
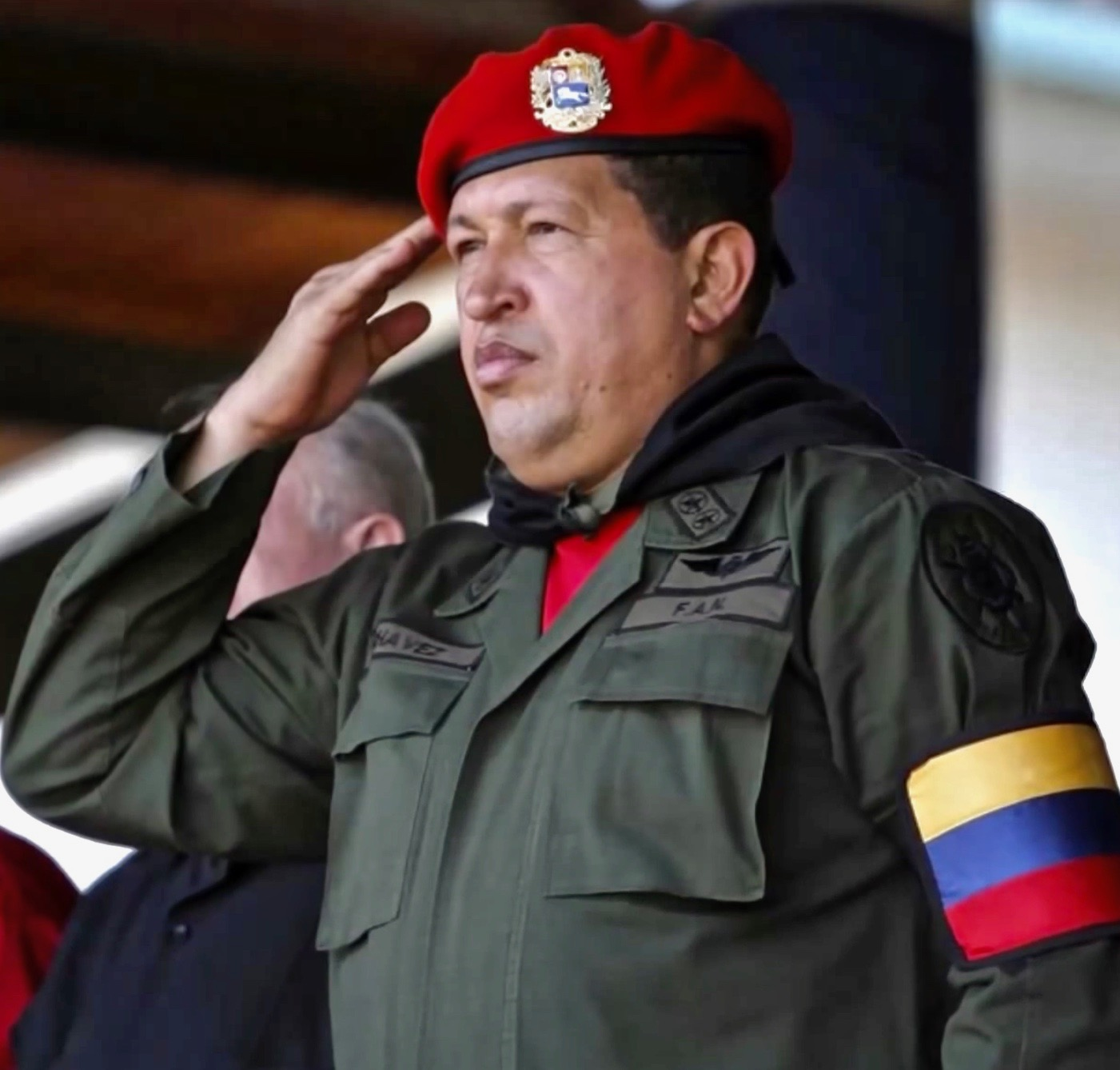
Hugo Chávez

Venezuela under Chávez and his Bolivarian Revolution moved toward authoritarian socialism. Chávez campaigned for a constituent assembly and to draft a new constitution, which was approved in 1999. The 1999 Venezuelan constitution eliminated much of Venezuela's checks and balances, Chávez's government controlled every branch of the Venezuelan government for over 15 years after it passed until the 2015 parliamentary election. The 1999 constitution also brought the military closer to political power, allowing military officers the right to vote, eliminating its apolitical nature, and transferring the function of military promotions of high officers to the president, which in the 1961 constitution was the responsibility of the Senate. By January 2007, after being reelected in the 2006 presidential election and swearing in as president, Chávez began openly proclaiming the ideology of socialism of the 21st century. The Bolivarian government used "centralized decision-making and a top-down approach to policy formation, the erosion of vertical power-sharing and concentration of power in the presidency, the progressive deinstitutionalization at all levels, and an increasingly paternalist relationship between state and society" in order to hasten changes in Venezuela. In practice, Chávez's administration proposed and enacted populist economic policies.

Using record-high oil revenues of the 2000s, his government nationalized key industries, created communal councils and implemented social programs known as the Bolivarian missions to expand access to food, housing, healthcare and education. Venezuela received high oil profits in the mid-2000s, resulting in improvements in areas such as poverty, literacy, income equality and quality of life occurring primarily between 2003 and 2007. However, those gains started to reverse after 2012 and it has been argued that government policies did not address structural inequalities.

On 2 June 2010, Chávez declared an economic war due to shortages in Venezuela, beginning the crisis in Bolivarian Venezuela. By the end of Chávez's presidency in the early 2010s, economic actions performed by his government during the preceding decade such as deficit spending and price controls proved to be unsustainable, with the economy of Venezuela faltering while poverty, inflation and shortages increased. His use of enabling acts and his government's use of Bolivarian propaganda were also controversial. On the socialist development in Venezuela, Chávez argued with the second government plan (Plan de la Patria) that "socialism has just begun to implant its internal dynamism among us" whilst acknowledging that "the socio-economic formation that still prevails in Venezuela is capitalist and rentier". This same thesis is defended by Maduro.

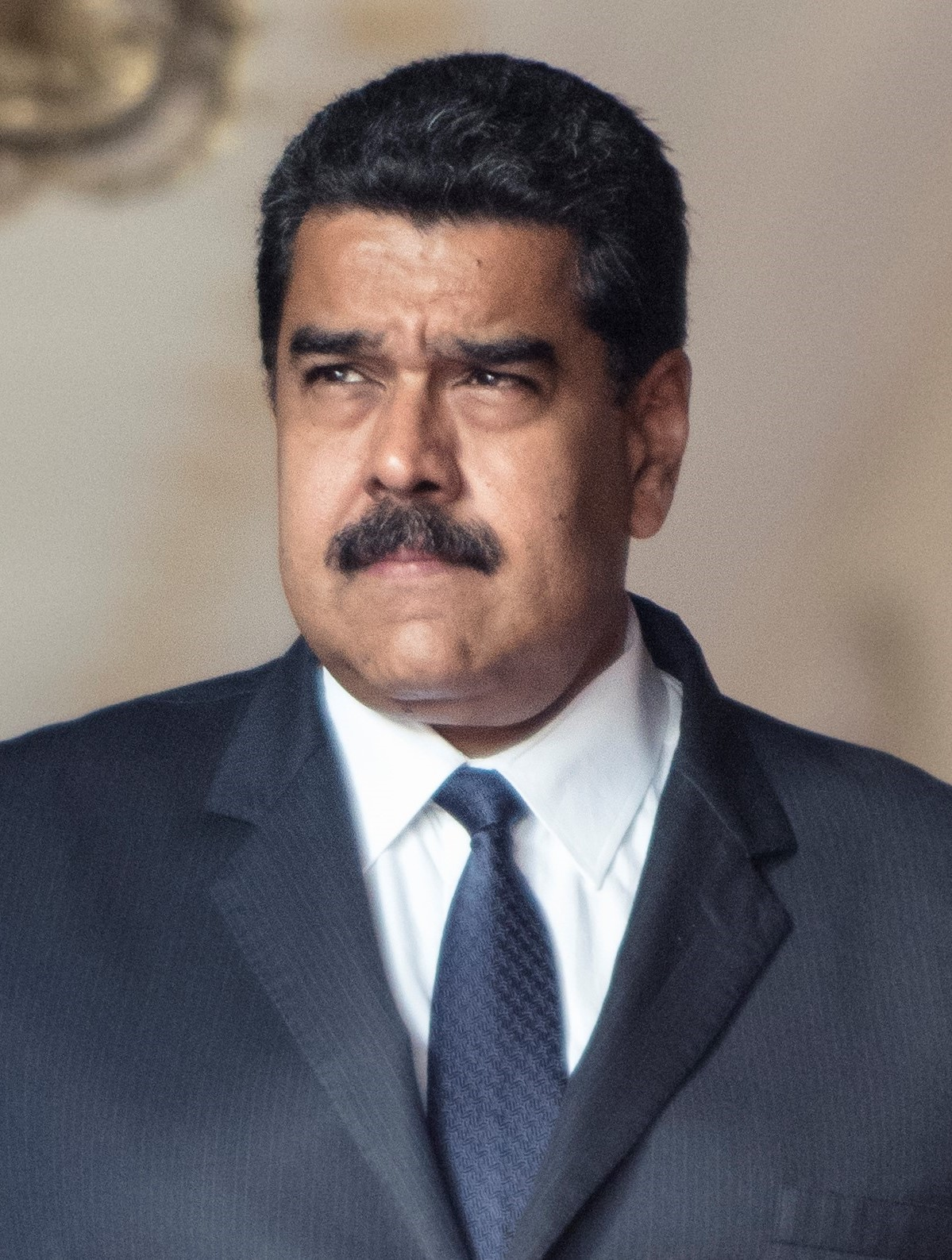
Nicolás Maduro

In 2015, The Economist argued that the Bolivarian Revolution in Venezuela—now under Nicolás Maduro after Chávez's death in 2013—was devolving from authoritarianism to dictatorship as opposition politicians were jailed for plotting to undermine the government, violence was widespread and independent media shut down. Chávez and Maduro administrations' economic policies led to shortages, a high inflation rate and a dysfunctional economy. The government has attributed Venezuela's economic problems to the decline in oil prices, sanctions imposed by the United States and economic sabotage by the opposition. Western media coverage of Chávez and other Latin American leaders from the 21st-century socialist movement has been criticized as unfair by their supporters and left-leaning media critics.

Broadly, chavismo policies include nationalization, social welfare programs and opposition to neoliberalism, particularly the policies of the International Monetary Fund and the World Bank. According to Chávez, Venezuelan socialism accepts private property, but this socialism is a form of social democracy that seeks to promote social property. In January 2007, Chávez proposed to build the communal state, whose main idea is to build self-government institutions like communal councils, communes and communal cities. While Chávez remained relatively popular throughout his time in office, Maduro suffered unpopularity with the deterioration of the economy during his tenure and there was a decline of self-identified chavistas.

Despite its socialist rhetoric, chavismo has been frequently described as being state capitalist by critics. Critics frequently point towards Venezuela's large private sector. In 2009, roughly 70% of Venezuela's gross domestic product was created by the private sector. According to Asa Cusack, an expert on Latin America and frequent contributor to mainstream media, Venezuela's economy remained "market-based and private-sector dominated" throughout Chávez's time in office. Although "the social economy and the public sector were heavily promoted", for example through nationalization, "the private sector was expected to remain dominant, and it did. A centrally planned socialist economy like Cuba's was neither the aim nor the reality". Chavismo has been widely discussed in the media.

According to Kirk A. Hawkins, scholars are generally divided into two camps, namely a liberal-democratic one that sees chavismo as an instance of democratic backsliding and a radical-democratic one that upholds chavismo as the fulfillment of its aspirations for participatory democracy. Hawkins argues that the most important division between these two groups is neither methodological nor theoretical, but ideological. It is a division over basic normative views of democracy, i.e. liberalism versus radicalism. Scholars in the first camp tended to adhere to a classical liberal ideology that valued procedural democracy (competitive elections, widespread participation defined primarily in terms of voting and civil liberties) as the political means best suited to achieving human welfare. They saw chavismo in a mostly negative light as a case of democratic backsliding or even competitive authoritarianism or electoral authoritarian regime. On the other hand, scholars in the second camp generally adhered to a classical socialist ideology that mistrusted market institutions in either the state or the economy. Although accepting the importance of liberal-democratic institutions, they saw procedural democracy as insufficient to ensure political inclusion and emphasized participatory forms of democracy and collective worker ownership in the economy.

== Criticism ==
=== Left-wing ===
Left-wing critics argue that it is a form of state capitalism that followed anti-imperialism, populism, nationalism and social democracy. Rather than representing a socialist planned economy, the Soviet model has been described in practice as either a form of state capitalism or a non-planned, command economy. The fidelity of those varied socialist revolutionaries, leaders and parties to the work of Karl Marx and that of other socialist thinkers is highly contested and has been rejected by many Marxists and other socialists alike. Some academics, scholars and socialists have criticized the linking of all leftist and socialist ideals to the excesses of authoritarian socialism.

==== Anarchism and Marxism ====
Many democratic and libertarian socialists, including anarchists, mutualists and syndicalists, deride it as state socialism for its support of a workers' state instead of abolishing the bourgeois state apparatus outright. They use the term in contrast with their own form of socialism which involves either collective ownership (in the form of worker cooperatives) or common ownership of the means of production without central planning by the state. Those libertarian socialists believe there is no need for a state in a socialist system because there would be no class to suppress and no need for an institution based on coercion and regard the state being a remnant of capitalism. They hold that statism is antithetical to true socialism, the goal of which is the eyes of libertarian socialists such as William Morris, who wrote as follows in a Commonweal article: "State Socialism? — I don't agree with it; in fact I think the two words contradict one another, and that it is the business of Socialism to destroy the State and put Free Society in its place".

Classical and orthodox Marxists also view the term as an oxymoron, arguing that while an association for managing production and economic affairs would exist in socialism, it would no longer be a state in the Marxist definition which is based on domination by one class. Preceding the Bolshevik-led revolution in Russia, many socialist groups—including reformists, orthodox Marxist currents such as council communism and the Mensheviks as well as anarchists and other libertarian socialists—criticized the idea of using the state to conduct planning and nationalization of the means of production as a way to establish socialism. Lenin himself acknowledged his policies as state capitalism, defending them from left-wing criticism, but arguing that they were necessary for the future development of socialism and not socialist in themselves.

American Marxist Raya Dunayevskaya dismissed it as a type of state capitalism because state ownership of the means of production is a form of state capitalism; the dictatorship of the proletariat is a form of democracy and single-party rule is undemocratic; and Marxism–Leninism is neither Marxism nor Leninism, but rather a composite ideology which socialist leaders such as Joseph Stalin used to expediently determine what is communism and what is not communism among the Eastern Bloc countries.

==== Left communism ====
Critical of the economy and government of socialist states, left communists such as the Italian Amadeo Bordiga argued that Marxism–Leninism was a form of political opportunism which preserved rather than destroyed capitalism because of the claim that the exchange of commodities would occur under socialism; the use of popular front organisations by the Communist International; and that a political vanguard organised by organic centralism was more effective than a vanguard organised by democratic centralism. For Bordiga and those left communists supporting his conception of Stalinism, Joseph Stalin and later Mao Zedong, Ho Chi Minh, Che Guevara and other anti-imperialist revolutionaries were great Romantic revolutionaries, i.e. bourgeois revolutionaries. According to this view, the Stalinist regimes that came into existence after 1945 were extending the bourgeois nature of prior revolutions that degenerated as all had in common a policy of expropriation and agrarian and productive development which those left communist considered negations of previous conditions and not the genuine construction of socialism. While the Russian Revolution was a proletarian revolution, it degenerated into a bourgeois revolution and represented the French Revolution of the Eastern and Third World, with socialism taking liberalism's place.

Although most Marxist–Leninists distinguish between communism and socialism, Bordiga, who did consider himself a Leninist and has been described as being "more Leninist than Lenin", did not distinguish between the two in the same way Marxist–Leninists do. Both Lenin and Bordiga did not see socialism as a separate mode of production from communism, but rather just as how communism looks as it emerges from capitalism before it has "developed on its own foundations". This is coherent with Marx and Engels, who used the terms communism and socialism interchangeably. Like Lenin, Bordiga used socialism to mean what Marx called the "lower-stage of communism". For Bordiga, both stages of communist or socialist society—with stages referring to historical materialism—were characterized by the gradual absence of money, the market and so on, the difference between them being that earlier in the first stage a system of rationing would be used to allocate goods to people while in communism this could be abandoned in favour of full free access. This view distinguished Bordiga from Marxist–Leninists, who tended and still tend to telescope the first two stages and so have money and the other exchange categories surviving into socialism, but Bordiga would have none of this. For him, no society in which money, buying and selling and the rest survived could be regarded as either socialist or communist—these exchange categories would die out before the socialist rather than the communist stage was reached. Stalin first made the claim that the Soviet Union had reached the lower stage of communism and argued that the law of value still operated within a socialist economy.

Other left communists such as the councilists explicitly reject the Leninist vanguard party and the organic centralism promoted by Bordigists. Otto Rühle saw the Soviet Union as a form of state capitalism that had much in common with the state-centred capitalism of the West as well as fascism. While Rühle saw the Leninist vanguardist party as an appropriate form for the overthrow of the tsarist autocracy, it was ultimately an inappropriate form for a proletarian revolution. For Rühle and others, no matter what the actual intentions of the Bolsheviks, what they actually succeeded in bringing about was much more like the bourgeois revolutions of Europe than a proletarian revolution.

==== Libertarian communism and socialism ====
A variety of non-state, libertarian communist and socialist positions reject the concept of a socialist state altogether, believing that the modern state is a byproduct of capitalism and cannot be used for the establishment of a socialist system. They reason that a socialist state is antithetical to socialism and that socialism will emerge spontaneously from the grassroots level in an evolutionary manner, developing its own unique political and economic institutions for a highly organized stateless society. Libertarian communists, including anarchists, councilists, leftists and Marxists, also reject the concept of a socialist state for being antithetical to socialism, but they believe that socialism and communism can only be established through revolution and dissolving the existence of the state. Within the socialist movement, there is criticism towards the use of the term socialist state in relation to countries such as China and previously of Soviet Union and Eastern and Central European states before what some term the "collapse of Stalinism" in 1989.

Anti-authoritarian communists and socialists such as anarchists, other democratic and libertarian socialists as well as revolutionary syndicalists and left communists claim that the so-called socialist states cannot be called socialist because they actually presided over state capitalist or non-planned administrative economies. Those socialists who oppose any system of state control whatsoever believe in a more decentralized approach which puts the means of production directly into the hands of the workers rather than indirectly through state bureaucracies which they claim represent a new elite or class.

This leads them to consider state socialism a form of state capitalism (an economy based on centralized management, capital accumulation and wage labor, but with the state owning the means of production) which Engels and other Bolshevik leaders such as Vladimir Lenin and Nikolai Bukharin stated would be the final form of capitalism rather than socialism. Similarly, others pointed out that nationalisation and state ownership have nothing to do with socialism by itself, having been historically carried out for various different purposes under a wide variety of different political and economic systems.

==== Trotskyism ====
Some Trotskyists following on from Tony Cliff deny that it is socialism, calling it state capitalism. Other Trotskyists agree that these states could not be described as socialist, but they deny that those states were capitalist, supporting Leon Trotsky's analysis of pre-restoration Soviet Union as a workers' state that had degenerated into a bureaucratic dictatorship which rested on a largely nationalized industry run according to a plan of production. and claimed that the former Stalinist states of Central and Eastern Europe were deformed workers' states based on the same relations of production as the Soviet Union.

Trotsky believed that regardless of their intellectual capacity, central planners operate without the input and participation of the millions of people who participate in the economy that can understand and respond to local conditions and changes in the economy. In advocating a decentralised planned socialist economy, Trotsky and some of his followers have criticized central state planning as being unable to effectively coordinate all economic activity.

Some Trotskyists have emphasised Trotsky's revolutionary-democratic socialism and Trotskyists such as Hal Draper described it as such. Those third camp revolutionary-democratic Trotskyists and socialists supported a socialist political revolution that would establish or re-establish socialist democracy in deformed or degenerated workers' states. Some such as Draper also compared social democracy and Stalinism as two forms of socialism from above.

=== Right-wing ===
Right-wing criticism is mainly related to communist party rule as well as anti-communism, anti-Marxism and anti-socialism. Another criticism is that of the economic calculation problem as first outlined by Austrian School economists Ludwig von Mises and Friedrich Hayek, followed by the socialist calculation debate.

Socialist states and state socialism are often conflated to and referred to by detractors simply as socialism. Austrian School economists such as Mises and Hayek continually used socialism as a synonym for authoritarian socialism and its command economy. The attributive state is usually added by socialists with a non-state-based method for achieving socialism to criticize state socialism. This is especially notable in the United States, where socialism is a pejorative term used to refer to either authoritarian socialist states, any state or tax-funded industry, program and service, or the degree of government and economic interventionism by the state.

In their broader critique of socialism, right-wing commentators have emphasised the lack of democracy in socialist states that are considered to be authoritarian or undemocratic, arguing that democracy and socialism are incompatible. Chicago School economist Milton Friedman argued that a "society which is socialist cannot also be democratic" in the sense of "guaranteeing individual freedom". Sociologist Robert Nisbet, a philosophical conservative who began his career as a leftist, argued in 1978 that there is "not a single free socialism to be found anywhere in the world". For anti-communist academic Richard Pipes, the tendency to "merge political and economic power" is "implicit in socialism" and authoritarianism is "virtually inevitable".

According to the Hungarian-born political sociologist and communist-studies scholar Paul Hollander, a critic of communism and left-wing politics in general, egalitarianism was one of the features of authoritarian socialist states that was so attractive to Western intellectuals that they quietly justified their authoritarianism and the murder of millions of capitalists, landowners and supposedly wealthy kulaks in order to achieve this equality.

== See also ==
- Anti-authoritarianism
- Authoritarianism
- Authoritarian capitalism
- Libertarian socialism
- State capitalism
- State socialism
- Tankie

== Bibliography ==
- Amandae, Sonja (2003). Rationalizing Capitalist Democracy: The Cold War Origins of Rational Choice Liberalism. University of Chicago Press. ISBN 978-0-226-01654-2.
- Applebaum, Anne (14 October 2014). "Understanding Stalin". The Atlantic.
- Balmforth, Tom (19 December 2018). "Russian nostalgia for Soviet Union reaches 13-year high". Reuters.
- Barrett, William, ed. (1 April 1978). "Capitalism, Socialism, and Democracy: A Symposium". Commentary. Archived from the original on 14 November 2017. Alt URL
- Bartmanski, Dominik (2011). "Successful icons of failed time: rethinking post-communist nostalgia". Acta Sociologica. 54 (3): 213–231. doi:10.1177/0001699311412625. S2CID 146782564.
- Becker, Jasper (25 September 2010). "Systematic genocide". The Spectator. Archived from the original on 11 April 2012.
- Bel, Germà (April 2006). "Against the mainstream: Nazi privatization in 1930s Germany" (PDF). Economic History Review. 63 (1). University of Barcelona: 34–55. doi:10.1111/j.1468-0289.2009.00473.x. hdl:2445/11716. S2CID 154486694.
- Berger, Mark T. (August 1997). "Review: Singapore's Authoritarian Capitalism: Asian Values, Free Market Illusions, and Political Dependency by Christopher Lingle". Journal of Asian Studies. 56 (3). Cambridge University Press: 853–854. doi:10.1017/S0021911800035129. JSTOR i325583. S2CID 153600219.
- Bhasin, Balbir B. (2007). "Fostering Entrepreneurship: Developing a Risktaking Culture in Singapore". New England Journal of Entrepreneurship. 10 (2): 39–50. doi:10.1108/NEJE-10-02-2007-B004. ISSN 1550-333X.
- Brzezinski, Zbigniew (1989). The Grand Failure: The Birth and Death of Communism in the Twentieth Century (1st ed.). New York: Scribner. ISBN 978-0-684-19034-1.
- Budhwar, Pawan S., ed. (2004). Managing Human Resources in Asia-Pacific. Psychology Press. ISBN 978-0-415-30006-3.
- Caute, David (2010). Politics and the novel during the Cold War. Transaction Publishers. ISBN 978-1-4128-3136-9.
- Chang, Jung; Halliday, Jon (2005). Mao: The Unknown Story. London: Jonathan Cape. ISBN 978-0-224-07126-0.
- Courtois, Stéphane; Werth, Nicolas; Panne, Jean-Louis; Paczkowski, Andrzej; Bartosek, Karel; Margolin, Jean-Louis; Kramer, Mark (1999). The Black Book of Communism: Crimes, Terror, Repression. Cambridge: Harvard University Press. ISBN 0-674-07608-7.
- Davies, Robert; Wheatcroft, Stephen G. (2004). The Industrialisation of Soviet Russia Volume 5: The Years of Hunger: Soviet Agriculture 1931-1933. Basingstoke and New York: Palgrave Macmillan. ISBN 978-0-230-23855-8.
- Dean, Jodi (2012). The Communist Horizon. Verso Books. ISBN 978-1-84467-954-6.
- Defty, Brook (2007). "2–5". Britain, America and Anti-Communist Propaganda 1945–1953. The Information Research Department.
- Deutscher, Isaac (2003) [1959]. The Prophet Unarmed: Trotsky 1921–1929. Verso Books. ISBN 978-1-85984-446-5.
- Dikötter, Frank (2010). Mao's Great Famine: The History of China's Most Devastating Catastrophe, 1958–62. London: Walker & Company. ISBN 978-0-8027-7768-3.
- Duncan, Maxim (28 September 2009). "Granddaughter Keeps Mao's Memory Alive in Bookshop". Reuters. Archived from the original on February 4, 2016.
- Ebrey, Patricia Buckley (2010). The Cambridge Illustrated History of China. Cambridge University Press. ISBN 978-0-521-12433-1 – via Google Books.
- Ehms, Jule (2014). "The Communist Horizon". Marx & Philosophy Review of Books. Marx & Philosophy Society. Archived from the original on 10 April 2016.
- Ekman, Joakim; Linde, Jonas (September 2005). "Communist nostalgia and the consolidation of democracy in Central and Eastern Europe". Journal of Communist Studies and Transition Politics. 21 (3): 354–374. doi:10.1080/13523270500183512. S2CID 154661789.
- Ellman, Michael (November 2002). "Soviet Repression Statistics: Some Comments" (PDF). Europe-Asia Studies. 54 (7). Taylor & Francis: 1151–1172. doi:10.1080/0966813022000017177. JSTOR 826310. S2CID 43510161. Archived from the original (PDF) on 2019-05-25.
- Esche, Christine; Mossiah, Rosa Katharina; Topalska, Sandra (2009). "Lost and Found: Communism Nostalgia and Communist Chic Among Poland's Old and Young Generations". Humanity in Action.
- Fenby, J. (2008). Modern China: The Fall and Rise of a Great Power, 1850 to the Present. Ecco Press. ISBN 978-0-06-166116-7.
- Fuchs, Christian (29 June 2017). "The Relevance of Franz L. Neumann's Critical Theory in 2017: Anxiety and Politics in the New Age of Authoritarian Capitalism" (PDF). Media, Culture & Society. 40 (5): 779–791. doi:10.1177/0163443718772147. S2CID 149705789. Archived from the original (PDF) on 13 October 2019.
- Fuchs, Christian (27 April 2018). "Authoritarian Capitalism, Authoritarian Movements, Authoritarian Communication" (PDF). tripleC. 15 (2): 637–650. doi:10.1177/0163443718772147. S2CID 149705789. Archived from the original (PDF) on 13 October 2019.
- Galtung, Marte Kjær; Stenslie, Stig (2014). 49 Myths About China. Rowman & Littlefield. ISBN 978-1-4422-3622-6.
- Gao, Mobo (2008). The Battle for China's Past: Mao and the Cultural Revolution. London: Pluto Press. ISBN 978-0-7453-2780-8.
- Gat, Azar (1 July 2007). "The Return of Authoritarian Great Powers". Foreign Affairs. 86 (4). Council on Foreign Relations: 59–69. JSTOR 20032415. Archived from the original on 15 February 2020.
- Getty, J. Arch; Rittersporn, Gábor; Zemskov, Viktor (October 1993). "Victims of the Soviet Penal System in the Pre-War Years: A First Approach on the Basis of Archival Evidence" (PDF). The American Historical Review. 98 (4). Oxford University Press: 1017–1049. doi:10.2307/2166597. JSTOR 2166597. Archived from the original (PDF) on 2019-12-06.
- Geyes, Michael; Fitzpatrick, Sheila, eds. (2008). Beyond Totalitarianism: Stalinism and Nazism Compared. Cambridge University Press. doi:10.1017/CBO9780511802652. ISBN 978-0-521-72397-8.
- Ghodsee, Kristen (2011). "Dr. Kristen Ghodsee, Bowdoin College - Nostalgia for Communism". The Academic Minute. WAMC. Archived from the original on 11 November 2020.
- Ghodsee, Kristen; Mead, Julia (2018). "What Has Socialism Ever Done For Women?" (PDF). Catalyst. 2 (2): 108.
- Gill, Graeme J. (1998). Stalinism. Palgrave Macmillan. ISBN 978-0-312-17764-5.
- Golinowska, Karolina (Autumn 2016). "Nostalgia for the PRL in contemporary Poland". Twentieth Century Communism. 11 (11): 67–82. doi:10.3898/175864316819698512. Archived from the original on 10 August 2020.
- Guilhot, Nicholas (2005). The Democracy Makers: Human Rights and International Order. Columbia University Press. ISBN 978-0-231-13124-7.
- Heilbroner, Robert L.; Barkan, Joanne; Brand, Horst; Cohen, Mitchell; Coser, Lewis; Denitch, Bogdan; Fehèr, Ferenc; Heller, Agnès; Horvat, Branko; Tyler, Gus (Winter 1991). "From Sweden to Socialism: A Small Symposium on Big Questions". Dissident. pp. 96–110.
- Hobsbawm, Eric J. (2012). Revolutionaries. Abacus. ISBN 978-0-34-912056-0.
- Huntington, Samuel P. (1970). Authoritarian Politics in Modern Society: The Dynamics of Established One-party Systems. Basic Books. ISBN 978-0-465-00569-7.
- Kendall, Diana (2011). Sociology in Our Time: The Essentials. Cengage Learning. pp. 125–127. ISBN 978-1-111-30550-5.
- Khlevniuk, Oleg V. (2015). Stalin: New Biography of a Dictator. Translated by Favorov, Nora Seligman. New Haven and London: Yale University Press. ISBN 978-0-300-16388-9.
- Kimball, Alan (September 1973). "The First International and the Russian Obshchina". Slavic Review. 32 (3). Cambridge University Press: 491–514. doi:10.2307/2495406. ISSN 0037-6779. JSTOR 2495406. S2CID 164131867.
- Kotkin, Stephen (2014). Stalin: Paradoxes of Power, 1878–1928. London: Allen Lane. ISBN 978-0-7139-9944-0.
- Lee, Stephen J. (2003). Lenin and Revolutionary Russia. London: Routledge. ISBN 978-0-415-28718-0.
- Leggett, George (1986) [1981]. The Cheka: Lenin's Political Police. Oxford University Press. ISBN 978-0-19-822862-2.
- Lewin, Moshe (1969). Lenin's Last Struggle. Translated by Sheridan Smith, A. M. London: Faber and Faber. ISBN 978-0-571-08713-6.
- Lewin, Moshe (2005). Lenin's Last Testament. Ann Arbor: University of Michigan Press. ISBN 978-0-472-03052-1.
- Li, He (2015). Political Thought and China's Transformation: Ideas Shaping Reform in Post-Mao China. Springer. pp. 60–69. ISBN 978-1-137-42781-6.
- Lingle, Christopher; Owens, Amanda J.; Rowley, Charles K., eds. (Summer 1998). "Singapore and Authoritarian Capitalism". The Locke Luminary. I (1).
- Löwy, Michael (1986). "Mass organization, party, and state: Democracy in the transition to socialism". Transition and Development: Problems of Third World Socialism. 94.
- Lynch, Michael (2004). Mao. Routledge Historical Biographies. Routledge.
- Márquez, Laureano; Sanabria, Eduardo (2018). Historieta de Venezuela: De Macuro a Maduro (1st ed.). Gráficas Pedrazas. ISBN 978-1-7328777-1-9.
- Mayer, Robert (Summer 1993). "Lenin and the Concept of the Professional Revolutionary". History of Political Thought. 14 (2): 249–263. ISSN 0143-781X. JSTOR 26214357.
- McCauley, Martin (2003). Stalin and Stalinism (3rd ed.). Harlow and London: Pearson. ISBN 978-0-582-50587-2.
- McClellan, Woodford (September 1973). "Nechaevshchina: An Unknown Chapter". Slavic Review. 32 (3). Cambridge University Press: 546–553. doi:10.2307/2495409. ISSN 0037-6779. JSTOR 2495409.
- McDermott, Kevin (2006). Stalin: Revolutionary in an Era of War. Basingstoke and New York: Palgrave Macmillan. ISBN 978-0-333-71122-4.
- Medvedev, Roy (1982). Leninism and Western Socialism. Schocken Books. ISBN 978-0-8052-7104-1.
- Milne, Seumas (12 September 2002). "The battle for history". The Guardian.
- Milne, Seumas (16 February 2006). "Communism may be dead, but clearly not dead enough". The Guardian.
- Milne, Seumas (2012). The Revenge of History: The Battle for the 21st Century. Verso Books. ISBN 978-1-84467-964-5.
- Montefiore, Simon Sebag (2007). Young Stalin. London: Weidenfeld & Nicolson. ISBN 978-0-297-85068-7.
- Murawska, Renata (6 March 2005). "Of the Polish People's Republic and its Memory in Polish Film" (PDF). KinoKultura. 2.
- Nikitin, Vadim (5 March 2014). "Putin is exploiting the legacy of the Soviet Union to further Russia's ends in Ukraine". The Independent.
- Nugent, Margaret Latus (1992). From Leninism to Freedom: The Challenges of Democratization. Boulder: Westview Press. ISBN 978-0-8133-8524-2.
- O'Brien, Patrick Karl (2002). Atlas of World History. Oxford University Press. ISBN 0-19-521921-X – via Google Books.
- Parenti, Michael (1997). Blackshirts and Reds: Rational Fascism and the Overthrow of Communism. San Francisco: City Lights Books. ISBN 978-0-87286-330-9.
- Pipes, Richard (1996). The Unknown Lenin: From the Secret Archive. New Haven, Connecticut: Yale University Press. ISBN 978-0-300-06919-8.
- Pipes, Richard (1997) [1995]. Three "Whys" of the Russian Revolution. Vintage Books. ISBN 978-0-679-77646-8.
- Pipes, Richard (2003) [2001]. Communism: A History. Modern Library Chronicles. ISBN 978-0-8129-6864-4.
- Prusik, Monika; Lewicka, Maria (October 2016). "Nostalgia for Communist Times and Autobiographical Memory: Negative Present or Positive Past?". Political Psychology. 37 (5): 677–693. doi:10.1111/pops.12330.
- Radzinsky, Edvard (1997) [1996]. Stalin: The First In-depth Biography Based on Explosive New Documents from Russia's Secret Archives. Anchor Books. ISBN 978-0-385-47954-7.
- Rakitin, Alexander (2 March 2019). "Sergey Nechayev: "temnyy chulanchik" russkoy revolyutsii" Сергей Нечаев: "темный чуланчик" русской революции [Sergei Nechaev: the "dark closet" of the Russian revolution]. Mirtesen (in Russian). Finam. Archived from the original on 29 March 2019.
- Read, Christopher (2005). Lenin: A Revolutionary Life. Routledge Historical Biographies. London: Routledge. ISBN 978-0-415-20649-5.
- Reisch, George A. (2005). How the Cold War Transformed Philosophy of Science: To the Icy Slopes of Logic. Cambridge University Press. ISBN 978-0-521-54689-8.
- Rigby, T. H. (1979). Lenin's Government: Sovnarkom 1917–1922. Cambridge, England: Cambridge University Press. ISBN 978-0-521-22281-5.
- Ryan, James (2012). Lenin's Terror: The Ideological Origins of Early Soviet State Violence. London: Routledge. ISBN 978-1-138-81568-1.
- Rosefielde, Steven (1996). "Stalinism in Post-Communist Perspective: New Evidence on Killings, Forced Labour and Economic Growth in the 1930s". Europe-Asia Studies. 48 (6). Taylor & Francis: 959–987. doi:10.1080/09668139608412393. JSTOR 152635.
- Sachno, Sergiusz O. (14 March 2003). "Kapitan Żbik na tropie oranżady" [Captain Żbik on the trail of orangeade]. Wprost (in Polish).
- Sandle, Mark (1999). A Short History of Soviet Socialism. London: UCL Press. doi:10.4324/9780203500279. ISBN 978-1-85728-355-6.
- Schulman, Jason (2006). "The Case for Socialism in the Twenty-First Century". Democratic Left. 47.
- Service, Robert (1990). "Lenin: Individual and Politics in the October Revolution". Modern History Review. 2 (1): 16–19.
- Service, Robert (2000). Lenin: A Biography. London: Macmillan. ISBN 978-0-333-72625-9.
- Service, Robert (2004). Stalin: A Biography. London: Macmillan. ISBN 978-0-333-72627-3.
- Short, Philip (2001). Mao: A Life. Owl Books. ISBN 978-0-8050-6638-8.
- Siegel, Achim, ed. (1998). The Totalitarian Paradigm after the End of Communism: Towards a Theoretical Reassessment. Rodopi. ISBN 978-90-420-0552-5.
- Taylor, A. (9 June 2014). "Calls for a return to 'Stalingrad' name test the limits of Putin's Soviet nostalgia". The Washington Post.
- Todorova, Maria; Gille, Zsuzsa (2010). Post-communist Nostalgia. Berghahn Books. ISBN 978-1-84545-671-9.
- Traverso, Enzo (2001). Le Totalitarisme: Le XXe siècle en débat [Totalitarianism: The 20th century in debate] (in French). Poche. ISBN 978-2-02-037857-4.
- Wallace, Ian G. (June 1992). "The Influences of Chernyshevsky, Tkachev, and Nechaev on the Political Thought of V.I. Lenin" (PDF). Hamilton, Ontario: McMaster University.
- Watts, Jonathan (2 June 2005). "China must confront dark past, says Mao confidant". The Guardian.
- Wheatcroft, Stephen G. (1996). "The Scale and Nature of German and Soviet Repression and Mass Killings, 1930–45" (PDF). Europe-Asia Studies. 48 (8): 1319–1353. doi:10.1080/09668139608412415. JSTOR 152781. Archived from the original (PDF) on 2011-07-17.
- Wolff, Richard D. (27 June 2015). "Socialism Means Abolishing the Distinction Between Bosses and Employees". Truthout. Archived from the original on 11 March 2018.
