= Leggott =

Leggott is a surname. Notable people with the surname include:

- Michele Leggott (born 1956), New Zealand academic and poet
- Sarah Leggott (born 1970), New Zealand academic

== See also ==
- Leggett (surname)
