= Leggett (surname) =

Leggett is an English surname. Notable people with the surname include:

- Anne M. Leggett, American mathematician
- Anthony James Leggett (1938–2026), British–American theoretical physicist and academic
- Archibald Herbert Leggett (1877–1936), British general
- Christopher Leggett, American film producer
- Betty Leggett, American spiritualist and socialite
- George Leggett (disambiguation), multiple people
- Jack Leggett (b. 1954), American college baseball coach
- Jordan Leggett (b. 1995), American football player
- Isiah Leggett (b. 1944), American politician from Maryland
- Jay Leggett (1963–2013), American actor
- Jeremy Leggett (b. 1954), British social entrepreneur and writer
- Kimberley Leggett (b. 1993), Malaysian beauty pageant titleholder
- Mary Leggett Cooke (1852-1938), American Unitarian minister and member of the Iowa Sisterhood
- Maurice Leggett (b. 1986), American football player
- Mortimer Dormer Leggett (1821–1896), American Union Army general
- Robert L. Leggett (1926–1997), U.S. Representative from California
- Sidney Leggett, English footballer
- Timothy Dalton Leggett (b. 1946), British actor
- Trevor Leggett (1914–2000), judoka, and writer on Zen and Yoga
- Vanessa Leggett (b. 1968), American freelance journalist, author, lecturer and First Amendment advocate jailed for protecting sources
- William Leggett (disambiguation), multiple people
