= Arkinstall =

Arkinstall is a surname. Notable people with the surname include:

- Christine Reta Arkinstall (born 1954), New Zealand academic
- Jack Arkinstall (1920–1976), Australian tennis player
