= Administrative-command system =

Centralized economic planning and distribution under state socialism

The administrative-command system (Russian: Административно-командная система, romanized: Administrativno-komandnaya sistema), also known as the command-administrative system, is the system of management of an economy of a state characterized by the rigid centralization of economic planning and distribution of goods, based on the state ownership of the means of production and carried out by the governmental and communist party bureaucracies ("nomenklatura") in the absence of a market economy.

The term is used to describe the economy of the Soviet Union and the economies of the Soviet Bloc which closely followed the Soviet model. In his 2004 book The Political Economy of Stalinism: Evidence from the Soviet Secret Archives, Paul Roderick Gregory argues that the collapse of the Soviet Union was due to the inherent drawbacks of the system, namely poor planning, low expertise of planners, unreliable supply lines, conflict between planners and producers and the dictatorial chain of command. Gregory writes that "the system was managed by thousands of 'Stalins' in a nested dictatorship".

Historian Robert Vincent Daniels regarded the Stalinist period to represent an abrupt break with Lenin's government in terms of economic planning in which a deliberated, scientific system of planning that featured former Menshevik economists at Gosplan had been replaced with a hasty version of planning with unrealistic targets, bureaucratic waste, bottlenecks and shortages. Stalin's formulations of national plans in terms of physical quantity of output was also attributed by Daniels as a source for the stagnant levels of efficiency and quality.

== History of the term ==
Already in 1985, John Howard Wilhelm’s article "The Soviet Union has an administered, not a planned, economy" argued that the common description of the Soviet-type economic planning as planned economy is misleading. While central planning did play an important role, the Soviet economy was de facto characterized by the priority of highly centralized management over planning. Therefore, he writes the correct term would be "centrally managed" rather than "centrally planned" economy.

The term administrative system was introduced by Russian economist Gavriil Kharitonovich Popov during the perestroika period in the Soviet Union as the title of a section in his 1987 article "From the Point of View of an Economist" which analyzed the novel of Alexander Bek, New Assignment banned in the Soviet Union. It was published in Russian in 1986 with the beginning of perestroika and was widely discussed in the society. The term was picked up by Mikhail Gorbachev, who used the expression "administrative-command system" in his November 2, 1987 speech. The concept was further expounded in Popov's 1990 collection of his essays Блеск и нищета административной системы [The Splendors and Miseries of the Administrative System].

== See also ==
- Cameralism, German science of administration in the 18th and early 19th centuries that aimed at strong management of a centralized economy for mainly the state's benefit, closely associated with the development of bureaucracy.
- Economy of the Soviet Union
- Soviet-type economic planning
- State capitalism
- State socialism
