= Sarah Leggott =

New Zealand literature academic

- Born: Sarah Janet Leggott; 1970 (age 55–56)
- Education: University of Auckland
- Scientific career
- Fields: Spanish literature, autobiography
- Workplaces: Victoria University of Wellington
- Thesis: Reinscribing the female historical subject : auto/biographical voices of contemporary Spanish women writers (1999)
- Doctoral advisor: Christine Reta Arkinstall

Sarah Janet Leggott (born 1970) is a New Zealand literature academic. She is currently a full professor at the Victoria University of Wellington.

== Academic career ==
After a 1999 PhD titled 'Reinscribing the female historical subject: auto/biographical voices of contemporary Spanish women writers' at the University of Auckland, she moved to the Victoria University of Wellington, rising to full professor. In December 2021, Leggott was appointed Acting Pro Vice-Chancellor for both the Wellington Faculty of Humanities and Social Sciences and the Wellington Faculty of Education. She will hold this role until a new vice-chancellor replaces Grant Guilford, who has retired.

== Selected works ==
- Leggott, Sarah. History and autobiography in contemporary Spanish women's testimonial writings. Vol. 8. Edwin Mellen Press, 2001.
- Leggott, Sarah. "Memory, Postmemory, Trauma: The Spanish Civil War in Recent Novels by Women." (2009).
- Leggott, Sarah. Memory, War, and Dictatorship in Recent Spanish Fiction by Women. Bucknell University Press, 2015.
- Leggott, Sarah. The Workings of Memory: Life-Writing by Women in Early Twentieth-Century Spain. Associated University Presse, 2008.
- Leggott, Sarah. "Re-membering Self and Nation: Memory and Life-Writing in Works by Josefina Aldecoa." Confluencia (2004): 11–20.
