= Christine Reta Arkinstall =

New Zealand academic

- Education: University of Auckland, University of Oviedo
- Scientific career
- Thesis: El sujeto en el exilio : un estudio de la obra poética de Francisco Brines, José Angel Valente y José Manuel Caballero Bonald (1990)
- Doctoral students: Sarah Leggott

Christine Reta Arkinstall (born 1954) is a New Zealand academic. She is currently professor of European languages and literature at the University of Auckland.

== Career ==
After a BA from University of Auckland, Arkinstall obtained a Masters from University of Oviedo in Spain, before returning to Auckland for a PhD entitled 'El sujeto en el exilio: un estudio de la obra poética de Francisco Brines, José Angel Valente y José Manuel Caballero Bonald.' She joined the staff, researching nationhood and gender ideas in Spanish-speaking literatures. Rising to full professor in 2010.
