= William Leggett =

William Leggett may refer to:

- William Leggett (writer) (1801–1839), American poet, fiction writer, and journalist
- William C. Leggett (born 1939), Canadian fish ecologist and oceanographer, former Principal of Queen's University
- William Henry Leggett (1816–1882), American botanist and journalist
- William J. Leggett (1848–1925), college football player, team captain of Rutgers in the first ever game
