= Sidney Leggett =

English footballer

Personal information
- Full name: Sidney Leggett
- Date of birth: 1897
- Place of birth: Clapton, England
- Position: Inside right

Senior career*
Years	Team	Apps	(Gls)
1913–1914	Fulham	0	(0)
1914–1921	Clapton Orient	1	(0)
1921–1924	Tunbridge Wells Rangers		
- Folkestone
- * Club domestic league appearances and goals

Sidney Leggett was an English footballer who played as an inside right in the Football League for Clapton Orient.

== Personal life ==
Leggett served as a private in the British Army during the First World War.
