= George Leggett =

George Leggett may refer to:

- George Leggett (footballer) (1879–1959), Australian rules footballer
- George Leggett (neo-Nazi) (1937–?), American neo-Nazi militant
