= Economic planning systems of communist states =

Centralized investment and economic input decision-making model under Leninist states

Economic planning systems of communist states is the specific model of centralized planning employed by communist states, which has its origins in the economy of the Soviet Union, and formally based on democratic centralism.

The post-perestroika analysis of the system of the Soviet economic planning describes it as the administrative-command system due to the de facto priority of highly centralized management over planning. An example of analytical approach to several stages of the Soviet political-economic model can be found in the works of Soviet economist Lev Gatovsky.

== Characteristics ==
=== Institutions ===
The major institutions of Soviet-type planning in the Soviet Union (USSR) included a planning agency (Gosplan), an organization for allocating state supplies among the various organizations and enterprises in the economy (Gossnab) and enterprises which were engaged in the production and delivery of goods and services in the economy. Enterprises comprised production associations and institutes that were linked together by the plans formulated by Gosplan.

In the Eastern bloc countries (Bulgaria, Czechoslovakia, East Germany, Hungary, Poland, Romania, and Albania), economic planning was primarily accomplished through the Council for Mutual Economic Assistance (CMEA), an international organization meant to promote the coordination of Soviet economic policy amongst the participating countries. The council was founded in 1949 and worked to maintain the Soviet style of economic planning in the Eastern bloc until the Soviet Union's dissolution in 1991.

There is a small amount of information in state archives regarding the founding of CMEA, but documents from the Romania state archive suggest that the Romanian Communist Party was instrumental in beginning the process which led to the creation of the council. Originally, Romania wanted to create a collaborative economic system which would bolster the country's efforts to industrialize. However, the Czech and Polish representatives wanted to have a system of specialization put into place, wherein production plans would be shared amongst members, and each country would specialize in a different area of production. The USSR encouraged the formation of the council as a response to the United States’ Marshall Plan, in hopes of maintaining their sphere of influence in Eastern Europe. There also existed the hope that the less developed member states would ‘catch-up’ economically with the more industrialized ones.

=== Material balances ===
Material balance planning was the major function of Gosplan in the USSR. This method of planning involved the accounting of material supplies in natural units (as opposed to monetary terms) which are used to balance the supply of available inputs with targeted outputs. Material balancing involves taking a survey of available inputs and raw materials in the economy and then using a balance-sheet to balance them with output targets specified by industry to achieve a balance between supply and demand. This balance is used to formulate a plan for the national economy.

== Analysis of Soviet-type planning ==
There are two fundamental ways scholars have carried out an analysis of Soviet-type economic planning. The first involves adapting standard neoclassical economic models and theories to analyze the Soviet economic system. This paradigm stresses the importance of Pareto efficiency standard.

In contrast to this approach, scholars such as Pawel Dembinski argue that neoclassical tools are somewhat inappropriate for evaluating Soviet-type planning because they attempt to quantify and measure phenomena specific to capitalist-based economies. They contend that because standard economic models rely on assumptions not fulfilled in the Soviet system (especially the assumption of economic rationality underlying decision-making), the results obtained from a neoclassical analysis will distort the actual effects of the planning system. These other scholars proceed along a different course by trying to engage with the communist state planning system on its own terms, investigating the philosophical, historical and political influences that gave rise to the planning system whilst evaluating its economic successes and failures (theoretical and actual) with reference to those contexts.

Economists Allin F. Cottrell and Paul Cockshott defended and argued for a return to Soviet-type economic planning in their 1993 book Towards a New Socialism.

The USSR practiced some form of central planning beginning in 1918 with War Communism until it dissolved in 1991, although the type and extent of planning was of a different nature before imperative centralized planning was introduced in the 1930s. While there were many subtleties to the various forms of economic organization the USSR employed during this 70-year time period, enough features were shared that scholars have broadly examined advantages and disadvantages of Soviet-type economic planning.

Soviet-type planning is not the same as economic planning in general as there are other theoretical models of economic planning and modern mixed economies also practice economic planning to a certain extent, but they are not subject to all of the advantages and disadvantages enumerated here. Moreover, the soviet economy and its organization endured several major changes, especially during the 1965 Soviet Economic Reform, and it can be seen in the works of Soviet economists such as Lev Gatovsky.

In his work, Revolution Betrayed, Trotsky argued that the excessive authoritarianism under Stalin had undermined the implementation of the First five-year plan. He noted that several engineers and economists who had created the plan were themselves later put on trial as "conscious wreckers who had acted on the instructions of a foreign power". Trotsky also maintained that the disproportions and imbalances which became characteristic of Stalinist planning in the 1930s such as the underdeveloped consumer base along with the priority focus on heavy industry were due to a number of avoidable problems. He argued that the industrial drive had been enacted under more severe circumstances, several years later and in a less rational manner than proposal originally conceived by the Left Opposition.

== Features ==
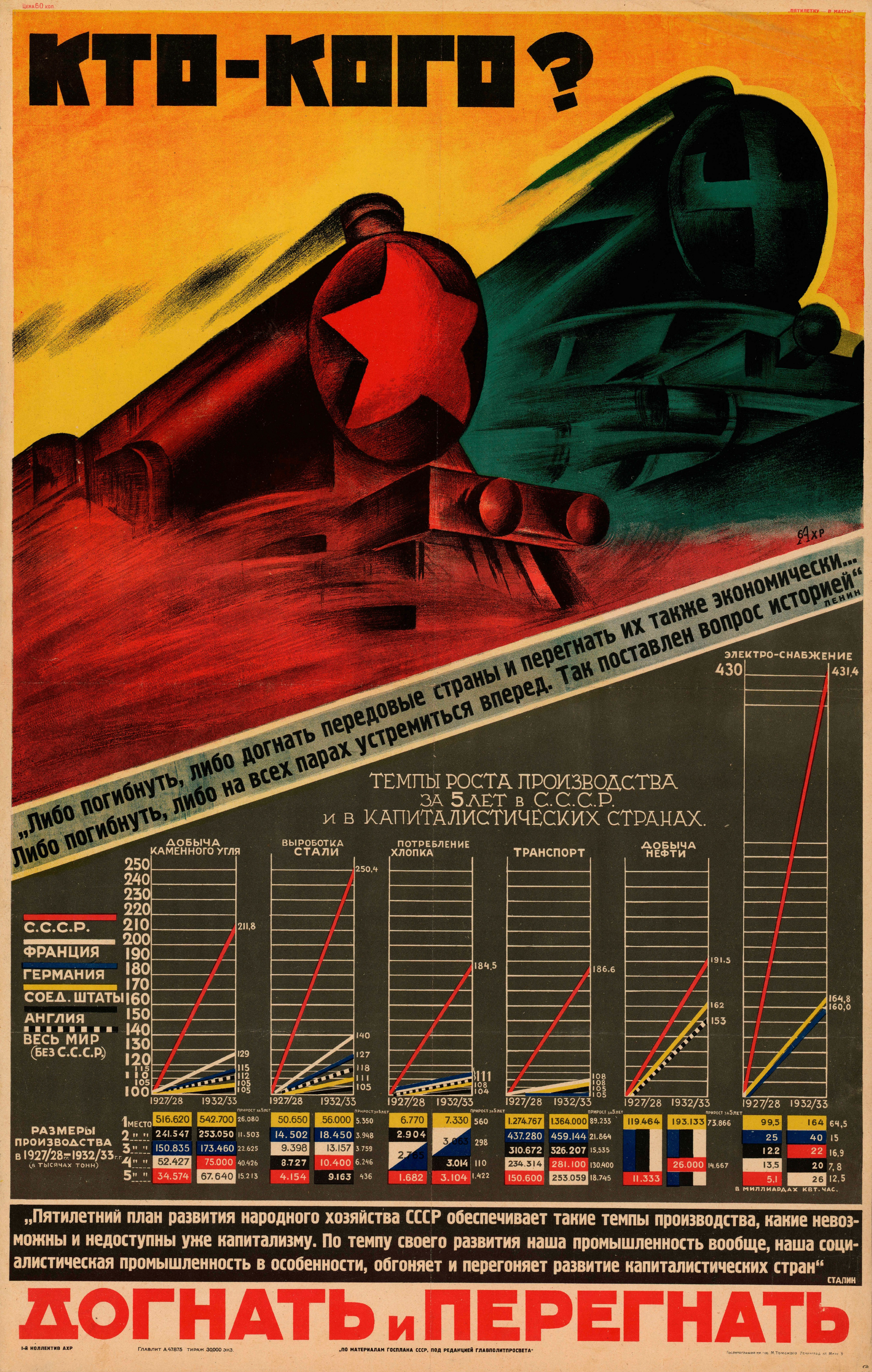
"Catch up and overtake" (Russian: Кто кого? Догнать и перегнать). A 1929 Soviet propaganda poster based on 1917 paraphrase from Lenin, praising the economic superiority of state socialism.

The unique features of Soviet-style economy were an ideologically driven attempt to build a total economic plan for the whole society, as well as unquestioned paradigm of superiority of the state socialist system. Attempts to modify or optimize the former based on pragmatic analysis of economic outcomes were hindered by the latter. Dembinski describes the Soviet approach to Marxist economy as "quasi-religious" with economic publications by Marx and Lenin being treated as a "Scripture".

Michael Ellman describes specific features of the Soviet economic planning in economic and mathematical terms, highlighting its primarily computational challenges. The theoretical objective of the Soviet economic planning, as executed by Gosplan, was rational allocation of resources in a way that resulted in output of desired assortment of goods and services. The plan was built and executed in annual cycles: each year, a target output of specific goods were determined and using estimates of available input resources Gosplan would calculate balance sheets planning output for all factories. As the number of commodities reached hundreds of thousands, a number of aggregations and simplifications were made to facilitate the calculations, which, until late 1960s, were performed manually.

=== Actual performance ===
At first, the USSR's growth in GDP per capita compared favorably with Western Europe. In 1913, prior to the revolution of 1917, the Russian Empire had a GDP per capita of $1,488 in international dollars which grew 461% to $6,871 by 1990. By comparison, Western Europe grew from a higher base of $3,688 international dollars by a comparable 457% to $16,872 in the same period and reached $17,921 by 1998. Following the fall of the USSR in 1991, its GDP per capita figure fell to $3,893 by 1998.

One 1986 publication compared Physical Quality of Life Index (PQLI) based on infant mortality, life expectancy and literacy rate (World Bank data) and other indicators such as number of patients per physician and argued that countries that predominantly used socialist-style economic planning in their economies achieved slightly better indicators at low and medium levels of income than countries with predominantly market-oriented economies at the same levels of economic development. The gap narrowed down in case of medium and high income countries. In addition, all of the countries in the high income category were ones the study categorized as "capitalist" and none "socialist".

Starting in the 1960s, following the market orientated Kosygin Reforms, the Soviet economy suffered from stagnation and became increasingly dependent on undisclosed loans from capitalist countries that were members of the Paris Club, while continuing to present Marxism as progressive and superior to a market economy. At the moment of its default and the dissolution of USSR, Russia alone owed $22 billion to the club, with other Eastern Bloc countries taking loans on their own account.

Widespread shortage of goods and failures of supply chain were presented as "temporary difficulties" by official propaganda, but numerous scholars in the Eastern bloc argued that these are systemic flaws of the Soviet economy. János Kornai coined the term "economy of shortage" to describe the state of the Soviet economy. Leszek Kołakowski presented the political and economic state of Eastern bloc authoritarianism as a logical consequence of Marxism–Leninism, rather than a "deviation". Nikolay Shmelyov described the state of the Soviet economy in the '80s as having large-scale systemic inefficiencies and unbalanced outputs, with one good being constantly in shortage, while others were constantly in surplus and wasted. These issues were naturally observed by Soviet economists, but any proposals to change the basic operating paradigms of the economic planning in response to observed inefficiencies were blocked by ideological hardliners, who perceived them as an unacceptable deviation from Marxism–Leninism, an economic model which they perceived to be "scientifically" proven to be superior.

The New Economic Policy (1921–1928) was a short period of economic pragmatism in the Soviet economics, introduced by Lenin in response to widely observed shortcomings of the War Communism system following the 1917 revolution. NEP, however, was criticized as reactionary and reversed by Stalin, who returned to total economic planning.

Falsification of statistics and "output juggling" of factories in order to satisfy central plans became a widespread phenomenon, leading to discrepancies between "reality of the plan" and the actual availability of goods as observed on site by consumers. Plan failures, when it was no longer possible to hide them, were blamed on sabotage and "wrecking". Shortages and poor living conditions led to industrial actions and protests, usually violently suppressed by the military and security forces, such as the Novocherkassk massacre.

=== Performance in the Eastern Bloc ===
==== Poland ====
The destruction caused by World War 2 had resulted in significant damage to the Polish nation. Alongside the millions killed in the Holocaust, Polish industry and infrastructure in 1945 was only 48% of what it had been in 1938. However, reconstruction under the Polish People's Republic saw quick recovery, such that by 1948 industrial output was 153% of what it had been in 1938. This growth continued throughout the Cold War, with industrial output in 1977 being 193% of what it had been in 1971.

Poland during the Cold War also saw advancements in healthcare. Before the Second World War, Poland was one of the countries with the poorest health in Europe. In the 1930s life expectancy in Poland was around 46 years and infant mortality was estimated at the level of 150 deaths per 1000 live births. Following the creation of the Polish People's Republic, the life expectancy in Poland increased to 70 years and infant mortality decreased to 30 deaths per 1000 live births. However, this success was limited by a rise in alcohol and cigarette consumption, which saw a rise in preventable deaths.

==== Council for Mutual Economic Assistance ====
During the 1950s, the economic alliance between members of the Eastern bloc and the state monopoly acted as a safety net in the face of economic sanctions being imposed. As a result, the Eastern Bloc countries started to develop autarkic tendencies which would last until the Soviet Union's dissolution. Trade was also able to grow, not just between member states but within them as well, and the agrarian states of the eastern bloc began to industrialize. The Soviet Union also gave Eastern bloc countries subsidies in the form of raw materials at prices lower than those offered in the global market. However, despite these efforts, varying degrees of development still remained between the industrialized countries and the more agrarian ones, which would contribute to the Bloc's economic stagnation in later decades.

The council began to lose its credibility from the 1960s onwards, because disagreements between member countries over the necessity of various reforms led to the slowing of economic growth. In order to encourage economic integration and maintain soviet economic planning, the International Bank for Economic Cooperation was established in Moscow in 1963, and the 'transferable ruble' was introduced. The integration failed to materialize for a number of reasons. Firstly, the new currency was separated from foreign trade as is characteristic of centralized planned economies, and so was not able to perform the various functions of money outside of being a unit of account Additionally, integration failed due to a general lack of interest, as well as the implementation of 'market liberalization' policies within several member states throughout the decade. Hence, the CMEA switched gears in the second half of the 1960s, and instead a reform was proposed which encouraged countries to pursue their own specialized industrialization projects without the needed participation of all other member states. East Germany, Poland, Hungary, and Czechoslovakia agreed to these terms, however Bulgaria and Romania did not, and many political officials throughout the Eastern bloc prevented the 'market liberalization' policies from being implemented at the CMEA level. The inability for member countries to reach a consensus about economic reforms coupled with the desire to create 'dynamics of dissent' within the Council against the USSR contributed to a lack of planning coordination by the CMEA throughout the decade.

In the 1970s, the CMEA adopted a few initiatives in order to continue economic growth and to modernize the economy. Firstly, the Eastern bloc heavily imported technology from the West in order to modernize, increasing the debt of the Eastern Bloc to the West dramatically. In 1971, the CMEA introduced the 'complex program', designed to promote further trade integration. This integration plan heavily relied on countries specializing in the production of certain goods and services, and parallel initiatives were discouraged and to be avoided. For instance, Hungary specialized in the manufacturing of buses for local and long-distance transport, which encouraged other member countries to trade with Hungary in order to acquire them.

However, the economic problems of the Eastern bloc continued to increase as reforms failed to pass and specialization efforts failed to incentivize states to improve their products. This resulted in economic growth which paled in comparison to that of the West. In a study assessing the technical efficiency of two Eastern bloc countries (Hungary, Poland) from the 1970s to the 1980s and comparing it to that of developed and developing countries, it was found that the two European socialist countries were less efficient than both developed and developing countries, and this efficiency gap had only widened in the years of analysis. It was seen that Hungary was more efficient than Poland at this time. The raw material subsidies (Molotov Plan) that the Soviet Union had provided since the 1950s were drastically reduced to the point of insignificance by the end of the 1980s, due to Eastern bloc countries having to buy industrial goods at a higher price than what was offered on the global market. The lack of support from the USSR as well as the lack of political consensus over reforms only hastened the decline of the CMEA.

=== Advantages ===
From a neoclassical perspective, there are two theoretical advantages to Soviet-type economic planning: the elimination of inflation, and the elimination of unemployment.

Firstly, complete price stability is achievable because of the state's control over setting prices and the money supply. To maintain a fixed currency value, all the state has to do is balance the total value of goods available during a given planning period with the amount of wages it pays according to the following equation, where $P$ represents the general retail price level, $Q$ accounts for the quantity of consumer goods and services, $Y$ is total household income (wages paid), $\mathit{TP}$ is transfer payments, $S$ is household saving, and $T$ is direct household taxes:
$$P\times Q=Y+\mathit{TP}-S-T$$

In practice, the USSR suffered from both open and repressed inflation throughout its history, the latter becoming especially pronounced in the second half of the 1980s.

The second advantage is the ability to eliminate unemployment (with the exception of frictional unemployment) and business cycles. Since the state is effectively the sole business proprietor and controls banking, it theoretically avoids classic financial frictions and consumer confidence challenges. Because the state makes labor compulsory and can run enterprises at a loss, full employment is a theoretical possibility even when capital stocks are too low to justify it in a market system. This was an advantage that the USSR arguably realized by 1930, although critics argue that sometimes certain segments of Soviet labor exhibited zero productivity, meaning that although workers were on employment rolls, they essentially sat idle because of capital deficiencies, i.e. there was employed unemployment.

Those scholars who reject the neoclassical viewpoint consider the benefits of the communist state planning system that the USSR itself adduced. One is the ability to control for externalities directly in the pricing mechanism. Another is the total capture of value obtained in the communist state planning system, which is neglected in market economies. By this, it is meant that while a worker might put in a certain amount of work to produce a good, a market might value that good at less than the cost of labor the worker put in, effectively negating the value of the work done. Because in the communist state planning system, prices are set by the state, the system avoids this pitfall by never pricing an item below its labor value. While these do seem to be valid theoretical advantages to the communist state planning system (especially under a Marxist–Leninist framework), it has been argued by some that STP, as implemented by the USSR, failed to achieve these theoretical possibilities.

Under the model of STP, during the 5 Year Plans, the USSR was able to rapidly industrialise and modernise their industry. The growth of GDP per Capita in the USSR in this period exceeded some Western countries. Planning led to high rates of capital accumulation, rapid GDP growth, and rising per capita consumption. Industrial production as a result of the 5 Year Plans was also rapid. During the first 5 Year Plan for example, Cast Iron production reportedly saw a 188%, going from 3,300,000 tonnes to 6,240,000 tonnes a year. In 1928, industrial output of electricity was 5,000,000,000 kW/h, rising to 13,000,000,000 kW/h by 1932, an increase of 270%. Industrial output of cars in the same time frame saw an increase of almost 3000%, rising from 0.8 pieces (in thousands) up to 23.9.

=== Disadvantages ===
From a neoclassical perspective, there were many disadvantages to the communist state planning system. They can be divided into two categories: macroeconomic and microeconomic.

Macroeconomic disadvantages included systemic undersupply, the pursuit of full employment at a steep cost, price fixing's devastating effect on agricultural incentives and the loss of the advantages of money because the communist state planning system eschews money's classic role. Additionally, planners had to aggregate many types of goods and inputs into a single material balance because it was impossible to create an individual balance for each of the approximately 24 million items produced and consumed in the USSR. This system introduced a strong bias towards underproduction, resulting in a scarcity of consumer goods. Another disadvantage is that while the communist state planning system does allow for the theoretically possibility of full employment, the USSR often achieved full employment by operating enterprises at a loss or leaving workers idle. There was always a Pareto superior alternative available to the USSR rather than full employment, specifically with the option to close some enterprises and make transfer payments to the unemployed.

The microeconomic disadvantages from a neoclassical perspective include the following:

- Encouragement of black-market activity because of fixed resource allocation.
- Low quality of Soviet goods induced by shielding them from world markets.
- The neglect of consumer need because of the challenge in measuring good quality.
- The tendency of enterprise-level Soviet managers to understate productive capacity in fear of the ratchet effect. This effect resulted from an enterprise overproducing in a given plan cycle. They would have to match their new level of higher production in the next cycle as the plan was adjusted to fit the new data.
- An anti-innovation bias (also from fear of the ratchet effect).
- Storming (shturmovshchina), i.e. the hurry to complete the plan at the end of a planning cycle resulting in poor production quality.
- Scattering of resources, i.e. excessive spread (raspylenie sredstv), where too many projects (especially construction) would have been started simultaneously and it took much longer to complete because of a lack of available inputs on time

Scholars who reject the neoclassical approach produce a shorter list of disadvantages, but because these disadvantages are valid even from the Soviet perspective, they are perhaps even more damning of the communist state planning system than those listed above. These scholars consider the communist state planning system's inability to predict things like weather, trade and technological advancement as an insurmountable drawback to the planning procedure. The communist state planning system's use of coercive techniques such as the ratchet effect and labor camps which are argued to be inherent to the communist state planning system on the one hand ensured the system's survival and on the other hand resulted in the distorted information that made effective planning challenging if not impossible. Lastly, these scholars argue that the semantic limitations of language made it impossible for the communist state planners to communicate their desires to enterprises in sufficient detail for planning to fully direct economic outcomes. Enterprises themselves under the communist state planning system still made a variety of economic decisions autonomously.

After the collapse of the USSR, other scholars have argued that a central deficiency of Soviet economic planning was that it was not premised on final consumer demand and that such a system would be increasingly feasible with advances in information technology.

== See also ==
- Eastern Bloc economies
- Economic planning
- Economy of the Soviet Union
- Five-year plans for the national economy of the Soviet Union
- Material balance planning
- OGAS
- Planned economy
- Project Cybersyn
- Socialist calculation debate
- Socialist economics
- State capitalism
- State socialism
- Administrative-command system
