= George Leggett (footballer) =

Australian rules footballer

Personal information
- Full name: George Richard Leggett
- Born: 14 July 1879; South Melbourne, Victoria
- Died: 28 April 1959 (aged 79); Hawthorn, Victoria

Playing career^{1}
Years	Club	Games (Goals)
1906	Geelong	2 (0)
- ^{1} Playing statistics correct to the end of 1906.

George Richard Leggett (14 July 1879 – 28 April 1959) was an Australian rules footballer who played with Geelong in the Victorian Football League (VFL).
