= Political revolution (Trotskyism) =

Trotskyist theoretical concept

A political revolution, in the Trotskyist theory, is an upheaval in which the government is replaced, or the form of government altered, but in which property relations are predominantly left intact. The revolutions in France in 1830 and 1848 are often cited as political revolutions.

Political revolutions are contrasted with social revolutions in which old property relations are overturned. Leon Trotsky's book, The Revolution Betrayed, is the most widely cited development of the theory.

== Origins ==
The movement advocates political revolution, as opposed to capitalist counter-revolution, in the countries with deformed workers states. Such political revolutions are envisioned to overthrow undemocratic governments of bureaucratic privilege, replacing them with governments based on workers' democracy while maintaining state-owned property relations.

Academics have identified certain factors that have mitigated the rise of political revolutions. Many historians have held that the rise and spread of Methodism in Great Britain prevented the development of a revolution there. In addition to preaching the Christian Gospel, John Wesley and his Methodist followers visited those imprisoned, as well as the poor and aged, building hospitals and dispensaries which provided free healthcare for the masses. The sociologist William H. Swatos stated that "Methodist enthusiasm transformed men, summoning them to assert rational control over their own lives, while providing in its system of mutual discipline the psychological security necessary for autonomous conscience and liberal ideals to become internalized, an integrated part of the 'new men' ... regenerated by Wesleyan preaching." The practice of temperance among Methodists, as well as their rejection of gambling, allowed them to eliminate secondary poverty and accumulate capital. Individuals who attended Methodist chapels and Sunday schools "took into industrial and political life the qualities and talents they had developed within Methodism and used them on behalf of the working classes in non-revolutionary ways." The spread of the Methodist Church in Great Britain, author and professor Michael Hill states, "filled both a social and an ideological vacuum" in English society, thus "opening up the channels of social and ideological mobility ... which worked against the polarization of English society into rigid social classes." The historian Bernard Semmel argues that "Methodism was an antirevolutionary movement that succeeded (to the extent that it did) because it was a revolution of a radically different kind" that was capable of effecting social change on a large scale.

== Application ==
While the Trotskyist movement does not recognize any political revolution to have occurred against the deformed worker's states, it saw a strong possibility for that potential in the Hungarian Revolution of 1956 and the Czechoslovak Prague Spring of 1968, both crushed by Soviet invasion. Many trotskyists see Valery Sablin's mutinity in 1975 as an example of a true socialist attempt to provoke a political revolution. Sablin thought that Leninism had been betrayed by the Soviet government, and started a mutinity in hopes of inspiring the soviet people to overthrow the current leadership and install true socialism. Another uprising seen to have the possibility of sweeping in the political revolution was the 1989 Tiananmen Square protests and massacre, crushed by the People's Liberation Army of the Chinese Communist Party.

Unlike the movements that led to capitalist counter-revolution such Boris Yeltsin's 1991 coup in the USSR and Lech Wałęsa's Solidarność in Poland, these previous movements were not seen as having stated capitalist goals and were not seen as hostile to socialism. As such the Trotskyist movement opposed the 1956 invasion of Hungary, the 1969 invasion of Czechoslovakia, and the Tiananmen Square massacre as the crimes of Stalinist governments.

While there is general agreement among Trotskyists on these questions regarding Hungary, Czechoslovakia, and China in events above, there is disagreement on questions regarding capitalist counter-revolution. Some Trotskyist groups cheered the fall of the Stalinist governments of the Soviet Union and Eastern Europe, even under the leadership of pro-capitalist forces. Arguments put forward by some of these groups included the idea that the mobilizations and political space created by smashing the Stalinist bureaucracy could bring about the ability of the working class to carry out the political revolution as a step towards creating a truly democratic and egalitarian socialist society.

Most Trotskyists hold on to the historic position of Leon Trotsky in advocating only Political Revolution against Stalinism while also standing for the defense of the deformed and degenerated workers' states from imperialism and internal capitalist counter-revolution. They argue that their position has been proven correct by the drop of the standard of living of the people of the former Soviet Union and Eastern Europe including the lack of medical care and jobs. Internationally they point to the strengthened hand of U.S. Imperialism with the fall of the Soviet Union as a major cause of war, including the Anglo-American war in Iraq.

Today these debates continue regarding what some Trotskyists consider the deformed workers' states of the Republic of Cuba, the Democratic People's Republic of Korea, the Socialist Republic of Vietnam, the Lao People's Democratic Republic and the People's Republic of China.

== See also ==
- OTPOR!
- Degenerated workers' state
- Bureaucratic collectivism
- State capitalism
- New class
- State socialism
- Statism
