= Bureaucratic collectivism =

Theory of class society

Bureaucratic collectivism is a theory of class society. It is used by some leftists to describe the nature of the Soviet Union under Joseph Stalin and other similar states in Central and Eastern Europe and elsewhere (such as North Korea).

== Theory ==
A bureaucratic collectivist state owns the means of production, while the surplus or profit is distributed among an elite party bureaucracy (nomenklatura), rather than among the working class. Also, it is the bureaucracy—not the workers, or the people in general—which controls the economy and the state. Thus, the system is not truly socialist, but it is not capitalist either. In Trotskyist theory, it is a new form of class society which exploits workers through new mechanisms. Theorists, such as Yvan Craipeau, who hold this view believe that bureaucratic collectivism does not represent progress beyond capitalism—that is, that it is no closer to being a workers' state than a capitalist state would be, and is considerably less efficient. Some social democrats even believe that certain kinds of capitalism, such as social democratic capitalism, are more progressive than a bureaucratic collectivist society.

George Orwell's famous novel Nineteen Eighty-Four describes a fictional society of "oligarchical collectivism". Orwell was familiar with the works of James Burnham, having reviewed Burnham's The Managerial Revolution prior to writing Nineteen Eighty-Four. Oligarchical collectivism was a fictionalized conceptualization of bureaucratic collectivism, where Big Brother and the Inner Party form the nucleus of a hierarchical organization of society professing itself as "English socialism" because of its revolutionary origins, but afterwards only concerned with total domination by the Party.

The idea has also been applied to Western countries outside the Eastern Bloc, as a regime necessary to institute in order to maintain capitalism and keep it from disintegrating in the post-war era. This different form of bureaucratic collectivism is supposed to integrate various sectors of society, such as labor unions, corporations, and government organizations, in order to keep contradictions in the economy from developing into a general meltdown. This form is supposedly embodied in the welfare state, which organizes workers into a government network subsumed under capitalist relations.

== Theoretical origins ==
"Bureaucratic collectivism" was first used as a term to describe a theory originating in England, shortly before the First World War, about a possible future social organisation. After the war, the Russian Revolution, and the rise to power of Joseph Stalin in the Soviet Union, Hugo Urbahns and Lucien Laurat both began to critique the nature of the Soviet state in a similar manner.

This theory was first taken up within Trotskyism by a small group in France around Craipeau. It was also taken up by Bruno Rizzi, who believed that the Soviet, German, and Italian bureaucracies were progressive and celebrated "the class which has the courage to make itself master of the state". It was with Rizzi that Leon Trotsky debated in the late 1930s. Trotsky held that the Soviet Union was a degenerated workers state and that if it did not undergo a new workers' political revolution, it could move towards a new form of society, such as bureaucratic collectivism. However, Trotsky doubted that a state of pure bureaucratic collectivism would ever be reached; he believed that, in the absence of a proletarian revolution to return the Soviet Union to socialism, a comprehensive counter-revolution would return the nation to capitalism instead.

Soon after the Workers Party in the United States (later the Independent Socialist League), led by Max Shachtman, split from the Fourth International, it adopted the theory of bureaucratic collectivism and developed it. As a result, it is often associated with Left Shachtmanism and the Third Camp. Its version had much in common with Craipeau's, as developed by James Burnham and Joseph Carter, but little with Rizzi's.

== Criticism ==
In 1948, Tony Cliff argued that it is difficult to make a critique of bureaucratic collectivism because authors such as Shachtman never actually published a developed account of the theory. He asserted that the theoretical poverty of the theory of bureaucratic collectivism is not accidental and tried to show that the theory is only negative; empty, abstract, and therefore arbitrary. Cliff proposed state capitalism as an alternative theory that more accurately describes the nature of the Soviet Union under Stalinism.

In a 1979 Monthly Review essay, Ernest Mandel argued that the hypothesis that the Soviet bureaucracy is a new class does not correspond to a serious analysis of the real development and the real contradictions of Soviet economy and society in the last fifty years. He asserted that conflict of interest turns bureaucracy into a cancer on a society in transition between capitalism and socialism. Accordingly, bureaucratic management is not only increasingly wasteful but it also prevents the system of a planned economy based upon socialized property from operating effectively. Mandel concluded that this undeniable fact is in itself incompatible with the characterization of the bureaucracy as a ruling class and with the USSR as a new "exploitative mode of production" whose "laws of motion" have never been specified.

A related concept is a "command administrative" system within what sociologist Michael Kennedy called "Communist-governed state socialism". In Has Socialism Failed, the late South African Communist Party leader Joe Slovo referred to the problems associated with a party having "administrative command", stating "post-apartheid state power must clearly vest in the elected representatives of the people and not, directly or indirectly, in the administrative command of a party."

== See also ==
- Deformed workers' state
- Degenerated workers' state
- Kleptocracy
- New class
- Oligarchy
- Soviet bureaucracy
- State capitalism
- State socialism
