= The Theory and Practice of Oligarchical Collectivism =

Fictional book in George Orwell's novel Nineteen Eighty-Four

The Theory and Practice of Oligarchical Collectivism is a fictional book in George Orwell's 1949 dystopian novel Nineteen Eighty-Four. It is supposedly written by Emmanuel Goldstein, the principal enemy of the state of Oceania's ruling party. The Party portrays Goldstein as a former member of the Inner Party who conspired to depose Big Brother and overthrow the government. In the novel, the protagonist, Winston Smith, obtains the banned book from O'Brien, an apparent friend. It is also simply referred to as "the book".

Orwell modelled Goldstein on Leon Trotsky; Goldstein's book was a parody of Trotsky's 1937 critique of the Soviet Union entitled The Revolution Betrayed. Orwell was also influenced by the theory of bureaucratic collectivism popular in the late 1930s, particularly the writings of American philosopher James Burnham, a former Trotskyist. His 1941 book The Managerial Revolution predicts the emergence of three superstates being at war for world domination. This inspired Orwell's own description of the three fictional superstates that form the basis of the political geography of Nineteen Eighty-Four.

Goldstein's book reveals to Winston the structure, hierarchy and philosophy of Oceania and the motivations of its ruling Party. Orwell received some criticism for interrupting the narrative flow of Nineteen-Eighty Four by placing Goldstein's book at the heart of his novel, but its lengthy thesis provides the ideological and theoretical bases for Oceania's totalitarian regime.

== Role in Nineteen Eighty-Four ==
In Nineteen Eighty-Four, the protagonist, Winston Smith, writes a diary in which he confesses thought crimes, specifically his secret hatred of Big Brother and the Party. In the course of his work at the Ministry of Truth, Winston approaches O'Brien, a member of the Inner Party, believing him to be part of the Brotherhood, Goldstein's conspiracy against Oceania. Initially, O'Brien appears as such, especially in arranging to give Winston a copy of "the book", the possession of which is a death sentence in Oceania. In conversation, O'Brien tells Winston that it reveals the true, totalitarian nature of the dystopian society that The Party established in Oceania and that full membership to the Brotherhood requires reading it. Winston describes it as a "heavy black volume" with an inscription on the title-page:

THE THEORY AND PRACTICE OF
OLIGARCHICAL COLLECTIVISM
by
Emmanuel Goldstein

Winston manages to read chapters one and three of Goldstein's book, titled "Ignorance is Strength" and "War is Peace", which are two of the contradictory party slogans promoted on the facade of the Ministry of Truth, the remaining slogan being "Freedom is Slavery". His attempt to join the Brotherhood by reading the book fails when he is arrested by the Thought Police. O'Brien, who had posed as a Brotherhood member to gain his trust, casts in doubt the truthfulness of the book when he reveals that it was written by the Inner Party rather than Goldstein, but confirms that its description of the regime is accurate.

The term Oligarchical Collectivism refers to Ingsoc, the dominant ideology of Oceania and the ideologies of Neo-Bolshevism in Eurasia and Death-worship (Obliteration of the Self) in Eastasia. Winston reads two long excerpts of the book establishing how the three totalitarian superstates – Eastasia, Eurasia, Oceania – emerged from a global war, thus connecting the past to his present, the year 1984. It explains the basic political philosophy of the totalitarianism that derived from the authoritarian political tendencies manifested in the Twentieth century. That the three, ostensibly opposing ideologies are functionally identical is the central revelation of "the book".

Orwell essentially organised Nineteen-Eighty Four into three sections. The first section introduces Oceania from the protagonist's viewpoint, depicting the methods the totalitarian regime uses to control its population, including the Thought Police, telescreens and party political slogans. In this section, Winston, who has only vague memories, attempts to uncover the past through various methods. In the second section, Winston reads a couple of chapters from Goldstein's book, which explains the ideological and theoretical bases for the regime, but he is still unclear about the motives of the regime. Only in the third part of the novel does he finally learn this after he is arrested and tortured by O'Brien. Initially, Winston believes that the masses are being ruled for their own good, but O'Brien explains that, "The Party seeks power entirely for its own sake". O'Brien further explains that the inevitable future resulting from this lust for power is "a boot stamping on a human face - forever".

By reading excerpts from Goldstein's book, Winston learns that the main principles of Oceania's totalitarian regime are its dependency on the mutability of the past and the use of doublethink. His reading is interrupted before he can finally learn the full revelation of the Party's secret, which is revealed by O'Brien much later in the novel. O'Brien's explanation is that God is power. The slogan "Freedom is Slavery" defines the Party's immortality and that only by completely submitting to the collective Party does an individual become all-powerful and immortal.

== Background ==
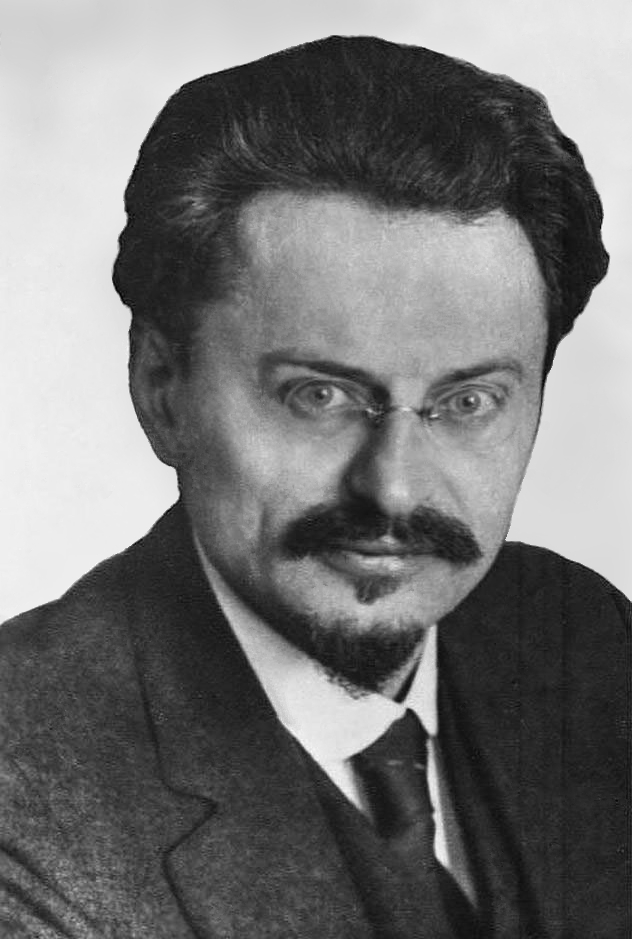
Orwell modelled the character of Emmanuel Goldstein on Leon Trotsky (pictured), one of the leaders of the Bolshevik revolution.

Oceania's principal enemy of the people, Emmanuel Goldstein, is modelled after Leon Trotsky, a former member of the inner circle of the Bolshevik Party whom Joseph Stalin purged and then declared an enemy of the people of the Soviet Union, the socialist state that Trotsky had helped found in Russia. Dorian Lynskey also found similarities to Andreu Nin, the leader of the POUM who was assassinated by the NKVD while Orwell was fighting for the POUM in Barcelona during the Spanish Civil War.

The book has been described as a parody and critique of The Revolution Betrayed (1937), by Trotsky; and The Managerial Revolution (1941), by James Burnham, a former Trotskyist. Theoretically, Oligarchical Collectivism recalls the theory of bureaucratic collectivism, a term used by the Italian political theorist Bruno Rizzi, who published a book titled The Bureaucratisation of the World in September 1939. It was read by Trotsky, who in November 1939, published an article criticising the book in a journal titled The New International. Rizzi argued that the Soviet Union under Stalin exploited its workers and was neither capitalist nor socialist but was an emerging bureaucratic autocracy that would dominate the world. Trotsky believed that Marxists should continue to support the Soviet Union, but many in America disagreed. James Burnham rejected Marxism completely and wrote The Managerial Revolution after reading Trotsky's summary of Rizzi's book. He agreed that power was falling into the hands of executives of corporations and government administrators and predicted three superstates that would in the future be in conflict for world domination. Orwell was a keen reader of Burnham's book and it was influential on his description of the three totalitarian superstates in Nineteen Eighty-Four.

From the late 1930s Orwell had been struggling to understand the relationship between communism, fascism and capitalism and, after reading Assignment in Utopia by Eugene Lyons, he felt that Stalinism did not seem very different to fascism. In The Totalitarian Enemy, Franz Borkenau presented Nazism and Stalinism as two sides of the same system. In his 1940 review of Borkenau, Orwell anticipated the title of Goldstein's book by writing: "The two regimes, having started from opposite ends, are rapidly evolving towards the same system— a form of oligarchical collectivism."

Orwell was concerned that totalitarianism would result in the abandonment of objective truth and the distortion of history in which a leader could control both the future and the past. In a BBC talk in June 1941, he stated: "Totalitarianism has abolished freedom of thought to an extent unheard of in any previous age... [It] isolates you from the outside world, it shuts you up in an artificial universe in which you have no standards of comparison." In a letter written to H. J. Willmett in May 1944, he wrote that history had already ceased to exist: "if the sort of world that I am afraid of arrives, a world of two or three great superstates which are unable to conquer one another, two and two could become five if the führer wished it".

In his essay titled "You and the Atomic Bomb", published in the Tribune on 19 October 1945, he repeated his concerns, writing: "When James Burnham wrote The Managerial Revolution it seemed probable to many Americans that the Germans would win the European end of the war, and it was therefore natural to assume that Germany and not Russia would dominate the Eurasian land mass, while Japan would remain master of East Asia. This was a miscalculation, but it does not affect the main argument. For Burnham’s geographical picture of the new world has turned out to be correct. More and more obviously the surface of the earth is being parcelled off into three great empires, each self-contained and cut off from contact with the outer world, and each ruled, under one disguise or another, by a self-elected oligarchy."

From a literary perspective, Orwell was deeply influenced by the writings of H. G. Wells, whose books had been a major presence in his childhood. Dorian Lynskey viewed Goldstein's book as a response and rejection of Well's utopian vision of the future. In The Road to Wigan Pier (1937) Orwell wrote about the socialist world being ordered and efficient, "But it is precisely from that vision of the future as a sort of glittering Wells-world that sensitive minds recoil."

== Contents ==
Goldstein's book represents Orwell's growing concerns about totalitarianism and his vision that modern states are driven towards power for its own sake rather than for improvements to society. It details the perpetual class struggle characteristic of human societies; beginning with the observation that societies have always divided themselves into three social classes: the High, the Middle and the Low and that their aims are irreconcilable. The High aims to remain in power, the Middle aims to change places with the High and the Low desires equality. Goldstein writes that no progress has ever changed this division. Goldstein's theory presents a development from Orwell's earlier works like Animal Farm in his theory of the totalitarian state. In Goldstein's thesis, the Middle, which displaces the High, becomes tyrannical and openly hostile to equality, using language like Ingsoc or "English socialism" to give the impression of equality. Goldstein writes that by the 1940s, all political thought in any name is authoritarian and hierarchical.

Oligarchical collectivism: The Oceanian social-class pyramid in the year 1984.

Goldstein explains the structure and philosophy of Oceania and its opposition to liberal ideas in the pursuit of power. Although Ingsoc is an abbreviation of English socialism, it has no real ideology, because its sole purpose is to retain power controlled by a managerial elite. The Inner Party, consisting of politicians, intellectuals and scientists, makes up two percent of the population. Below this elite, the Outer Party, consisting of bureaucratic functionaries make up about twelve percent. The remaining 85 percent of the population in the hierarchy are the proles.

Initially the Party justifies its control by its dedication to socialist values, presenting itself as a collectivist regime. Oligarchical collectivism means that property is owned by a small group rather than individual Party members. The Party itself is a meritocracy, rather than a hereditary system, as its longevity depends on the continuation of policy. Party members are recruited as a result of their competence and the Party's absolute power is maintained by the Thought Police.

The Inner Party fears the Outer Party rather than the Proles as they have lost everything and have no future. The Party, through the Ministry of Truth, practices historical revisionism, which robs the Proles of a past, making them incapable of revolution. In order to prevent any unorthodoxy, the Ministry of Truth uses Newspeak, which makes heresy impossible by omitting words that could express it. Newspeak also reduces thought to simple opposites, such as good and "ungood", an intentional dichotomy that hides nuance and ambiguity while promoting black and white thinking. Inner Party members are further subject to self-deceptive habits of mind, such as crimestop which halts thinking at the threshold of politically dangerous thought, and doublethink, which allows simultaneously holding and believing contradictory thoughts.

Goldstein's writing on science and technology in Oceania presents Orwell's rejection of the idea that technical advances equate to progress. He had previously written the belief that all scientific advances led to nationalism and dictatorship. Goldstein writes that science and progress had failed as it: "depended on the empirical habit of thought, which could not survive in a strictly regimented society. As a whole the world today is more primitive than it was fifty years ago."

Goldstein's book also explains the geographical relationships of the three superstates, Oceania, Eurasia and Eastasia. It explains that the three are in an infinite war and that their frontiers are constantly shifting. Orwell writes that their regimes are essentially the same: "Everywhere there is the same pyramidal structure, the same worship of semi-divine leader, the same economy existing by and for continuous warfare". Their citizens are immobile, having no contact with foreigners and no opportunity to uncover the lies inside the sealed state in which they exist. Each superstate has the technological capability to destroy their counterparts in a theoretical single, decisive strike, but none of the superstates are a true threat to each other. To counter overproduction and maintain power, they must exist in a state of permanent limited war. By harnessing the hysteria of war and demand for self-sacrifice, each of the superstates declares war not on each other but on their own populace, who are kept ignorant, on the brink of starvation, and overworked. Permanent limited war allows the ruling party to explain the lack of consumer goods and justify its oppression of the masses. This explains the ironic Party slogan that "War is Peace".

== Critical response ==
Orwell received criticism from critics and publishers for interrupting the narrative of Nineteen Eighty Four by adding a lengthy fictional thesis in the centre of the novel, but insisted that its placement and length be maintained. Erika Gottlieb agreed that the section is indispensable for the novel's function as a dystopian satire. She writes that Goldstein's book provides both an analysis of the political trends of the 1940s and a warning of the possibility of a looming political crisis as depicted in the totalitarian regime of Oceania. Dorian Lynskey did not find Orwell's treatment of the proles to be credible, stating that the regime could not maintain absolute control over the population with 85% being beyond the influence of doublethink or the Thought Police. He felt that the proles were instead a caricature of capitalism in contrast to the Party's totalitarianism. Nineteen Eighty-Four was described by Ben Pimlott as "a non-fiction essay about the demon power". He drew parallels between the novel and Goldstein's book in its political analysis, citing Winston's response to its reading, "The best books, he perceived, are those that tell you what you know already." Tom Shippey found no plausibility in O'Brien's ability or desire to write and distribute Goldstein's book and stated that it merely acts as a "captain's log", a literary device used by Orwell to provide the protagonist with a method of understanding his universe. In the opinion of H. Mark Roelofs, Orwell was more of a political philosopher than a novelist. He pointed to the characters' lack of development outside the novel's political purpose and noted that its emotional pace is disrupted by the political theorising in Goldstein's book.

== Impact and influence ==
In parallel to the banning of Goldstein's secret book within the fictional world of Oceania, Nineteen Eighty-Four was also banned in Communist Poland. The Polish-American Nobel Prize-winning poet Czesław Miłosz, who had experienced Stalinisation as a cultural official, wrote in his book The Captive Mind (1953), "Few have become acquainted with Orwell’s 1984; because it is both difficult to obtain and dangerous to possess, it is known only to certain members of the Inner Party. Orwell fascinates them through his insight into details they know well, and through his use of Swiftian satire. Such a form of writing is forbidden by the New Faith because allegory, by nature manifold in meaning, would trespass beyond the prescriptions of socialist realism and the demands of the censor. Even those who know Orwell only by hearsay are amazed that a writer who never lived in Russia should have so keen a perception into its life."
