= The New Class =

The New Class may refer to:

- New class, or new class; term for the ruling class of Soviet states
- The New Class: An Analysis of the Communist System, 1957 book by Milovan Djilas
- BMW New Class (German: Neue Klasse), a series of cars no longer produced

== See also ==
- Middle class, the newest class and between lower class and upper class
- New (disambiguation)
- Class (disambiguation)
- Saved by the Bell: The New Class (TV series), school sitcom
- Paranormal State: The New Class (TV series), paranormal docudrama pilot and spin-off of Paranormal State
- The New Classmate or Nil Battey Sannata, a 2016 Indian Hindi-language drama film by Ashwiny Iyer Tiwari
