= State capitalism =

Ownership or control of an economy by a government

State capitalism is an economic system in which the state undertakes business and commercial economic activity and where the means of production are nationalized as state-owned enterprises (including the processes of capital accumulation, centralized management and wage labor). The definition can also include the state dominance of corporatized government agencies (agencies organized using business-management practices) or of public companies (such as publicly listed corporations) in which the state has controlling shares. The term has been used as a pejorative by Marxists, liberals and neoliberals. However, it has also served as a programmatic label for developmentalist and neomercantilist projects in reaction to imperialism.

A state-capitalist country is one where the government controls the economy and essentially acts as a single huge corporation, extracting surplus value from the workforce in order to invest it in further production. This designation applies regardless of the political aims of the state, even if the state is nominally socialist. Some scholars argue that the economy of the Soviet Union and of the Eastern Bloc countries modeled after it, including Maoist China, were state capitalist systems, and Eastern and Western commentators alike assert that the current economies of China and Singapore also constitute a mixture of state-capitalism with private capitalism.

The label "state capitalism" is used by various authors in reference to a private capitalist economy controlled by a state, i.e. a private economy that is subject to economic planning and interventionism. It has also been used to describe the controlled economies of the Great Powers during World War I (1914–1918). Alternatively, state capitalism may refer to an economic system where the means of production are privately owned, but the state has considerable control over the allocation of credit and investment. This was the case with Western European countries during the post-war consensus and with France during the period of dirigisme after World War II. Other examples include Singapore under Lee Kuan Yew and Turkey, as well as military dictatorships during the Cold War and fascist regimes such as Nazi Germany.

The phrase "state capitalism" has also come to be used (sometimes interchangeably with "state monopoly capitalism") to describe a system where the state intervenes in the economy to protect and advance the interests of large-scale businesses (sometimes pejoratively called crony capitalism). Noam Chomsky, a libertarian socialist, applies the term "state capitalism" to the economy of the United States, where large enterprises that are deemed by "the powers that be" as "too big to fail" receive publicly-funded government bailouts that mitigate the firms' assumption of risk and undermine market laws, and where private production is largely funded by the state at public expense, but private owners reap the profits. This practice is contrasted with the ideals of both socialism and laissez-faire capitalism.

There are various theories and critiques of state capitalism, some of which existed before the Russian October Revolution of 1917. The common themes among them identify that the workers do not meaningfully control the means of production and that capitalist social relations and production for profit still occur within state capitalism, fundamentally retaining the capitalist mode of production. In Socialism: Utopian and Scientific (1880), Friedrich Engels argued that state ownership does not do away with capitalism by itself, but rather would be the final stage of capitalism, consisting of ownership and management of large-scale production and communication by the bourgeois state. He argued that the tools for ending capitalism are found in state capitalism. In Imperialism, the Highest Stage of Capitalism (1916), Lenin claimed that World War I had transformed laissez-faire capitalism into monopolist state capitalism.

== Origins and early usage ==
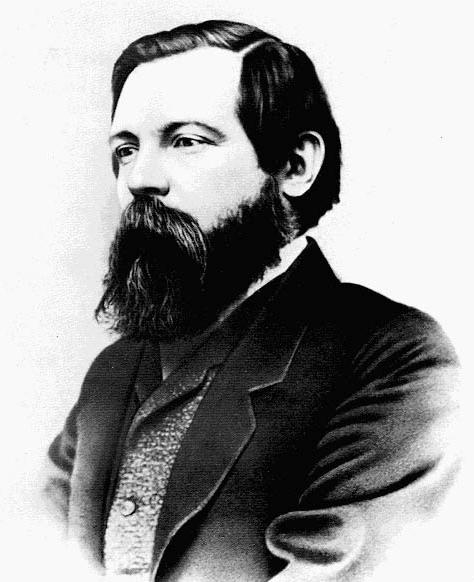
Friedrich Engels, who argued that state ownership does not do away with capitalism by itself

In Socialism: Utopian and Scientific (1880), Friedrich Engels described state ownership, i.e. state capitalism, as follows:

If the crisis revealed the incapacity of the bourgeoisie any longer to control the modern productive forces, the conversion of the great organizations for production and communication into joint-stock companies and state property shows that for this purpose the bourgeoisie can be dispensed with. All the social functions of the capitalists are now carried out by salaried employees. The capitalist has no longer any social activity save the pocketing of revenues, the clipping of coupons, and gambling on the stock exchange, where the different capitalists fleece each other of their capital. Just as at first the capitalist mode of production displaced the workers, so now it displaces the capitalists, relegating them to the superfluous population even if not in the first instance to the industrial reserve army.

Engels argued that the tools for ending capitalism are found in state capitalism, further writing:

But neither the conversion into joint stock companies nor into state property deprives the productive forces of their character as capital. In the case of joint-stock companies this is obvious. And the modern state, too, is only the organization with which bourgeois society provides itself in order to maintain the general external conditions of the capitalist mode of production against encroachments either by the workers or by individual capitalists. The modern state, whatever its form, is then the state of the capitalists, the ideal collective body of all the capitalists. The more productive forces it takes over as its property, the more it becomes the real collective body of the capitalists, the more citizens it exploits. The workers remain wage-earners, proletarians. The capitalist relationship isn't abolished; it is rather pushed to the extreme. But at this extreme it is transformed into its opposite. State ownership of the productive forces is not the solution of the conflict, but it contains within itself the formal means, the key to the solution.

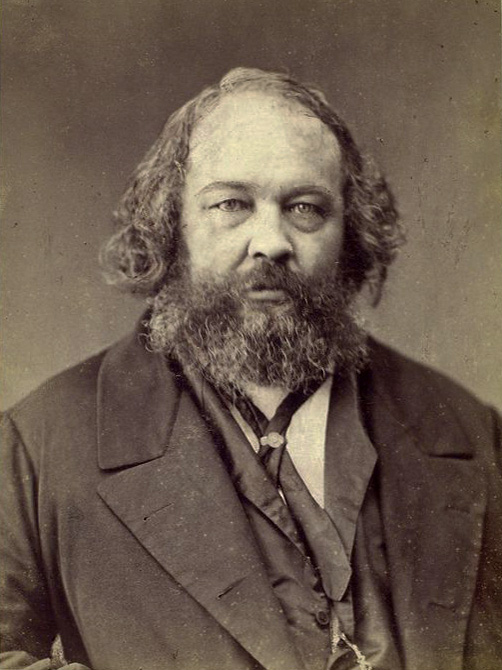
Mikhail Bakunin, who criticized state socialism as state capitalism, predicting that if the Marxists were successful in seizing power, they would create a party dictatorship

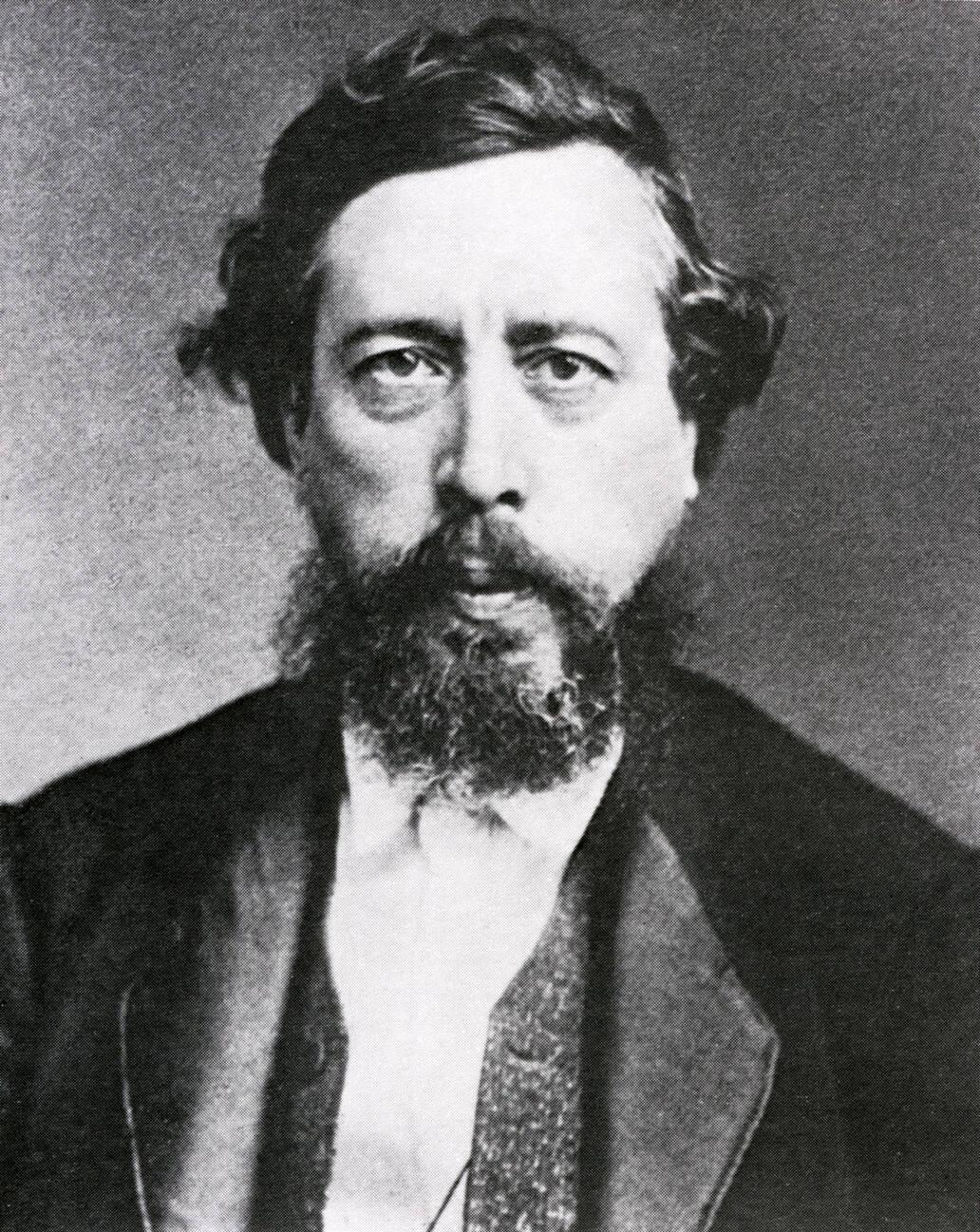
Wilhelm Liebknecht, who criticized Otto von Bismarck's State Socialism policy as being "really State capitalism"

Engels described state capitalism as a new form or variant of capitalism. In 1896, following Engels, the German Social Democrat Wilhelm Liebknecht said: "Nobody has combated State Socialism more than we German Socialists; nobody has shown more distinctively than I that State Socialism is really State capitalism."

It has been suggested that the concept of state capitalism can be traced back to Mikhail Bakunin's critique during the First International of the potential for state exploitation under Marxist-inspired socialism, or to Jan Wacław Machajski's argument in The Intellectual Worker (1905) that socialism was a movement of the intelligentsia as a class, resulting in a new type of society he termed state capitalism. For anarchists, state socialism is equivalent to state capitalism, hence oppressive and merely a shift from private capitalists to the state being the sole employer and capitalist.

In Imperialism, the Highest Stage of Capitalism and Imperialism and World Economy, both Vladimir Lenin and Nikolai Bukharin, respectively, had similarly identified the growth of state capitalism as one of the main features of capitalism in its imperialist epoch. In The State and Revolution, Lenin wrote that "the erroneous bourgeois reformist assertion that monopoly capitalism or state-monopoly capitalism is no longer capitalism, but can now be called "state socialism" and so on, is very common". During World War I, using Lenin's idea that tsarism was taking a Prussian path to capitalism, the Bolshevik Nikolai Bukharin identified a new stage in the development of capitalism in which all sectors of national production and all important social institutions had become managed by the state—he termed this new stage state capitalism. After the October Revolution, Lenin used the term state capitalism positively. In spring 1918, during a brief period of economic liberalism prior to the introduction of war communism and again during the New Economic Policy (NEP) of 1921, Lenin justified the introduction of state capitalism controlled politically by the dictatorship of the proletariat to further central control and develop the productive forces, making the following point:

Reality tells us that state capitalism would be a step forward. If in a small space of time we could achieve state capitalism, that would be a victory.

Lenin argued the state should temporarily run the economy which would eventually be taken over by workers. To Lenin, state capitalism did not mean the state would run most of the economy, but that state capitalism would be one of five elements of the economy:

State capitalism would be a step forward as compared with the present state of affairs in our Soviet Republic. If in approximately six months' time state capitalism became established in our Republic, this would be a great success and a sure guarantee that within a year socialism will have gained a permanently firm hold.

=== By the left ===
As a term and concept, state capitalism has been used by various socialists, including anarchists, Marxists, Leninists, left communists, Marxist–Leninists and Trotskyists.

==== Anarchists ====
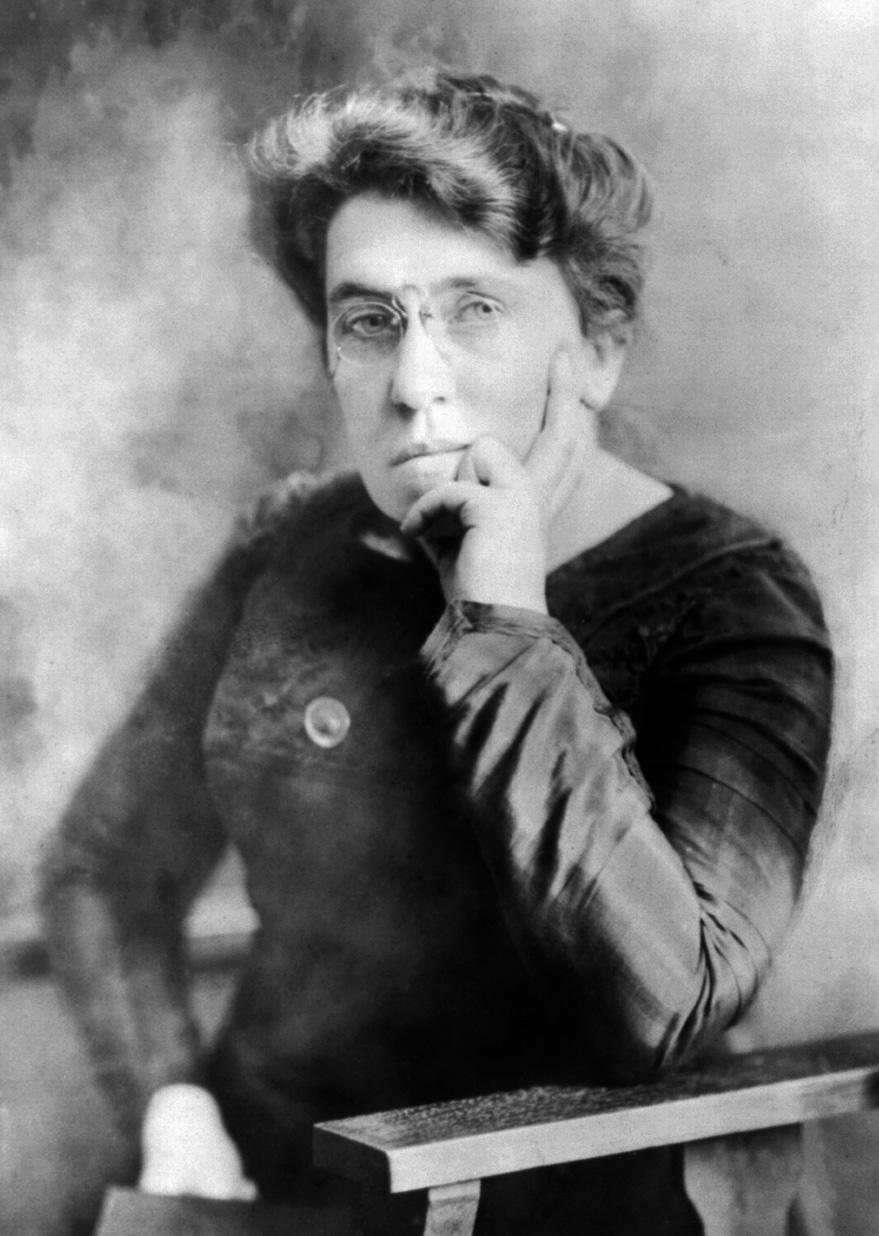
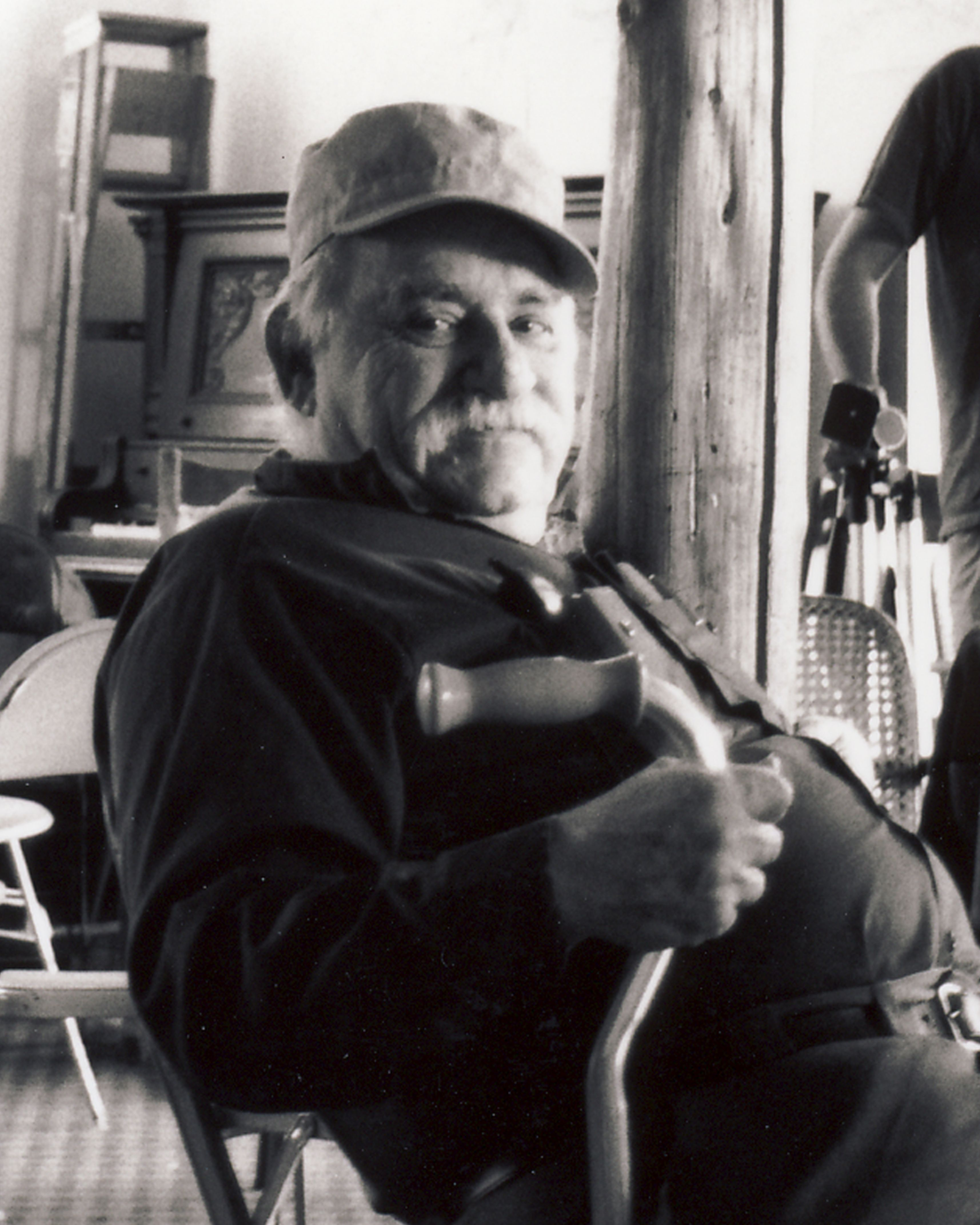
Emma Goldman (left) and Murray Bookchin (right) were two prominent anarchists who argued that the Soviet Union was state capitalist and criticized the Bolsheviks for it.

Perhaps the earliest critique of the Soviet Union as state capitalist was formulated by the Russian anarchists as documented in Paul Avrich's work on Russian anarchism.

The Russian anarchists' claim would become standard in anarchist works. Of the Soviet Union, the prominent anarchist Emma Goldman wrote an article from 1935 titled "There Is No Communism in Russia" in which she argued:

Such a condition of affairs may be called state capitalism, but it would be fantastic to consider it in any sense Communistic [...] Soviet Russia, it must now be obvious, is an absolute despotism politically and the crassest form of state capitalism economically.

When speaking about Marxism, Murray Bookchin said the following:

Marxism, in fact, becomes ideology. It is assimilated by the most advanced forms of state capitalist movement — notably Russia. By an incredible irony of history, Marxian 'socialism' turns out to be in large part the very state capitalism that Marx failed to anticipate in the dialectic of capitalism. The proletariat, instead of developing into a revolutionary class within the womb of capitalism, turns out to be an organ within the body of bourgeois society [...] Lenin sensed this and described 'socialism' as 'nothing but state capitalist monopoly made to benefit the whole people'. This is an extraordinary statement if one thinks out its implications, and a mouthful of contradictions.

While speaking about Leninism, the authors of An Anarchist FAQ say:

Rather than present an effective and efficient means of achieving revolution, the Leninist model is elitist, hierarchical and highly inefficient in achieving a socialist society. At best, these parties play a harmful role in the class struggle by alienating activists and militants with their organisational principles and manipulative tactics within popular structures and groups. At worst, these parties can seize power and create a new form of class society (a state capitalist one) in which the working class is oppressed by new bosses (namely, the party hierarchy and its appointees).

==== Classical and orthodox Marxists ====
Immediately after the Russian Revolution, many Western Marxists questioned whether socialism was possible in Russia. Specifically, Karl Kautsky said:

It is only the old feudal large landed property which exists no longer. Conditions in Russia were ripe for its abolition but they were not ripe for the abolition of capitalism. Capitalism is now once again celebrating a resurrection, but in forms that are more oppressive and harrowing for the proletariat than of old.

Instead of assuming higher industrialised forms, private capitalism has assumed the most wretched and shabby forms of black marketeering and money speculation. Industrial capitalism has developed to become state capitalism. Formerly state officials and officials from private capital were critical, often very hostile towards each other.

Consequently the working man found that his advantage lay with one or the other in turn. Today the state bureaucracy and capitalist bureaucracy are merged into one—that is the upshot of the great socialist revolution brought about by the Bolsheviks. It constitutes the most oppressive of all despotisms that Russia has ever had to suffer.

After 1929, exiled Mensheviks such as Fyodor Dan began to argue that Stalin's Russia constituted a state capitalist society. In the United Kingdom, the orthodox Marxist group the Socialist Party of Great Britain independently developed a similar doctrine. Although initially beginning with the idea that Soviet capitalism differed little from western capitalism, they later began to argue that the bureaucracy held its productive property in common, much like the Catholic Church's. As John O'Neill notes:

Whatever other merits or problems their theories had, in arguing that the Russian revolution was from the outset a capitalist revolution they avoided the ad hoc and post hoc nature of more recent Maoist- and Trotskyist-inspired accounts of state capitalism, which start from the assumption that the Bolshevik revolution inaugurated a socialist economy that at some later stage degenerated into capitalism.

Writing in the Menshevik journal Socialist Courier on 25 April 25, Rudolf Hilferding rejected the concept of state capitalism, noting that as practiced in the Soviet Union it lacked the dynamic aspects of capitalism such as a market which set prices or a set of entrepreneurs and investors which allocated capital. According to Hilferding, state capitalism was not a form of capitalism, but rather a form of totalitarianism.

==== Communist left and council communists ====
Another early analysis of the Soviet Union as state capitalist came from various groups advocating left communism. One major tendency of the 1918 Russian communist left criticised the re-employment of authoritarian capitalist relations and methods of production. As Valerian Osinsky in particular argued, "one-man management" (rather than the democratic factory committees workers had established and Lenin abolished) and the other impositions of capitalist discipline would stifle the active participation of workers in the organisation of production. Taylorism converted workers into the appendages of machines and piece work imposed individualist rather than collective rewards in production so instilling petty bourgeois values into workers. In sum, these measures were seen as the re-transformation of proletarians within production from collective subject back into the atomised objects of capital. The working class, it was argued, had to participate consciously in economic as well as political administration. In 1918, this tendency within the left communists emphasized that the problem with capitalist production was that it treated workers as objects. Its transcendence lay in the workers' conscious creativity and participation, which is reminiscent of Marx's critique of alienation.

This type of criticism was revived on the left of the Russian Communist Party after the 10th Congress in 1921, which introduced the New Economic Policy (NEP). Many members of the Workers' Opposition and the Decists (both later banned) and two new underground left communist groups, Gavril Myasnikov's Workers' Group and the Workers' Truth group, developed the idea that Russia was becoming a state capitalist society governed by a new bureaucratic class. The most developed version of this idea was in a 1931 booklet by Myasnikov.

The left and council communist traditions outside Russia consider the Soviet system as state capitalist, although some left communists such as Amadeo Bordiga also referred to it as simply capitalism or capitalist mode of production. Otto Rühle, a major German left communist, developed this idea from the 1920s and it was later articulated by Dutch council communist Anton Pannekoek in "State Capitalism and Dictatorship" (1936).

==== Trotskyists ====
Leon Trotsky stated that the term state capitalism "originally arose to designate the phenomena which arise when a bourgeois state takes direct charge of the means of transport or of industrial enterprises" and is therefore a "partial negation" of capitalism.

However, Trotsky rejected that description of the Soviet Union, claiming instead that it was a degenerated workers' state. After World War II, most Trotskyists accepted an analysis of the Soviet bloc countries as being deformed workers' states. However, alternative opinions within the Trotskyist tradition have developed the theory of state capitalism as a new class theory to explain what they regard as the essentially non-socialist nature of the Soviet Union, Cuba, China and other self-proclaimed socialist states.

The discussion goes back to internal debates in the Left Opposition during the late 1920s and early 1930s. Ante Ciliga, a member of the Left Opposition imprisoned at Verkhne-Uralsk in the 1930s, described the evolution of many within the Left Opposition to a theory of state capitalism influenced by Gavril Myasnikov's Workers Group and other left communist factions.

Following his release and his return to activity in the International Left Opposition, Ciliga "was one of the first, after 1936, to raise the theory [of state capitalism] in Trotskyist circles". George Orwell, who was an anti-Stalinist leftist like Ciliga, used the term in his Homage to Catalonia (1938).

After 1940, dissident Trotskyists developed more theoretically sophisticated accounts of state capitalism. One influential formulation has been that of the Johnson–Forest Tendency of C. L. R. James and Raya Dunayevskaya, who formulated her theory in the early 1940s on the basis of a study of the first three Five Year Plans alongside readings of Marx's early humanist writings. Their political evolution would lead them away from Trotskyism.

The first British Trotskyist to expound the idea of state capitalism was Ryan Worrall in his essay 'USSR: Proletarian or Capitalist State?', which was published in both the Socialist Review and Modern Quarterly in 1939. Worrall's article drew international attention and elicited a response from Rudolf Hilferding. Another proponent was Tony Cliff, associated with the International Socialist Tendency and the British Socialist Workers Party (SWP), dating back to the late 1940s. Unlike Johnson–Forest, Cliff formulated a theory of state capitalism that would enable his group to remain Trotskyists, albeit heterodox ones. A relatively recent text by Stephen Resnick and Richard D. Wolff, titled Class Theory and History, explores what they term state capitalism in the former Soviet Union, continuing a theme that has been debated within Trotskyist theory for most of the past century.

Other terms used by critical left-wing theorists in discussing Soviet-style societies include bureaucratic collectivism, deformed workers' states, degenerated workers' states and the "new class".

==== Maoists and anti-revisionist Marxist–Leninists ====
In the common program set up by the Chinese People's Political Consultative Conference in 1949, in effect the country's interim constitution, state capitalism meant an economic system of corporatism. It provided as follows: "Whenever necessary and possible, private capital shall be encouraged to develop in the direction of state capitalism".

From 1956 to the late 1970s, the Chinese Communist Party (CCP) and their Maoist or anti-revisionist adherents around the world often described the Soviet Union as state capitalist, essentially using the accepted Marxist definition, albeit on a different basis and in reference to a different span of time from either the Trotskyists or the left-communists. Specifically, the Maoists and their descendants use the term state capitalism as part of their description of the style and politics of Nikita Khrushchev and his successors as well as to similar leaders and policies in other self-styled "socialist" states. This was involved in the ideological Sino–Soviet split.

After Mao Zedong's death, amidst the supporters of the Cultural Revolution and the Gang of Four, most extended the state capitalist formulation to China itself and ceased to support the CCP which likewise distanced itself from these former fraternal groups. The related theory of Hoxhaism was developed in 1978, largely by Socialist Albanian President Enver Hoxha, who insisted that Mao himself had pursued state capitalist and revisionist economic policies.

Most current communist groups descended from the Maoist ideological tradition still adopt the description of both China and the Soviet Union as being state capitalist from a certain point in their history onwards—most commonly, the Soviet Union from 1956 to its collapse in 1991 and China from 1976 to the present. Maoists and anti-revisionists also sometimes use the term social imperialism to describe socialist states that they consider to be actually capitalist in essence—their phrase, "socialist in words, imperialist in deeds" denotes this.

=== By liberal economists ===
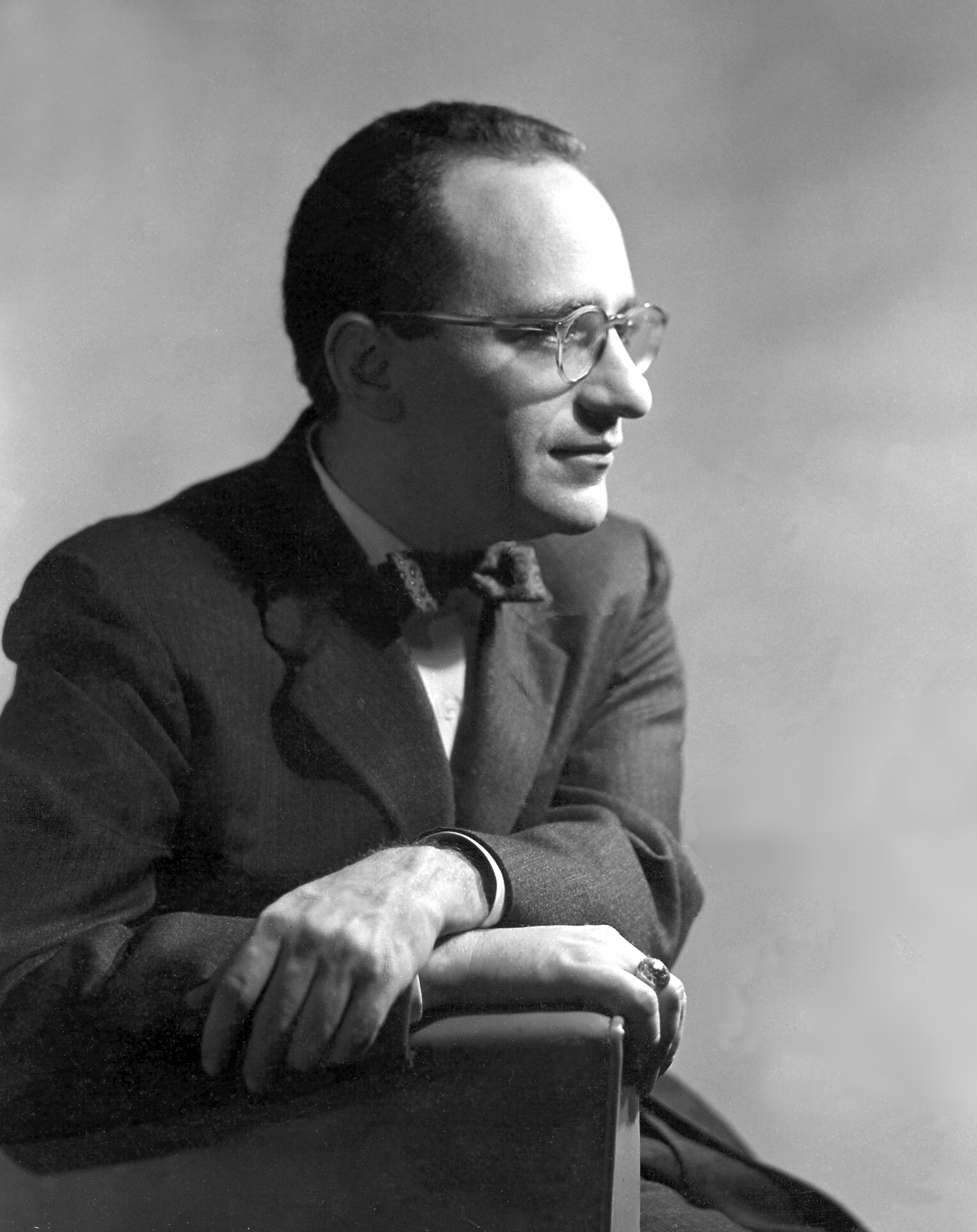
Murray Rothbard, who advanced a right-libertarian analysis of state capitalism

Murray Rothbard, an anarcho-capitalist philosopher, used the term state capitalism interchangeably with the term state monopoly capitalism and used it to describe a partnership of government and big business in which the state intervenes on behalf of large capitalists against the interests of consumers.

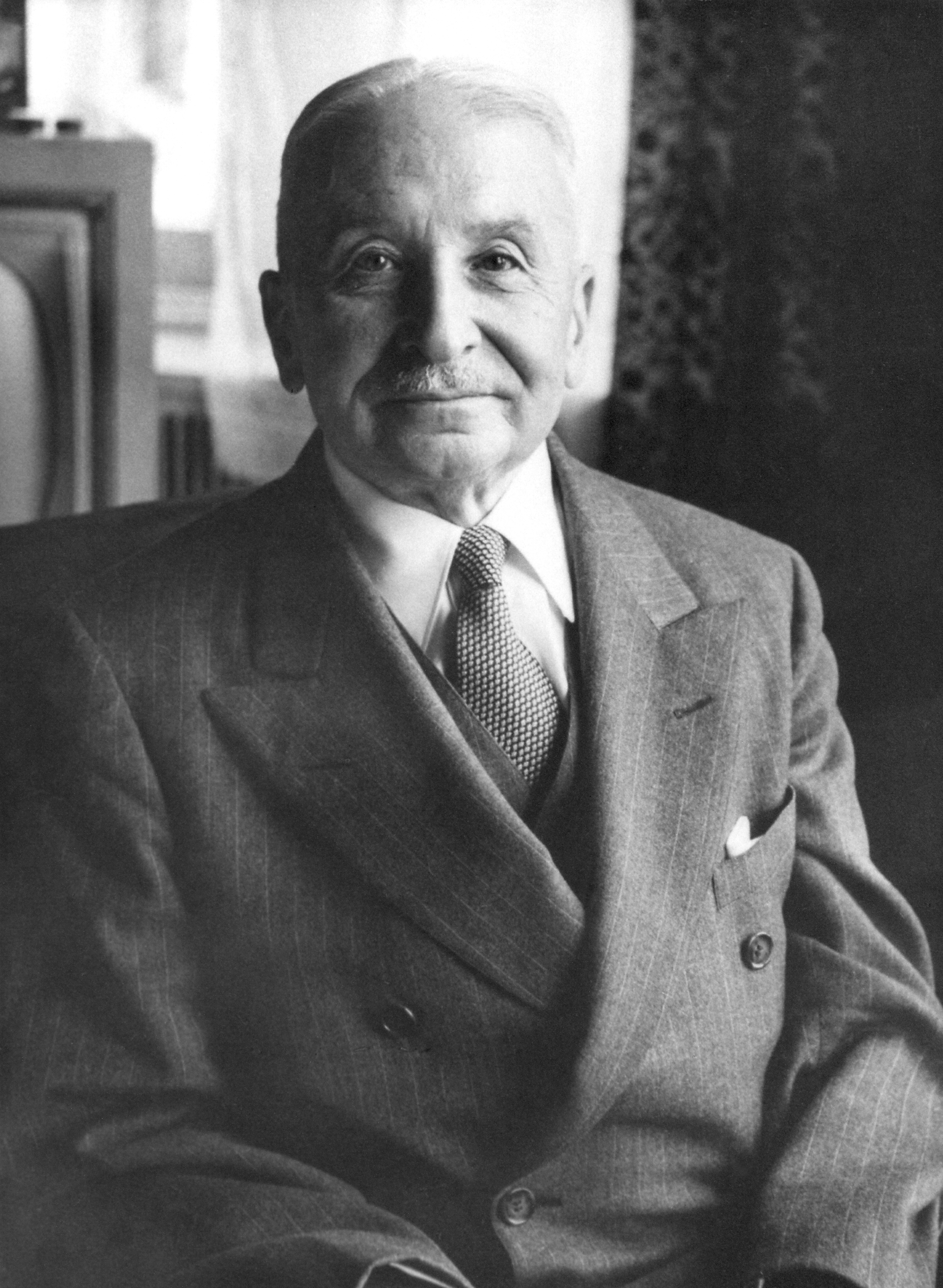
Ludwig von Mises, who described state capitalism as a form of state socialism

Rothbard distinguished it from laissez-faire capitalism, where big business is not protected from market forces. This usage dates from the 1960s, when Harry Elmer Barnes described the post-New Deal economy of the United States as "state capitalism". More recently, Andrei Illarionov, former economic adviser to Russian President Vladimir Putin, resigned in December 2005, protesting Russia's "embracement of state capitalism".

The term state capitalism is not used by classical liberals to describe the public ownership of the means of production. The explanation why was given by the Austrian School economist Ludwig von Mises, who argued:

The socialist movement takes great pains to circulate frequently new labels for its ideally constructed state. Each worn-out label is replaced by another which raises hopes of an ultimate solution of the insoluble basic problem of Socialism — until it becomes obvious that nothing has been changed but the name. The most recent slogan is "State Capitalism." It is not commonly realized that this covers nothing more than what used to be called Planned Economy and State Socialism, and that State Capitalism, Planned Economy, and State Socialism diverge only in non-essentials from the "classic" ideal of egalitarian Socialism.

=== By Italian Fascists ===
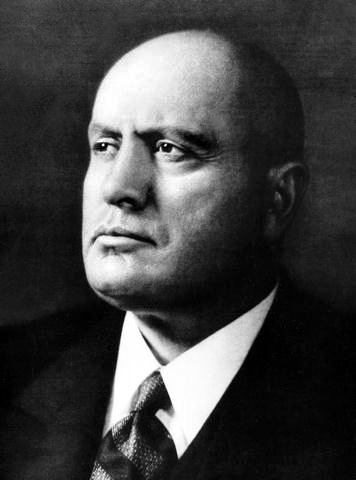
Benito Mussolini, who claimed that the modern phase of capitalism is state socialism "turned on its head"

On economic issues, Italian Fascist leader Benito Mussolini claimed in 1933 that were Fascism to follow the modern phase of capitalism, its path would "lead inexorably into state capitalism, which is nothing more nor less than state socialism turned on its head. In either event, [whether the outcome be state capitalism or state socialism] the result is the bureaucratization of the economic activities of the nation".

Mussolini claimed that capitalism had degenerated in three stages, starting with dynamic or heroic capitalism (1830–1870), followed by static capitalism (1870–1914) and then reaching its final form of decadent capitalism, also known as supercapitalism beginning in 1914.

Mussolini denounced supercapitalism for causing the "standardization of humankind" and for causing excessive consumption. Mussolini claimed that at this stage of supercapitalism "[it] is then that a capitalist enterprise, when difficulties arise, throws itself like a dead weight into the state's arms. It is then that state intervention begins and becomes more necessary. It is then that those who once ignored the state now seek it out anxiously". Due to the inability of businesses to operate properly when facing economic difficulties, Mussolini claimed that this proved that state intervention into the economy was necessary to stabilize the economy.

Mussolini claimed that dynamic or heroic capitalism and the bourgeoisie could be prevented from degenerating into static capitalism and then supercapitalism only if the concept of economic individualism were abandoned and if state supervision of the economy was introduced. Private enterprise would control production, but it would be supervised by the state. Italian Fascism presented the economic system of corporatism as the solution that would preserve private enterprise and property while allowing the state to intervene in the economy when private enterprise failed.

== In Western countries and European studies ==
An alternate definition is that state capitalism is a close relationship between the government and private capitalism such as one in which the private capitalists produce for a guaranteed market. An example of this would be the military–industrial complex in which autonomous entrepreneurial firms produce for lucrative government contracts and are not subject to the discipline of competitive markets.

Both the Trotskyist definition and this one derive from discussion among Marxists at the beginning of the 20th century, most notably Nikolai Bukharin, who in his book Imperialism and World Economy thought that advanced, imperialist countries exhibited the latter definition and considered (and rejected) the possibility that they could arrive at the former.

State capitalism is practised by a variety of Western countries with respect to certain strategic resources important for national security. These may involve private investment as well. A government may own or even monopolize oil production or transport infrastructure to ensure availability in the case of war. Examples include Neste, Equinor and OMV.

There are limits according to arguments that state capitalism exists to ensure that wealth creation does not threaten the ruling elite's political power which remains unthreatened by tight connections between the government and the industries while state capitalist fears of capitalism's creative destruction, the threat of revolution and any significant changes in the system result in the persistence of industries that have outlived their economic usefulness and an inefficient economic environment that is ill-equipped to inspire innovation.

Several European scholars and political economists have used the term to describe one of the three major varieties of capitalism that prevail in the modern context of the European Union. This approach is mainly influenced by Schmidt's (2002) article on The Futures of European Capitalism, in which she divides modern European capitalism in three groups, namely market, managed and state. Here, state capitalism refers to a system where high coordination between the state, large companies and labour unions ensures economic growth and development in a quasi-corporatist model.

The author cites France and to a lesser extent Italy as the prime examples of modern European state capitalism. A general theory of capitalist forms, whereby state capitalism is a particular case, was developed by Ernesto Screpanti, who argued that Soviet-type economies of the 20th century used state capitalism to sustain processes of primitive accumulation. In their historical analysis of the Soviet Union, Marxist economists Richard D. Wolff and Stephen Resnick identify state capitalism as the dominant class system throughout the history of the Soviet Union.

=== State monopoly capitalism ===
The theory of state monopoly capitalism was initially a neo-Stalinist doctrine popularised after World War II. The term refers to an environment where the state intervenes in the economy to protect large monopolistic or oligopolistic businesses from competition by smaller firms.

The main principle of the ideology is that big business, having achieved a monopoly or cartel position in most markets of importance, fuses with the government apparatus. A kind of financial oligarchy or conglomerate therefore results, whereby government officials aim to provide the social and legal framework within which giant corporations can operate most effectively. This is a close partnership between big business and government, and it is argued that the aim is to integrate labour-unions completely in that partnership.

State monopoly capitalist (stamocap) theory aims to define the final historical stage of capitalism following monopoly capitalism, consistent with Lenin's definition of the characteristics of imperialism in his short pamphlet of the same name. Occasionally the stamocap concept also appears in neo-Trotskyist theories of state capitalism as well as in libertarian anti-state theories. The analysis made is usually identical in its main features, but very different political conclusions are drawn from it.

==== Political implications ====
The strategic political implication of stamocap theory towards the end of the Joseph Stalin era and afterwards was that the labour movement should form a people's democratic alliance under the leadership of the communist party with the progressive middle classes and small business against the state and big business (called monopoly for short). Sometimes this alliance was also called the anti-monopoly alliance. At the 1965 Afro-Asian Conference, delivered at the Second Economic Seminar of Afro-Asian Solidarity in Algeri, Che Guevara argued that "[e]ver since monopoly capital took over the world, it has kept the greater part of humanity in poverty, dividing all the profits among the group of the most powerful countries. The standard of living in those countries is based on the extreme poverty of our countries".

==== Criticism ====
When Eugen Varga introduced the theory, orthodox Stalinist economists attacked it as incompatible with the doctrine that state planning was a feature only of socialism and that "under capitalism anarchy of production reigns".

Critics of the stamocap theory (e.g. Ernest Mandel and Leo Kofler) claimed the following:

- Stamocap theory wrongly implied that the state could somehow overrule inter-capitalist competition, the laws of motion of capitalism and market forces generally, supposedly cancelling out the operation of the law of value.
- Stamocap theory lacked any sophisticated account of the class basis of the state and the real linkages between governments and elites. It postulated a monolithic structure of domination which in reality did not exist in that way.
- Stamocap theory failed to explain the rise of neoliberal ideology in the business class, which claims precisely that an important social goal should be a reduction of the state's influence in the economy.
- Stamocap theory failed to show clearly what the difference was between a socialist state and a bourgeois state, except that in a socialist state the communist party, or rather its central committee, played the leading political role. In that case, the class-content of the state itself was defined purely in terms of the policy of the ruling political party or its central committee.

== Current forms in the 21st century ==
State capitalism is distinguished from capitalist mixed economies where the state intervenes in markets to correct market failures or to establish social regulation or social welfare provisions in the following way: the state operates businesses for the purpose of accumulating capital and directing investment in the framework of either a free market or a mixed-market economy. In such a system, governmental functions and public services are often organized as corporations, companies or business enterprises.

In the state capitalism of the twenty-first century, the domestic and global aspects are more closely linked. In such a context, the state's intervention in the economy is associated with the strategy of countries to attain international prominence. Models of state capitalist strategies can be identified as a countries' endeavor to gain greater international political power by integrating domestic economic policies with foreign policy. Governments have been utilizing successful national corporations (national champions) to pursue mergers and acquisitions abroad, thereby enhancing their influence in various sectors of the global market.

=== People's Republic of China ===
Many analysts assert that China is one of the main examples of state capitalism in the 21st century. In his book The End of the Free Market, political scientist Ian Bremmer describes China as the primary driver for the rise of state capitalism as a challenge to the free market economies of the developed world, particularly in the aftermath of the 2008 financial crisis. Bremmer draws a broad definition of state capitalism as such:

In this system, governments use various kinds of state-owned companies to manage the exploitation of resources that they consider the state's crown jewels and to create and maintain large numbers of jobs. They use select privately owned companies to dominate certain economic sectors. They use so-called sovereign wealth funds to invest their extra cash in ways that maximize the state's profits. In all three cases, the state is using markets to create wealth that can be directed as political officials see fit. And in all three cases, the ultimate motive is not economic (maximizing growth) but political (maximizing the state's power and the leadership's chances of survival). This is a form of capitalism but one in which the state acts as the dominant economic player and uses markets primarily for political gain.

Following on Bremmer, Aligica, and Tarko further develop the theory that state capitalism in countries like modern day China and Russia is an example of a rent-seeking society. They argue that following the realization that the centrally planned socialist systems could not effectively compete with capitalist economies, formerly Communist Party political elites are trying to engineer a limited form of economic liberalization that increases efficiency while still allowing them to maintain political control and power.

In his article "We're All State Capitalists Now", British historian and Laurence A. Tisch Professor of History at Harvard University Niall Ferguson warns against "an unhelpful oversimplification to divide the world into 'market capitalist' and 'state capitalist' camps. The reality is that most countries are arranged along a spectrum where both the intent and the extent of state intervention in the economy vary". He then notes: "The real contest of our time is not between a state-capitalist China and a market-capitalist America, with Europe somewhere in the middle. It is a contest that goes on within all three regions as we all struggle to strike the right balance between the economic institutions that generate wealth and the political institutions that regulate and redistribute it."

In the common program set up by the Chinese People's Political Consultative Conference in 1949, in effect the country's interim constitution, state capitalism meant an economic system of corporatism. It provided as follows: "Whenever necessary and possible, private capital shall be encouraged to develop in the direction of state capitalism."

Analysis of the Chinese model and the socialist market economy by the economists Julan Du and Chenggang Xu finds that the contemporary economic system of the People's Republic of China represents a state capitalist system as opposed to a market socialist system. The reason for this categorization is the existence of financial markets in the Chinese economic system, which are absent in the market socialist literature and in the classic models of market socialism; and that state profits are retained by enterprises rather than being equitably distributed among the population in a basic income/social dividend or similar scheme, which are major features in the market socialist literature. They conclude that China is neither a form of market socialism nor a stable form of capitalism.

The Chinese government maintains that these reforms are actually the primary stage of socialism and the Chinese Communist Party (CCP) remains nominally dedicated to establishing a socialist society and subsequently developing into full communism. This was reiterated by General Secretary of the Chinese Communist Party Xi Jinping at the 2023 G20 New Delhi summit.

=== Taiwan ===
Some Taiwanese economists referred to Taiwan's economic model during the Kuomintang period as party-state capitalism. During this era, Taiwan's economy had been classified as a state capitalist system influenced by its Leninist model of political control. Today, Taiwan's economy includes a number of state-owned enterprises, but the state's role in the economy has shifted from that of an entrepreneur to a minority investor in companies alongside the democratization agenda of the late 1980s.

=== Norway ===
According to The Economist, Norway is "embracing state capitalism", as the government of Norway, funded by the government's ownership of the country's oil reserves, has ownership stakes in many of the country's largest publicly listed companies, owning 37% of the Oslo stock market and operates the country's largest non-listed companies including Avinor and Statkraft. There are legal limits however, as the Government Pension Fund of Norway is not allowed to own more than 15% of any single Norwegian company.

=== Singapore ===
Singapore has attracted some of the world's most powerful corporations through business-friendly legislation and through the encouragement of Western-style corporatism, with close cooperation between the state and corporations. Singapore's large holdings of government-linked companies and the state's close cooperation with business are defining aspects of the economy of Singapore. Singapore's government owns controlling shares in many government-linked companies and directs investment through sovereign wealth funds, an arrangement that has been cited as state capitalism when defined as "system in which the state functions as the leading economic actor and uses markets primarily for political gain". Listed companies in which the government is the controlling shareholder account for 37% of the total stock market capitalization in Singapore.

=== United States ===
During the second presidency of Donald Trump beginning in 2025, Trump sought an unprecedented amount of control over US business, publicly attacked companies and their executives, demanded firings of corporate leaders who criticized or contradicted him, and demanded cuts of business profits by the federal government. Trump abandoned traditional Republican orthodoxy about protecting and promoting the free market, and sought greater and more direct government control over private business which was widely described by academics, economists, commentators, and former corporate CEOs as an embrace of state capitalism.

His agreements with NVIDIA and AMD to provide the government with 15% of their overseas chip sales to China were described by critics as a "shakedown" and as potentially illegal and unconstitutional. In an unprecedented move, the Pentagon became the largest shareholder of MP Materials, bypassing US procurement and contracting laws in the process. As part of an agreement to allow Japan-based Nippon Steel to buy US Steel, Trump was granted a personal, not governmental, golden share in US Steel, allowing him to influence board decisions and maintain veto power over certain decisions set to expire at the end of his presidential term, after which the Treasury and Commerce Departments would exercise control under all future presidents. Intel agreed to grant the government a 10% equity stake in its company with no power to influence board decisions "with limited exceptions" in what NBC News described as "the president's latest extraordinary move to exert federal government control over private business".

Writing for Columbia Law Review in 2020, Jon D. Michaels argued that there was growing evidence of government market participation in a "postliberal" political economy, coining the term "public capitalism" in the United States at the national, state, and local levels.

== See also ==
- Authoritarian socialism
- Chiangism
- Christian finance
- Collective capitalism
- Communist state
- Constitutional economics
- Corporate capitalism
- Corporatization
- Crony capitalism
- Developmental state
- Distributism
- East Asian model of capitalism
- Economics of fascism
- Gaullism
- Indicative planning
- List of socialist states
- Mercantilism
- Mixed economy
- Ordoliberalism
- Political capitalism
- Political economy
- Preussentum und Sozialismus
- Reform and opening up
- Rentier state
- Rhine capitalism
- Social market economy
- State-owned enterprise
- Statism
- Tiger Cub Economies
- Tripartism
- Types of capitalism
