= Soviet bureaucracy =

1917–1991 Russian organization

The Soviet bureaucracy played a crucial role in the governance and administration of the USSR. A class of high-ranking party bureaucrats, known as the nomenklatura, formed a de facto elite, wielding immense power over public life.

== Description ==
Harvard historian Richard Pipes suggests the Soviet nomenklatura system reflected a continuation of the old Tsarist regime, as many former chinovniks or "careerists" joined the Bolshevik government during and after the Russian Civil War of 1917–1922. Citing Soviet historian Sheila Fitzpatrick and sociologist Alena Ledeneva, academic and author Francis Spufford argues in Red Plenty that the Soviet bureaucracy differed from bureaucracy elsewhere in that "it was not predictable and rule-governed", but built upon the improvisations and personal dealings of individual state employees.

== History ==
Until the February Revolution of 1917, an extensive bureaucracy played a major role in the governance of Tsarist Russia. In 1722, the Table of Ranks were introduced by Peter the Great, which organised the Russian military, naval and civil services into a formal hierarchy. This created an administrative class called chinovniks.

In 1903, in To the Rural Poor, Vladimir Lenin wrote:

Just as the peasants were the slaves of the landlords, so the Russian people are still the slaves of the officials. Just as the peasants lacked civil freedom under the serf-owning system, so the Russian people still lack political liberty. Political liberty means the freedom of the people to arrange their public, state affairs.

Following the Bolshevik seizure of power, the Table of Ranks was abolished along with the institution of chinovniks. However, a new system of bureaucracy was quickly established, reluctantly falling back onto the expertise of the former tsarist civil servants. Lenin wrote that appointments to the civil service were to take into account: reliability, political attitude, qualifications, and administrative ability.

Joseph Stalin, general secretary of the party from 1922, became known as "Comrade File Cabinet" for his attention to the details of the party's appointments. In the early 1920s, Stalin was responsible for the development of the Central Committee's patronage system which he used to appoint his political supporters to prominent positions. Under the first Five Year Plan (1928-1932), the status and flexibility of civil servants was improved, although rigid central party control was retained. In 1935, the State Commission on the Civil Service was created with the goal of facilitating authority over the practices of state personnel. This was attached to the Commissariat of Finance, which exercised oversight over the commission.

Under Nikita Khrushchev, from 1953, the power of the party bureaucracy was strengthened as power that had previously been concentrated by Stalin into the hands of the Politburo was restored to the Central Committee. According to American Sovietologist Seweryn Bialer, following Leonid Brezhnev's accession to power in 1964, the appointment authority of the CPSU underwent a substantial expansion. However, in the late 1980s, under Mikhail Gorbachev, official statements suggest that the party actually intended to reduce its appointment authority.

== Criticism ==
In 1921, the Kronstadt rebels cited the dissolution of the bureaucratic institutions established by the Bolsheviks during the Civil War amongst their key demands, claiming the party had: "become bureaucratized, learned nothing, and not wanted to learn and to listen to the voice of the masses".

In 1922, a dying Lenin formed an alliance with Leon Trotsky against the growing party bureaucracy, which he believed to be at odds with the Marxist notion of the state "withering away". Following Lenin's death in 1924, and Stalin's subsequent rise to power, Trotsky developed a critical theory of the Soviet bureaucracy. In The Revolution Betrayed he wrote:

The fall of the present bureaucratic dictatorship, if it were not replaced by a new socialist power, would thus mean a return to capitalist relations with a catastrophic decline of industry and culture.

In 1957, Yugoslav politician Milovan Đilas, a prominent critic of Stalin, described the nomenklatura as the "new class" in his book The New Class: An Analysis of the Communist System. With the support the president of Yugoslavia, Josip Broz Tito, he argued that the Soviet bureaucracy had supplanted the earlier wealthy capitalist elites, enjoying special privileges and representing an "undemocratic force."

== See also ==
- Government of the Soviet Union
- Communist Party of the Soviet Union
- History of the Soviet Union (1927–1953)
- Nomenklatura
- Soviet democracy
