= Probable defeat =

Maoist theory

Probable defeat (Chinese: 可能失败) is a theory of the development of socialism held by Mao Zedong, holding that it is more likely that revisionism will result in the restoration of capitalism than socialism actually develop into communism.

== Background ==
Specifically arising after the De-Stalinization campaign pursued by Nikita Khrushchev, Mao pointed to what he saw as a full restoration of capitalism in the Soviet Union after the death of Joseph Stalin as evidence to how quickly socialism could be overthrown if the masses were not mobilized to fight against what Mao saw as the main root of potential capitalist restoration, the party itself. Instead of fearing the remnants of capitalist society most, Mao argued that under socialism the vanguard party could become parasitic and even declared the existence of a "bureaucratic class" that was working against the workers. This was a key inspiration behind the Cultural Revolution launched in 1966, with the warning finding appeal in the youth of China at the time, particularly among the student Red Guards who launched criticisms of members of the Chinese Communist Party itself.

== Concept ==
Unlike most adherents of historical materialism, Mao did not see socialism even as a likely development arising out of the development of capitalism. Instead, Mao claimed that "[m]ost probably revisionism will win out, and we will be defeated." The solution to this was to emphasize probable defeat, in order to keep the masses in a state of anxiety against capitalist elements. Mao told André Malraux, for example, that "[v]ictory is the mother of many illusions," referring specifically to the outcome of socialism.
