= Deformed workers' state =

Concept in Trotskyist political theory

In Trotskyist political theory, deformed workers' states are states where the capitalist class has been overthrown, the economy is largely state-owned and planned, but there is no internal democracy or workers' control of industry. In a deformed workers' state, the working class has never held political power like it did in Russia shortly after the Russian Revolution. These states are considered deformed because their political and economic structures have been imposed from the top (or from outside), and because revolutionary working class organizations are crushed. Like a degenerated workers' state, a deformed workers' state is considered to be a state that cannot be transitioning to socialism.

Most Trotskyists cite examples of deformed workers' states today as including Cuba, the People's Republic of China, North Korea and Vietnam. The Committee for a Workers' International and the Revolutionary Communist International have also included states such as Syria or Burma at times when they have had a nationalised economy.

== History ==
The concept of deformed workers' states was developed by the theorists of the Fourth International after World War II, when the Soviet Union had militarily defeated Nazi Germany and the Eastern Bloc had been created. Taking Leon Trotsky's concept of the Soviet Union as a degenerated workers' state, the 1951 Third World Congress of the International described the new regimes as deformed workers' states. Rather than advocating a social revolution, as in the capitalist countries, the Fourth International advocated political revolution to oust the Stalinist bureaucracy in the Soviet Union (which was degenerated) and in the buffer states.

This approach has been defended by the Trotskyist currents that trace their political continuity through the World Congresses between 1951 and 1965, such as the reunified Fourth International and CWI. The League for the Fifth International argues that the Eastern European states were degenerate workers states, in that they were "degenerate from birth" being qualitative degenerated rather than having quantitative deformations. Therefore, a political revolution would be needed.

Those Trotskyist currents that split from the Fourth International before 1948 over differences with Trotsky on the Soviet Union tend to disagree with this interpretation and have adopted theories describing the post-war Stalinist states as being state capitalist or bureaucratic collectivist.

Some Trotskyist groups such as Socialist Action, while having some disagreements with the Cuban leadership, consider Cuba a healthy workers' state. Others, such as the Freedom Socialist Party, say that the People's Republic of China has gone too far on the road of capitalist restoration to be considered a deformed workers' state.

== See also ==
- Grassroots dictatorship
- New class
- State socialism
- Statism
- Socialist-leaning countries
