= Westview Press =

American book publisher (1975–)

- Established: 1975 (51 years ago)
- Founders: Frederick A. Praeger
- Types: publisher, schoolbook publisher
- Legal status: joint-stock company
- Headquarters: Boulder, Boulder
- Country: United States
- Owners: Frederick A. Praeger
- Parent organisations: Taylor & Francis, Perseus Books Group, HarperCollins
- Website: www.perseusbooksgroup.com/westview/home.jsp

Westview Press was an American publishing company headquartered in Boulder, Colorado, founded by Frederick A. Praeger in 1975.

== Field of work ==
Westview primarily publishes textbooks.

== History ==
Praeger Publishing sold Westview in 1991 to SCS, who owned it until 1995, when it was purchased by HarperCollins. However, HarperCollins and Westview had difficulty working together due to very different corporate cultures and values.

Perseus bought Westview in March 1998 from HarperCollins.

In April 2016, Perseus Books Group's publishing operations, including Westview, were purchased by Hachette Book Group.

Hachette Book Group's Perseus Books Group division sold it to Taylor & Francis in 2017.

== Book series ==
=== Series published 1975–1990 (Frederick A. Praeger ) ===
- AAAS Selected Symposia Series
- Academy of Independent Scholars Forum Series
- Academy of Independent Scholars Retrospections Series
- Academy of Independent Scholars Retrospective Series
- African Modernization and Development Series
- American Casebook Series
- American History Series
- Ancient Peoples and Places Series
- Atlantic Council Policy Paperbacks
- The Atwater Series on the World Information Economy
- Conflict and Social Change Series
- Conservation of Human Resources Studies in the New Economy
- CSIS Energy Policy Series
- CSIS Significant Issues Series
- Development, Conflict and Social Change Series
- Dilemmas in World Politics
- Dimensions of Philosophy Series
- East-West Forum Publication Series
- East-West Monograph Series
- Educom Series in Computing and Telecommunications in Higher Education
- Encore Edition Series
- Energy Management Training Program Monograph Series
- Exeter Arabic and Islamic Series
- Feminist Theory and Politics Series
- Focus Series
- Foreign Relations of Latin America Series
- Frontiers in Physics
- Geographies of the United States
- Henry Rolfs Book Series of the Institute of Noetic Sciences
- IDA Monographs in Development Anthropology
- IADS Development-Oriented Literature Series
- Icon Editions Series
- IFES Research Series
- IFES Third World Series
- International Centre for Ethnic Studies Series
- International Economies Series
- International Perspectives on Security Series
- Interventions : Theory and Contemporary Politics
- The John M. Olin Critical Issues Series
- Latin American Perspectives Series
- The Language Library
- Mathematics Lecture Note Series
- Nations of the Modern World
- Occasional Paper Series
- Ocean Resources and Marine Policy Series
- Pacific and World Studies Series
- Persian Heritage Series (Bibliotheca Persica)
- Political Cultures Series
- Profiles: Nations of Contemporary Africa
- Profiles: Nations of the Contemporary Middle East
- Radicalism in the Contemporary Age
- Rural Studies Series
- Santa Fe Institute Series
- Santa Fe Institute Studies in the Sciences of Complexity
- Series in Political Economy and Economic Development in Latin America
- Social Behavior & Natural Resources Series
- Social Inequality Series
- Social Impact Assessment Series
- Studies in Ancient Art and Archaeology
- Studies in Global Security
- Studies in International and Strategic Affairs Series
- Studies in International Security Affairs and Military Strategy
- Studies in Physical Geography
- Transforming American Politics
- UN Science and Technology for Development Series
- West Bank Data Base Perspective Series
- Westview Library of Federal Departments, Agencies, and Systems
- Westview Replica Edition Series
- Westview Series on Social Inequality
- Westfield Special Studies
- Westview Special Studies in Applied Anthropology
- Westview Special Studies in Communications Series
- Westview Special Studies in Contemporary Social Issues
- Westview Special Studies in National Security and Defense Policy
- Westview Special Studies: Institute for Arctic and Alpine Research: Studies in High Altitude Geo-Ecology
- Westview Special Studies in International Economics and Business
- Westview Special Studies in International Relations
- Westview Special Studies in Military Affairs
- Westview Special Studies in Natural Resources and Energy Management
- Westview Special Studies in Science, Technology, and Public Policy
- Westview Special Studies on Africa Series
- Westview Special Studies on China and East Asia
- Westview Special Studies on Social, Political, and Economic Development
- Westview Special Studies on South and Southeast Asia
- Westview Special Studies on the Middle East Series
- Westview Studies in Insect Biology
- Westview Tropical Agriculture Series
- Winrock Development-Oriented Literature Series
- Women in Cross Cultural Perspective Series
