= Frederick A. Praeger (publisher) =

American publisher (1915–1994)

- Born: Frederick Amos Praeger; 16 September 1915; Vienna, Austria
- Died: 28 May 1994 (aged 78); Boulder, Colorado, United States
- Occupation: Publisher
- Known for: Founder of Frederick A. Praeger, Inc.
- Awards: Carey-Thomas Award (Publishers Weekly)

Frederick Amos Praeger (16 September 1915 – 28 May 1994) was an Austrian-born American publisher. In 1950, he founded Frederick A. Praeger, Inc., a "major Manhattan publishing house" whose books would include "art books and books about the Cold War, international affairs, and the military". The firm later became an imprint of ABC-Clio, which became an imprint of Bloomsbury Publishing in 2021.

== Early life and career ==
Frederick Amos Praeger was born in Vienna, Austria, on 16 September 1915. His parents were Maximilien "Max" Mayer Präger, an Austrian publisher and newspaper editor, and Mariem Präger (née Foerster). He was an only child.

From 1933 to 1938, he undertook studies in law and political science at the University of Vienna, and in 1934 he studied at the University of Paris. From 1935 to 1938, while pursuing his studies, he also worked in his father's publishing house, R. Loewit Verlag in Vienna.

In 1938, following the rise of Nazism in Austria and with the Praeger family, as Jews, finding itself under increasing threats, he was briefly imprisoned and then migrated to the United States. His parents, who remained behind, were murdered in the Holocaust.

== United States ==
Upon his arrival Praeger worked in numerous jobs ("lens grinder, soda jerk, gas station attendant") before becoming an American citizen in 1941 and serving in the U.S. Army in Europe during the Second World War and in the U.S. military government in Germany and in "various intelligence and editorial capacities" after the war's end.

== Frederick A. Praeger, Inc. ==
Returning to the United States, he founded a book-export business. In 1950, using borrowed money, he set up a Frederick A. Praeger Publishing, which would later be named Frederick A. Praeger, Inc. (later renamed Praeger Publishers) and a subsidiary firm, Inter Books, Inc.

His early publishing successes included several books by former Communists who had become disillusioned with the cause, including The New Class: An Analysis of the Communist System (1957) by the Yugoslav dissident, Milovan Djilas, The Naked God: The Writer and the Communist Party (1957) by Howard Fast, and One Day in the Life of Ivan Denisovich (1963) by Aleksandr Solzhenitsyn.

Praeger now turned to publishing art books, such as Picasso: A Study of his Work by Frank Elgar / A Biographical Study by Robert Maillard (1958), whose edition of 38,000 sold out, "an impressive achievement for an art book" and The Arts and Civilization of Angkor (1957) by Bernard-Phillippe Groslier. His firm contracted with the Whitney Museum to publish and distribute all of that institution's books.

During its existence Frederick A. Praeger, Inc. published more than 2,000 titles and issued many "outstanding" book series including the Praeger Paperbacks, the Praeger University Series, the Praeger World of Art Paperbacks/Series, the Praeger Publications in Russian History & World Communism, the Praeger Special Studies Series, and the Praeger Film Library.

In 1966 Praeger sold his firm to William B. Benton, an American senator and publisher and the chairman of the Encyclopaedia Britannica. In 1976 it was sold to CBS, which had shortened the name to Praeger Publishing before selling it to Greenwood Press, Inc. in 1986. When the renamed Greenwood Publishing Group (GPG) was acquired by ABC-Clio in 2009, Praeger Publishing became a standalone imprint of ABC-Clio, and remained such when, in December 2021, Bloomsbury Publishing bought ABC-Clio.

== Editor ==
During the 1960s and 1970s he also served in editorial and managerial roles with various British and American publishing firms, including Weidenfeld & Nicolson, London, the Phaidon Press, London, Phaidon Publishers, New York, and the Pall Mall Press, London. In the years 1968-1974 Praeger resided in Austria and worked with two Munich publishing firms: the Schuler Verlag and the Kunst Verlag Praeger.

== Westview Press ==
Having moved back to America, he founded the Westview Press in Boulder, Colorado in 1975, which specialised in "scholarly scientific and technical books" printed in inexpensive typewritten formats and issued without dust wrappers. This firm was sold to SCS Communications in 1989 and now owned by Taylor & Francis.

== Legacy ==
Praeger's publishing output benefited from the rising college library budgets in the United States from the mid-20th century and in response he published numerous academic titles and book series in the fields of "international relations, Russian and German history, military science and art" that are still held by major libraries.

His seeking out and publishing the writings of Soviet bloc dissidents during the Cold War brought "the realities of Communism to the Western reading public".

His profusely illustrated art books sought to match the offerings of other American, British and European publishers such as Abrams Books, the Phaidon Press, Skira and Zwemmer in bringing higher quality volumes to the shelves of the general public.

== Personal life ==
Praeger married three times; his third wife was Kellie Masterson. Praeger had four children, daughters Claudia, Andrea, Manya and Alexandra. He died in Boulder, Colorado on 28 May 1994.

== Awards ==
1957: Carey-Thomas Award (Publishers Weekly/R. R. Bowker Company) for outstanding creative publishing in obtaining and offering the Djilas book

== Bibliography ==
=== Chapters, forewords, etc. by Frederick A. Praeger ===
- "Foreword", in: David A. Hackett, The Buchenwald Report, Boulder, Colorado: Westview Press, 1995.
- "The International Dimension of Publishing", in: Elizabeth Geiser, Arnold Dolin and Gladys Topkis, eds., The Business Of Book Publishing: Papers by Practitioners, New York: Routledge, 1985.
- "The Publisher as an Individualist", in: Roger H. Smith, The American Reading Public: What It Reads, Why It Reads From Inside Education and Publishing: Views of Present Status, Future Trends, New York: R. R. Bowker Company, 1963.

== Frederick A. Praeger, Inc. book series ==
The following is a list of some of the principal series; it is not comprehensive.

- Ancient Peoples and Places Series
- Arab Background Series
- Arco Books for Collectors
- Archaeological Guide Series
- Bench Mark Studies on Agricultural Development in Latin America
- Books That Matter Series
- Concepts in Western Thought Series
- The Contemporary Soviet Union Series
- The Contemporary Soviet Union Series: Institutions and Policies
- The Cresset Historical Series
- The Great Revolutions Series
- Grotius Classic Reprint Series
- The Hansard Society Series in Parliament Government
- Hudson Institute Series on National Security and International Order
- Hutchinson's Nature Library Series
- Library of World Affairs series
- Mid-European Studies Center Series
- Nations of the Modern World Series
- The Nature of Human Society
- The Pall Mall Series of Short Political Guides
- The Praeger Asia-Africa Series
- Praeger Film Library
- Praeger Paperbacks
- Praeger Publications in Russian History & World Communism
- Praeger Series on the Middle Ages
- Praeger Short Histories
- Praeger Special Studies in International Economics: Institute for Sino-Soviet Studies (ISSS) Monograph Series
- Praeger Special Studies in U. S. Economic and Social Development
- Praeger University Series
- Praeger World Affairs Special series
- Praeger World of Art Paperbacks
- Praeger World of Art Profile Series
- Praeger World of Art Series
- Princeton Studies Series in World Politics
- Publications of the Council on Foreign Relations
- Russian History and World Communism
- Studies In International Security Series
- Travellers and Explorers Series

== Westview Press book series ==
Below is a list of some of the main series; it is not comprehensive.

- Focus Series
- History and Warfare Series
- Language Library Series
- Latin American Perspectives Series
- Political Cultures Series
- Transitions: Asian and Asian America
