= State socialism =

Political strategy for implementing socialism

State socialism is a political and economic ideology within the socialist movement that advocates state ownership of the means of production. This is intended either as a temporary measure, or as a characteristic of socialism in the transition from the capitalist to the socialist mode of production or to a communist society. State socialism was first theorised by Ferdinand Lassalle. It advocates a planned economy controlled by the state in which all industries and natural resources are state-owned.

Aside from anarchists and other libertarian socialists, there was, in the past, confidence amongst socialists in the concept of state socialism as being the most effective form of socialism. Some early social democrats in the late 19th century and early 20th century, such as the Fabians, claimed that British society was already mostly socialist and that the economy was significantly socialist through government-run enterprises created by conservative and liberal governments which could be run for the interests of the people through their representatives' influence, an argument reinvoked by some socialists in post-war Britain. State socialism declined starting in the 1970s, with stagflation during the 1970s energy crisis, the rise of neoliberalism and later with the fall of state socialist nations in the Eastern Bloc during the Revolutions of 1989 and the fall of the Soviet Union.

Libertarian socialists often treat state socialism as synonymous with state capitalism, arguing that the economic systems of Marxist–Leninist states such as the Soviet Union were not genuinely socialist due to their continued use of commodity production, and wages as remuneration. Democratic and libertarian socialists claim that these states had only a limited number of socialist characteristics. However, others maintain that workers in the Soviet Union and other Marxist–Leninist states had genuine control over the means of production through institutions such as trade unions. Academics, political commentators and other scholars tend to distinguish between authoritarian state socialism and democratic state socialism, with the first representing the Soviet Bloc and the latter representing Western Bloc countries which have been democratically governed by socialist parties such as Britain, France, Sweden and Western social-democracies in general, among others.

As a classification within the socialist movement, state socialism is held in contrast with libertarian socialism, which rejects the view that socialism can be constructed using existing state institutions or governmental policies. By contrast, proponents of state socialism claim that the state—through practical governing considerations—must play at least a temporary part in building socialism. It is possible to conceive of a democratic socialist state that owns the means of production and is internally organised in a participatory, cooperative fashion, thereby achieving both social ownership of productive property and workplace democracy. Today, state socialism is mainly advocated by Marxist–Leninists.

== History ==
The role of the state in socialism has divided the socialist movement. The philosophy of state socialism was first explicitly expounded by Ferdinand Lassalle. In contrast to Karl Marx's perspective, Lassalle rejected the concept of the state as a class-based power structure whose primary function was to preserve existing class structures. Lassalle also rejected the Marxist view that the state was destined to "wither away". Lassalle considered the state an entity independent of class allegiances and an instrument of justice that would therefore be essential for achieving socialism.

Early concepts of state socialism were articulated by anarchist and libertarian philosophers who opposed the concept of the state. In Statism and Anarchy, Mikhail Bakunin identified a statist tendency within the Marxist movement, which he contrasted to libertarian socialism and attributed to Marx's philosophy. Bakunin predicted that Marx's theory of the transition from capitalism to socialism involving the working class seizing state power in a dictatorship of the proletariat would eventually lead to a usurpation of power by the state apparatus acting in its self-interest, ushering in a new form of capitalism rather than establishing socialism.

As a political ideology, state socialism rose to prominence during the 20th century Bolshevik, Leninist, and later Marxist–Leninist revolutions, where single-party control over the state and, by extension, over the political and economic spheres of society was justified as a means to safeguard the revolution against counter-revolutionary insurrection and foreign invasion. The Stalinist theory of socialism in one country was an attempt to legitimise state-directed activity to accelerate the industrialisation of the Soviet Union.

== Description and theory ==
As a political ideology, state socialism is one of the major dividing lines in the broader socialist movement. It is often contrasted with non-state or anti-state forms of socialism, such as those that advocate direct self-management adhocracy and direct cooperative ownership and management of the means of production. Political philosophies contrasted with state socialism include libertarian socialist philosophies such as anarchism, De Leonism, economic democracy, free-market socialism, libertarian Marxism and syndicalism. These forms of socialism are opposed to hierarchical technocratic socialism, scientific management and state-directed economic planning.

The modern concept of state socialism, when used in reference to Soviet-style economic and political systems, emerged from a deviation in Marxist theory starting with Vladimir Lenin. In Marxist theory, socialism is projected to emerge in the most developed capitalist economies, where capitalism suffers the greatest internal contradictions and class conflict. On the other hand, state socialism became a revolutionary theory for the world's poorest, often quasi-feudal, countries.

In such systems, the state apparatus is used as an instrument of capital accumulation, forcibly extracting surplus from the working class and peasantry to modernise and industrialise poor countries. Such systems are described as state capitalism because the state engages in capital accumulation, primarily as part of the primitive accumulation of capital (see also the Soviet theory of primitive socialist accumulation). The difference is that the state acts as a public entity and engages in this activity to achieve socialism by re-investing the accumulated capital into society, whether in more healthcare, education, employment or consumer goods. In contrast, in capitalist societies, the surplus from the working class is spent on whatever needs the owners of the means of production want.

In the traditional view of socialism, thinkers such as Friedrich Engels and Henri de Saint-Simon took the position that the state will change in nature in a socialist society, with the function of the state changing from one of political rule over people into a scientific administration of the processes of production. Specifically, the state would become a coordinating economic entity consisting of interdependent inclusive associations rather than a mechanism of class and political control, ceasing to be a state in the traditional definition.

Preceding the Bolshevik-led revolution in Russia, many socialist groups such as anarchists, orthodox Marxist currents such as council communism and the Mensheviks, reformists and other democratic and libertarian socialists criticized the idea of using the state to conduct central planning and nationalization of the means of production as a way to establish socialism.

== Political perspectives ==
State socialism was traditionally advocated as a means for achieving public ownership of the means of production through the nationalization of industry. This was intended to be a transitional phase in building a socialist economy. The goals of nationalization were to dispossess large capitalists and consolidate industry so that profit would go toward public finance rather than private fortune. Nationalization would be the first step in a long-term process of socializing production, introducing employee management and reorganizing production to directly produce for use rather than profit.

The British Fabian Society included proponents of state socialism, such as Sidney Webb. George Bernard Shaw referred to Fabians as "all Social Democrats, with a common confiction [sic] of the necessity of vesting the organization of industry and the material of production in a State identified with the whole people by complete Democracy". Nonetheless, Shaw also published the Report on Fabian Policy (1896), declaring: "The Fabian Society does not suggest that the State should monopolize industry as against private enterprise or individual initiative". Robert Blatchford, a member of the Fabian Society and the Independent Labour Party, wrote the work Merrie England (1894) that endorsed municipal socialism. In Merrie England, Blatchford distinguished two types of socialism, namely ideal socialism and practical socialism. Blatchford's practical socialism was a state socialism that identified existing state enterprises such as the Post Office run by the municipalities as a demonstration of practical socialism in action while claiming that practical socialism should involve the extension of state enterprise to the means of production as the common property of the people. Although endorsing state socialism, Blatchford's Merrie England and his other writings were nonetheless influenced by anarcho-communist William Morris—as Blatchford himself attested to—and Morris' anarcho-communist themes are present in Merrie England.

Democratic socialists argue for a gradual, peaceful transition from capitalism to socialism. They wish to neutralize or abolish capitalism through political reform rather than revolution. This method of gradualism implies the utilization of the existing state apparatus and machinery of government to move society toward socialism. Other socialists sometimes deride it as a form of socialism from above or political elitism for relying on electoral means to achieve socialism. In contrast, Marxism and revolutionary socialism holds that a proletarian revolution is the only practical way to implement fundamental changes in the structure of society. Socialists who advocate representative democracy believe that after a certain period under socialism, the state will "wither away" because class distinctions cease to exist. Representative democracy will be replaced by direct democracy in the remaining public associations comprising the former state. Political power would be decentralized and distributed evenly among the population, producing a communist society.

In 1888, the individualist anarchist Benjamin Tucker, who proclaimed himself to be an anarchistic socialist in opposition to state socialism, included the full text of a "Socialistic Letter" by Ernest Lesigne in his essay "State Socialism and Anarchism". According to Lesigne, there are two socialisms: "One is dictatorial, the other libertarian". Tucker's two socialisms were state socialism which he associated with the Marxist school, and the libertarian socialism he advocated. Tucker noted that "the fact that State Socialism has overshadowed other forms of Socialism gives it no right to a monopoly of the Socialistic idea". According to Tucker, those two schools of socialism had in common the labour theory of value and the ends by which anarchism pursued different means.

=== In socialist states ===
The economic model adopted in the former Soviet Union, Eastern Bloc, and other socialist states is often described as a form of state socialism. The ideological basis for this system was the Stalinist theory of socialism in one country. The system that emerged in the 1930s in the Soviet Union was based on state ownership of the means of production and centralized planning, along with bureaucratic workplace management by state officials that were ultimately subordinate to the all-encompassing communist party. Rather than the producers controlling and managing production, the party controlled the government machinery, which directed the national economy on behalf of the communist party, and planned the production and distribution of capital goods.

Because of this development, classical and orthodox Marxists and Trotskyist groups denounced the communist states as Stalinist and their economies as state capitalist or representing deformed or degenerated workers' states. Within the socialist movement, there is criticism towards the use of the term socialist states in relation to countries such as China and previously of the Soviet Union and Eastern and Central European states before what some term the "collapse of Stalinism" in 1989.

Trotskyism argues that the leadership of the communist states was corrupt and that it abandoned Marxism in all but name. In particular, some Trotskyist schools call those countries degenerated workers' states to contrast them with proper socialism (i.e. workers' states), while other Marxists and some Trotskyist schools call them state capitalist to emphasize the lack of genuine socialism and the presence of defining capitalist characteristics (wage labour, commodity production and bureaucratic control over workers).

=== In Germany ===
Otto von Bismarck implemented social programs between 1883 and 1889 following his anti-socialist laws, partly as remedial measures to appease the working class and detract support for the Social Democratic Party of Germany (SPD). Bismarck's biographer A. J. P. Taylor wrote: "It would be unfair to say that Bismarck took up social welfare solely to weaken the Social Democrats; he had had it in mind for a long time, and believed in it deeply. But as usual he acted on his beliefs at the exact moment when they served a practical need". When a reference was made to his friendship with Ferdinand Lassalle (a nationalist and state-oriented socialist), Bismarck said that he was a more practical socialist than the Social Democrats. These policies were informally referred to as State Socialism by liberal and conservative opponents, and supporters of the programs later adopted the term in a further attempt to detract the working class from the SPD, to make the working class content with a nationalist-oriented capitalist welfare state.

Bismarck made the following statement as a justification for his social welfare programs: "Whoever has pensions for his old age is far more easier to handle than one who has no such prospect. Look at the difference between a private servant in the chancellery or at court; the latter will put up with much more, because he has a pension to look forward to".

This did not prevent the Social Democrats from becoming the biggest party in parliament by 1912. According to historian Jonathan Steinberg, "[a]ll told, Bismarck's system was a massive success—except in one respect. His goal to keep the Social Democratic Party out of power utterly failed. The vote for the Social Democratic Party went up and by 1912 they were the biggest party in the Reichstag".

== Analysis and reception ==
Many democratic and libertarian socialists, including anarchists, mutualists and syndicalists, criticize state socialism for advocating a workers' state instead of abolishing the bourgeois state apparatus outright. They use the term state socialism to contrast it with their form of socialism, which involves either collective ownership (in the form of worker cooperatives) or common ownership of the means of production without centralized state planning. Those socialists believe there is no need for a state in a socialist system because there would be no class to suppress and no need for an institution based on coercion and therefore regard the state being a remnant of capitalism. They hold that statism is antithetical to true socialism, the goal of which is the eyes of socialists such as William Morris, who wrote as follows in a Commonweal article: "State Socialism? — I don't agree with it; in fact I think the two words contradict one another, and that it is the business of Socialism to destroy the State and put Free Society in its place".

Classical and orthodox Marxists also view state socialism as an oxymoron, arguing that while an association for managing production and economic affairs would exist in socialism, it would no longer be a state in the Marxist definition based on domination by one class. Preceding the Bolshevik-led revolution in Russia, many socialist groups—including reformists, orthodox Marxist currents such as council communism and the Mensheviks, as well as anarchists and other libertarian socialists—criticized the idea of using the state to conduct planning and nationalization of the means of production as a way to establish socialism. Lenin himself acknowledged his policies as state capitalism.

Some Trotskyists following Tony Cliff deny it is socialism, calling it state capitalism. Other Trotskyists agree that these states could not be described as socialist but deny that they were state capitalist. They support Leon Trotsky's analysis of the pre-restoration Soviet Union as a workers' state that had degenerated into a bureaucratic dictatorship which rested on a largely nationalized industry run according to a production plan and claimed that the former Stalinist states of Central and Eastern Europe were deformed workers' states based on the same relations of production as the Soviet Union. Some Trotskyists, such as the Committee for a Workers' International, have sometimes included African, Asian and Middle Eastern constitutional socialist states when they have had a nationalized economy as deformed workers' states. Other socialists argued that the neo-Ba'athists promoted capitalists from within the party and outside their countries.

Those socialists who oppose any system of state control believe in a more decentralized approach which puts the means of production directly into the hands of the workers rather than indirectly through state bureaucracies which they claim represent a new elite or class. This leads them to consider state socialism a form of state capitalism (an economy based on centralized management, capital accumulation and wage labour, but with the state owning the means of production) which Engels stated would be the final form of capitalism rather than socialism. Furthermore, nationalization and state ownership have nothing to do with socialism by itself, having been historically carried out for various purposes under various political and economic systems.

State socialism is often referred to by right-wing detractors simply as socialism, including Austrian School economists such as Friedrich Hayek and Ludwig von Mises, who used socialism as a synonym for central planning and state socialism. This is notable in the United States, where socialism is a pejorative term to mean state socialism used by members of the political right to stop the implementation of liberal and progressive policies and proposals and to criticize the public figures trying to implement them. One criticism primarily related to state socialism is the economic calculation problem, followed by the socialist calculation debate.

== See also ==
- Mustafa Kemal Atatürk
- Authoritarian socialism
- Edward Bellamy
- Bureaucratic collectivism
- Degenerated workers' state
- Deformed workers' state
- Libertarian socialism
- Marxism–Leninism
- New class
- Planned economy
- Public ownership
- Public sector
- Reformism
- Social democracy
- Socialism in one country
- Socialist state
- Soviet-type planning
- State capitalism
- State Socialism (Germany)
- Trotskyism

== Bibliography ==
- Berlau, A Joseph (1949). The German Social Democratic Party, 1914–1921. New York City: Columbia University Press.
