= Bruno Rizzi =

Italian political theorist (1901–1977)

Bruno Rizzi (20 March 1901 – 13 January 1977) was an Italian political theorist.

== Early life and activism ==
Bruno Rizzi was born on 20 March 1901 in Porto Mantovano. In 1918, he joined the Italian Socialist Party (PSI) but left in 1921 to be among the founders of the Communist Party of Italy (PCdI) in 1921. He left the PCdI in 1930. Due to persecution under Fascist Italy, Rizzi emigrated to France. During the late 1930s, he intervened in the debates involving Leon Trotsky, James Burnham, and Yvan Craipeau concerning the nature of the Soviet Union.

== Writings on bureaucratic states ==
His most important work, La Bureaucratisation du Monde (Bureaucratisation of the World), was published in Paris in 1939, but most copies were seized by the French government. In it, he stated that fascism and Stalinism were developing similar political methods. Trotsky thoroughly criticized Rizzi's conflation of fascism and Stalinism as part of his polemic "In Defence of Marxism", which was written to oppose the positions of the Burnham-Shachtman minority in the U.S. Socialist Workers Party.

It would be more than 30 years before an abridged version of Rizzi's work would be published in Italy. In the original text, he argued for common cause by the totalitarian regimes of Germany, Italy, and the Soviet Union, stating: "The racist struggles of national socialism and fascism, fundamentally, are nothing but an anti-capitalist campaign led by a new social synthesis, theoretically erroneous but practically just." This was omitted from later editions. Following the fall of France in 1940, he published the pamphlet Écoute Citoyen! (Listen, Citizen!), in which he repeated these claims.

== Later life and death ==
Rizzi returned to Italy in 1943, but withdrew to private life, working as a shoe salesman. He contributed irregularly to Critica Sociale, Tempi Moderni and Rassegna di Sociologia. Rizzi died on 13 January 1977 in Bussolengo.

== See also ==
- Bureaucratic collectivism
