= The New Class: An Analysis of the Communist System =

1957 book by Milovan Đilas

The New Class: An Analysis of the Communist System Нова класа: Анализа комунистичког система (Serbian)
- Author: Milovan Đilas
- Language: English
- Published: 1957
- Publisher: Frederick A. Praeger, Inc.
- Publication place: United Kingdom

The New Class: An Analysis of the Communist System (Serbian: Нова класа: Анализа комунистичког система) is a political theory book about the concept of the new class by communist Yugoslav figure and intellectual Milovan Đilas. He proposed that the party-state officials formed a class which "uses, enjoys and disposes of nationalised property".

In the former Yugoslavia the book was not legally published until 1990, when Narodna knjiga from Belgrade finally released it. Before that, both the Serbian manuscript and the English edition circulated on the black market. The manuscript was completed before 1956, the year of Đilas’s arrest, after which he spent nine years in prison – including 22 months in solitary confinement. The book has been translated into 50 languages and sold over 3 million copies. It was read by Che Guevara and Mao Zedong.

== Origins ==
Djilas discussed the roots of modern Communism in this chapter, with the communists citing Marx, the "replacement of capitalism can take place only by revolutionary means". Yet, he confesses that "Almost nothing remains of original Marxism...only a residue of formalism and dogmatism remained of Marx's dialectics and materialism; this was used for the purpose of cementing power, justifying tyranny, and violating human conscience". Revolutions only took place in Russia, China, and Yugoslavia. Communism was imposed on Poland, Czechoslovakia, Hungary, Rumania, and Bulgaria by the Soviet Army, and made identical to the Soviet system.

== Character of the Revolution ==
In this chapter, Djilas discusses the communist centralization of power and the exclusion of other political groups. Djilas states, "At the same time they demand uniformity of all viewpoints, including practical political views as well as theoretical, philosophical, and even moral views". Additionally, he concludes, "Ownership is nothing other than the right of profit and control. If one defines class benefits by this right, the Communist states have seen, in the final analysis, the origin of a new form of ownership or of a new ruling and exploiting class".

== The New Class ==
Djilas defines the new class in this chapter as the political bureaucracy, "a monopoly over the working class itself". This "new class actually seized the lion's share of the economic and other progress earned by the sacrifices and efforts of the masses". Djilas attributes the rise of this new class to Stalin.

== The Party State ==
In this chapter Djilas claims the Communist Party "is the backbone of the entire political, economic, and ideological activity," with public life determined by "what happens party forums". He further states, "Regardless of laws, everyone knows that the government is in the hands of the party committees and the secret police".

== National Communism ==
Djilas foresaw the future independence movement in Eastern Europe.

The Communist East European countries did not become satellites of the USSR because they benefited from it, but because they were too weak to prevent it. As soon as they become stronger, or as favorable conditions are created, a yearning for independence and for protection of 'their own people' from Soviet hegemony will arise among them. (...) The central Soviet government has found itself in difficulty because of the nationalism existing even in those governments which it installed in the Soviet republics (Ukraine, Caucasia), and still more so with regard to those governments installed in the East European countries.
