= Degenerated workers' state =

Trotskyist view of state socialist bureaucracy, particularly under Stalin

In Trotskyist political theory, a degenerated workers' state is a dictatorship of the proletariat in which the working class's democratic control over the state has given way to control by a bureaucratic clique. The term was developed by Leon Trotsky in The Revolution Betrayed (1936) and in other works.

== Soviet experience ==
Trotsky argued that Russia was a genuine workers' state from the 1917 October Revolution until Joseph Stalin's consolidation of power. The bourgeoisie had been politically overthrown in 1917 by the working class, and the economic basis of that state lay in collective ownership of the means of production. Contrary to the predictions of many socialists such as Lenin, the revolution failed to spread to Germany and other industrial Western European countries (although there was massive upheaval due to working-class action in some of those countries) and so the Soviet state began to degenerate. That was worsened by the material and political degradation of the Russian working class by the Civil War of 1917–1923.

After the death of Lenin in 1924, the ruling stratum of the Soviet Union, which consolidated around Stalin, was held to be a bureaucratic caste, not a new ruling class, because its political control did not also extend to economic ownership. The theory that the Soviet Union was a degenerated workers' state is closely connected to Trotsky's call for a political revolution in the Soviet Union, as well as Trotsky's call to defend the Soviets from capitalist restoration.

Trotsky summarised the more optimistic arguments within the International Left Opposition:

Perhaps this is a workers' state, in the last analysis, but there has not been left in it a vestige of the dictatorship of the proletariat. We have here a degenerated workers' state under the dictatorship of the bureaucracy.

Trotsky always emphasised that the degenerated workers' state was not a new form of society but a transitional phase between capitalism and socialism (and closer to capitalism) that would inevitably collapse into one form or the other. He argued, however, that whether the downfall led to the restoration of workers' democracy or to capitalist restoration would depend on whether the movement to overthrow the dictatorship of the bureaucracy was led by the organised working class:

The inevitable collapse of the Stalinist political regime will lead to the establishment of Soviet democracy only in the event that the removal of Bonapartism comes as the conscious act of the proletarian vanguard. In all other cases, in place of Stalinism there could only come the fascist-capitalist counter-revolution.

== "Degenerated" vs. "deformed" ==
The term "degenerated workers' state" commonly refers only to the Soviet Union. Trotskyists of the Fourth International (founded in 1938) coined the term "deformed workers' state" to describe states (like the Soviet satellite states of Eastern Europe as well as China) based upon collectivised means of production, but in which the working class never held direct political power. The two terms therefore label similar phenomena in that they both refer to states where the bourgeoisie no longer holds power, where the means of production has been socialised and where an unaccountable bureaucratic elite holds the political reins. They differ in the history of how their situation has arisen: through the bureaucratic degeneration of a genuine workers' democracy, as in the Soviet Union; or through the establishment of a deformed workers' state resulting from the overthrow of bourgeois rule and ownership by some force other than the mass action of the organised working class, such as by an invasion, a guerrilla army, or a military coup.

== Critics ==
Samuel Farber in Jacobin argues that a huge part of the Soviet Union's degeneration under Stalin came from its lack of political reform and political liberalization under Lenin. Farber argues that liberalization could have enabled Soviet workers to organize against Stalinism and to stop Stalinism's worst excesses, such as Stalin's forced collectivization and mass purges.

== Related terms ==
"Proletarian bonapartism" is another theoretical term used by some Trotskyists (most notably Ted Grant) to describe the dictatorial rule of bureaucracies in such "degenerated" or "deformed" workers' states.

== See also ==
- Bureaucracy in the Soviet Union
- New class
- State socialism
- Iron law of oligarchy
