= The Revolution Betrayed =

1937 book by Leon Trotsky

The Revolution Betrayed: What is the Soviet Union and Where is it Going?
- Author: Leon Trotsky
- Original title: Преданная революция: Что такое СССР и куда он идет?
- Translator: Max Eastman (English)
- Language: Russian
- Genre: Nonfiction
- Publisher: Éditions Grasset (France), Pathfinder Books (America), НИИ Культуры (Soviet Union)
- Publication date: 1936
- Publication place: France
- Media type: Print

The Revolution Betrayed: What is the Soviet Union and Where is it Going? (Russian: Преданная революция: Что такое СССР и куда он идет?, romanized: Predannaya revolyutsiya: Chto takoye SSSR i kuda on idet?) is a book published in 1936 by the former Soviet leader Leon Trotsky.

The book criticized the Soviet Union's actions and development following the death of Vladimir Lenin in 1924. The book is regarded as Trotsky's primary work dealing with the nature of Stalinism and socialist democracy. The book was written by Trotsky during his exile in Norway and was originally translated into Spanish by Victor Serge. The most widely available English translation is by Max Eastman.

Trotsky also argued in the book for the restoration of the right of criticism in areas such as economic matters, the revitalization of trade unions and free elections of multiple Soviet parties. Trotsky further contended that the excessive totalitarianism under Stalin had undermined the potential development of the Soviet Union.

== Historical background ==
Leon Trotsky (born Lev Davidovich Bronstein, 1879–1940) was one of the leaders of the October Revolution which brought the Bolsheviks to power in Russia in 1917. In 1900, as a leading Marxist theoretician and revolutionary, Trotsky was exiled to Siberia for his socialist activities against the Russian Empire. In 1905, Trotsky returned to Russia for the 1905 Russian Revolution, where his oratory skills made him a leading figure in the Saint Petersburg Soviet. He was arrested by the Tsarist police authorities in December 1905. After again escaping Tsarist Russia for continental Europe, Trotsky politically transitioned from supporting the Menshevik wing of the RSDLP to advocating for the unity of social-democratic factions in 1913 with the establishment of the Mezhraiontsy, the Inter-District Organization of United Social-Democrats.

The virtual collapse of the old Tsarist regime during the latter part of World War I motivated the Mezhraiontsy and Bolsheviks, headed by Vladimir Lenin, to cooperate. In early 1917, Trotsky returned to Russia from exile in New York to join the Bolshevik party's governing Central Committee. Trotsky played an important role in laying the groundwork for the seizure of power from the Russian Provisional Government headed by Alexander Kerensky, on November 7 [O.S. October 25], 1917. Trotsky had become the head of the Petrograd Soviet in early October and had built the institution's Military-Revolutionary Committee into a fighting force.

Following the dissolution of the Kerensky government, Trotsky was named the first People's Commissar of Foreign Affairs of the RSFSR of Soviet Russia. In April 1918, Trotsky was named People's Commissar for War and the Navy. In this role, Trotsky built the Red Army which would defend the new social-democrat regime against anti-Bolshevik factions in the Russian Civil War.

In 1923, Lenin retired from active political life following a series of strokes. Lenin's death in January 1924 ushered in an interregnum during which several leading political candidates competed for leadership. Lenin's longtime associate and Communist International chief Grigory Zinoviev, Moscow party leader Lev Kamenev, nationalities expert and party organization secretary Joseph Stalin, and military leader Trotsky were recognised as the leading contenders for party and state primacy. Trotsky's eloquence, popularity and role within the military led the other three contenders to form a temporary alliance against him.

Trotsky and his supporters were increasingly marginalized and isolated by the evolving Soviet leadership group over the next several years, with Trotsky labelled as a political oppositionist and his supporters undermined by political and police pressure. Trotsky's successive exiles, first in 1928 to the remote city of Alma Ata in Soviet Central Asia and again to Turkey in 1929, accelerated this marginization. Despite this, Trotsky continued to function as an opposition political leader from exile throughout the rest of his life. This continued political activism against the Soviet Union, now headed by Joseph Stalin, led to ongoing political pressure by the Soviet government against countries in which Trotsky sought exile.

== Writings and publications ==
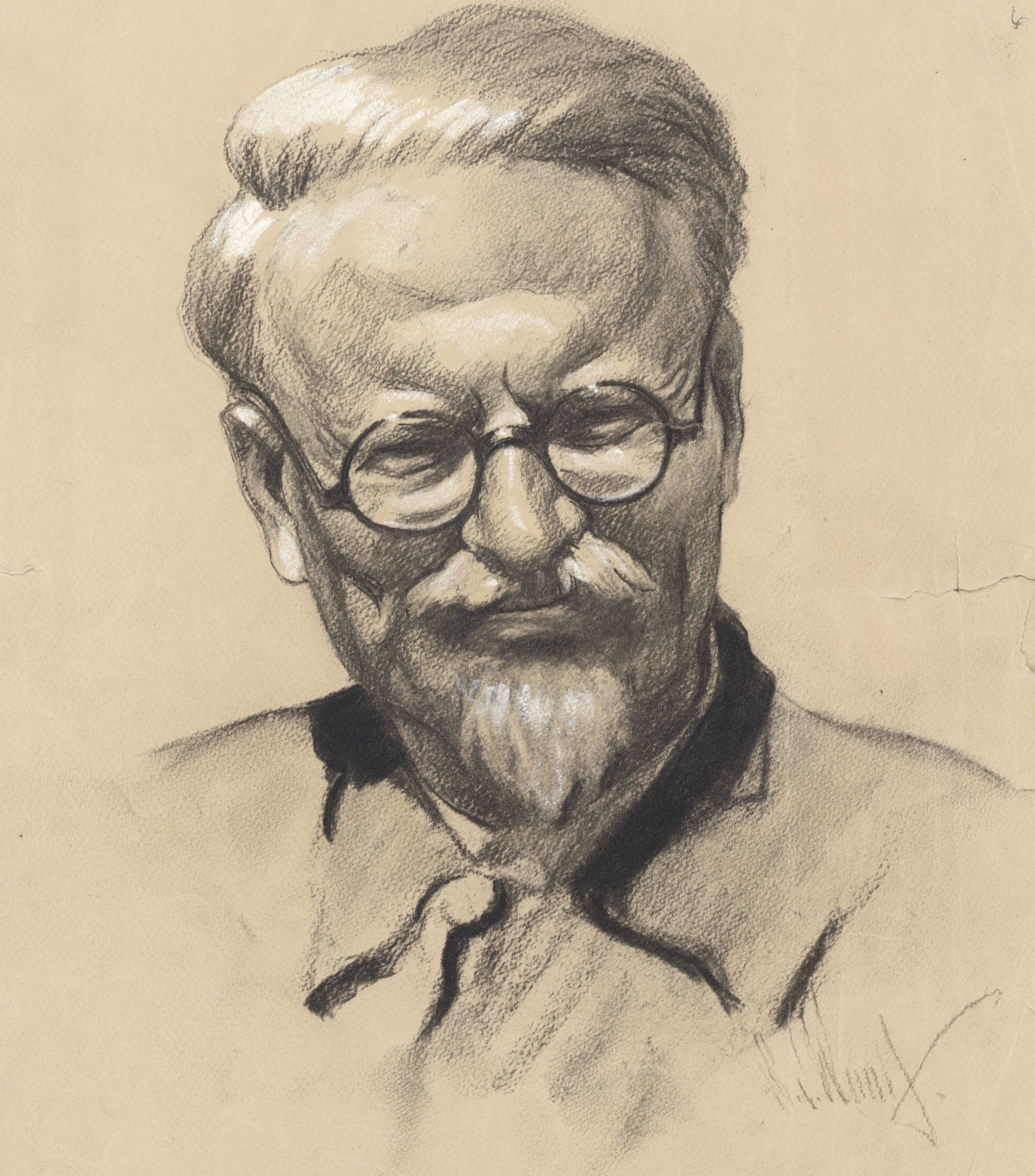
Portrait of Trotsky, 1936–37 (S. J. Woolf, charcoal and chalk on paper)

In the spring of 1935, Trotsky formally sought political asylum in Norway with an appeal to the Labour Party government. In early June, Trotsky was notified that he was to proceed to the Norwegian embassy in Paris to obtain a visa. Norwegian politics intervened, however, and the visa approval was revoked by the time Trotsky arrived at the embassy on June 10. French police alleged that this was part of a ruse to obtain residency in Paris by Trotsky, who had been banned from the city, and immediately ordered him to leave.Trotsky's planned voyage to Norway was subsequently canceled. Norwegian authorities required Trotsky to obtain a permit for re-entry into France before a visa for travel to Norway would be granted. After negotiation, the demand for the unobtainable French re-entry permit was dropped and Trotsky was granted a six-month visa to enter Norway. In accordance with terms previously set by the French government, the Norwegian government had the right to determine Trotsky's place of residence and to exclude him from the capital city of Oslo. He arrived on June 18, 1935.

The Revolution Betrayed was completed in August 1936, immediately prior to the public announcement of the first of three great public Moscow trials instigated by the secret police, and subsequently known as the "Great Purge" (Yezhovshchina). The trial would ultimately end with the execution of Grigory Zinoviev, Lev Kamenev, and other prominent Soviet political figures. Once Trotsky became aware of the trial, he rapidly added a short postscript to his introduction which claimed that the book constituted "advance exposure" of the Stalin regime's effort at "deliberate mystification".

== Content ==
The Revolution Betrayed has been characterized by historian Baruch Knei-Paz as Trotsky's "major work on Stalinism" and constituted the chief primary source for summaries of Trotsky's thinking on bureaucracy in a seminal 1978 intellectual survey.

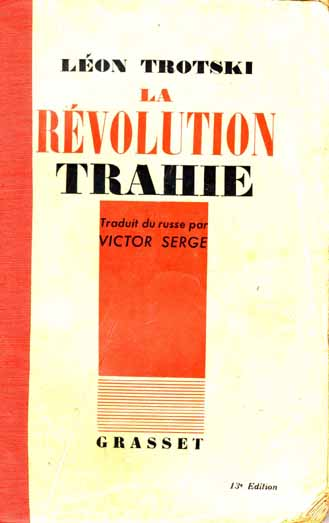
French edition translated by Victor Serge

Knei-Paz considered that the subtitle chosen by Trotsky for The Revolution Betrayed – "What is the Soviet Union and Where is it Going?" – accurately summarized the author's intent behind the book. Trotsky was preoccupied with the question of whether the emerging bureaucratic political and economic formation in the USSR constituted a new social model not encompassed previously by Marxist doctrine. Knei-Paz asserted that while Trotsky insisted that the Soviet system did not constitute any such new social and economic system, in reality the analysis he presented in The Revolution Betrayed was, in fact, "ambivalent".

The book is a wide-ranging critique of the USSR and its rulers, and advocates a new political revolution to overthrow the Stalinist dictatorship and bring about a socialist democracy. It opens by praising the positive economic advances of the USSR since the death of Lenin, citing growth in electrical power, agricultural output, industry, etc. It then proceeds to describe the limits on this economic advance, the nature of the new ruling elite, and predicts the ultimate downfall of the Soviet Union as a result of Stalinist rule. It places an emphasis on a Marxist method of analysis, and makes several key observations and predictions, some of which would only be borne out many decades later.

The first few chapters examine the "zigzags", as Trotsky describes them, in the policy pursued by the Communist Party, citing rapid panicked changes in policy as a direct result of a lack of democracy. Trotsky highlights the most important of these "zigzags" in the field of economic policy, criticizing Stalin and Nikolai Bukharin's policy of at first opposing voluntary collectivization and increasing privatization of land and then of an abrupt reversal of policy towards rapid industrialization and forced collectivization, which Trotsky brands "economic adventurism" that carried "the nation to the edge of disaster". Trotsky then discusses labor productivity and criticizes the uselessness of the Stakhanovite movement and "shock brigades".

Trotsky then analyzes the "Soviet Thermidor" (Thermidor is a reference to the later stages of the French Revolution, when conservative forces took hold of society). He analyzes the triumph of Stalin, the separation of the party from Bolshevism, and the rising bureaucratic stratum. The importance of this chapter lies in Trotsky's observation that the ruling stratum in the USSR are neither capitalists nor workers, but rather a section of the working class alienated from its class roots, influenced both by the bureaucracy left over from the Tsarist era and the de-politicisation of the working class.

Trotsky refers to Stalinism as a form of "Bonapartism", drawing a comparison with the French dictator Napoleon Bonaparte and his capture of the French state after that country's revolution. Just as Bonaparte brought back the trappings of the aristocracy and imprisoned capitalists despite presiding over a new capitalist social system, Stalin imprisons workers and behaves like a Tsar despite failing to overturn the gains of a planned economy and nominal public ownership. At the same time, Trotsky writes that this ruling stratum impoverishes the rest of society, asserting that "a planned economy requires democracy just as the human body requires oxygen"; without democracy, he predicts economic stagnation.

He next discusses everyday life in the Soviet Union, economic inequality and the oppression of the new proletariat. He links the increasing conservatism in the treatment of women and the family directly with the rise of Stalinism, and compares it to the period before the revolution. From here he discusses foreign policy and the Soviet military: the failure to defeat fascism, the re-institution of ranks and the loss of a militia, and closes by examining the future of the Soviet Union.

One of the predictions made by Trotsky was that the USSR would come before a disjuncture: either the toppling of the ruling bureaucracy by means of a political revolution, or capitalist restoration led by the bureaucracy:

The fall of the present bureaucratic dictatorship, if it were not replaced by a new socialist power, would thus mean a return to capitalist relations with a catastrophic decline of industry and culture.

This prediction was made at a time when most commentators, capitalist and Stalinist, predicted the continued rise of Soviet power. As Allin Cottrell and Paul Cockshott would later write in their 1992 book Towards a New Socialism, Trotsky's prediction proved prescient. Lack of economic democracy coupled with computer technology that (at the time) was not yet advanced enough to plan the economy led to economic stagnation in the 1960s and 1970s (Era of Stagnation). Leading members of the ruling party (who were overwhelmingly from the more privileged stratum of Soviet society) responded to the stagnation by promoting capitalist reforms in the 1980s, rather than expanding more democratic forms of socialism.

== See also ==
- Betrayal thesis
- List of books by Leon Trotsky
- Predictions of the collapse of the Soviet Union
