= New class =

Polemic term for the ruling class of Soviet-type states

New class is a polemic term by critics of countries that followed the Soviet-type state socialism to describe the privileged ruling class of bureaucrats and Communist party functionaries which arose in these states. Generally, the group known in the Soviet Union as the nomenklatura conforms to the theory of the new class. The term was earlier applied to other emerging strata of the society. Milovan Đilas' new-class theory was also used extensively by anti-communist commentators in the Western world in their criticism of the Communist states during the Cold War.

"Red bourgeoisie" is a pejorative synonym for the term new class, crafted by leftist critics and movements like the 1968 student demonstrations in Belgrade. New class is also used as a term in late 1960s post-industrial sociology.

== Milovan Đilas' analysis ==
A theory of the new class was developed by Milovan Đilas the Vice President of the Federal People's Republic of Yugoslavia under Josip Broz Tito, who participated with Tito in the Yugoslav People's Liberation War but was later purged by him as Đilas began to advocate democratic and egalitarian ideals, which he believed were more in line with the way socialism and communism should look like. There were also personal antagonisms between the two men, and Tito felt Đilas undermined his leadership. The theory of the new class can be considered to oppose the theories of certain ruling Communists, such as Joseph Stalin, who argued that their revolutions and/or social reforms would result in the extinction of any ruling class as such. It was Đilas's observation as a member of a Communist government that Party members stepped into the role of ruling class, a problem which he believed should be corrected through revolution. Đilas completed his primary work on his new class theory in the mid-1950s. While Đilas was in prison, it was published in 1957 in the West under the title The New Class: An Analysis of the Communist System.

Đilas posited that the new class's specific relationship to the means of production was one of collective political control, and that the new class's property form was political control. For Đilas, the new class not only seeks expanded material reproduction to politically justify its existence to the working class but also seeks expanded reproduction of political control as a form of property in itself. This can be compared to the capitalist who seeks expanded value through increased sharemarket values, even though the sharemarket itself does not necessarily reflect an increase in the value of commodities produced. Đilas used this argument about property forms to indicate why the new class sought parades, marches and spectacles despite this activity lowering the levels of material productivity. Đilas proposed that the new class only slowly came to self-consciousness of itself as a class. On arriving at a full self-consciousness, the initial project undertaken would be massive industrialisation in order to cement the external security of the new class's rule against foreign or alternative ruling classes. In Đilas's schema, this approximated the 1930s and 1940s in the Soviet Union. As the new class suborns all other interests to its own security during this period, it freely executes and purges its own members in order to achieve its major goal of security as a ruling class. After security has been achieved, the new class pursues a policy of moderation towards its own members, effectively granting material rewards and freedom of thought and action within the new class, so long as this freedom is not used to undermine the rule of the new class. Đilas identified this period as the period of Khrushchev's government in the Soviet Union. Due to the emergence of conflicts of policy within the new class, the potential for palace coups, or the possibility of populist revolutions, as experienced in Poland and Hungary, respectively. Finally, Đilas predicted a period of economic decline, as the political future of the new class was consolidated around a staid programme of corruption and self-interest at the expense of other social classes. This can be interpreted as a prediction of the Leonid Brezhnev so-called Era of Stagnation by Đilas. Đilas also heavily criticized Soviet imperialist practices for violating the national sovereignty of Eastern European countries and the unequal price exchange in trade between the USSR and these republics. He predicted that these countries would desire more sovereignty and independence from the totalitarian communist imperialist system. This can be interpreted as the prediction of Revolutions of 1989.

While Đilas posited that the new class was a social class with a distinct relationship to the means of production, he did not claim that this new class was associated with a self-sustaining mode of production. This claim, within Marxist theory, argues that the Soviet-style societies must eventually either collapse backwards towards capitalism, or experience a social revolution towards real socialism. This can be seen as a prediction of the downfall of the Soviet Union. Robert D. Kaplan's 1993 book Balkan Ghosts: A Journey through history also contains a discussion with Đilas, who used his model to anticipate many of the events that subsequently came to pass in the former Yugoslavia. Đilas also argues that a communist society has three phases: the revolutionary phase, the dogmatic phase, and the non-dogmatic phase. The new class does not perish despite attempts to moderate communist practices such as Yugoslavia's workers' self-management or the reversal of Stalinist totalitarian policies of Khrushchev Thaw. Đilas argues these moderations are only concessions of the communist bureaucracy to appease the working class and therefore consolidate their new class rule. Marxists like Ernest Mandel have criticised Đilas for ignoring the existence of a new socio-economic system, which cannot be reconciled with the old class system.

=== Similarity to other analyses ===
Mikhail Bakunin had made a point in his International Workingmen's Association debates with Marx in the mid-to-late 19th century of bureaucrats becoming a new oppressive class in socialist states. This idea was repeated after the Russian revolution by anarchists like Peter Kropotkin and Nestor Makhno, as well as some Marxists. In 1911, Robert Michels first proposed the Iron law of oligarchy, which described the development of bureaucratic hierarchies in supposedly egalitarian and democratic socialist parties. It was later repeated by a leader of the Russian Revolution, Leon Trotsky, through his theory of degenerated workers state. Mao Zedong also had his own version of this idea developed during the Socialist Education Movement to criticize the Chinese Communist Party under Liu Shaoqi. This wide range of people over the decades had different perspectives on the matter, but there was also a degree of core agreement on this idea.

Đilas' New Class has also been likened to the professional–managerial class seen in advanced capitalist societies. In fact, originating with James Burnham's famous discussion thereof, there is a whole tradition that posits a purportedly very troublesome convergence between especially the Chinese and Western political order along such lines.

== John Kenneth Galbraith and post-industrial sociology ==
Canadian-American economist John Kenneth Galbraith also wrote about a similar phenomenon under capitalism, the emergence of a technocratic layer in The New Industrial State and The Affluent Society. The new-class model as a theory of new social groups in post-industrial societies gained ascendency during the 1970s as social and political scientists noted how new-class groups were shaped by post-material orientations in their pursuit of political and social goals. New-class themes "no longer have a direct relationship to the imperatives of economic security."

== See also ==
- Bureaucratic collectivism
- Corporate sociopolitical activism
- Cadre management in the Soviet Union
- Degenerated workers' state
- Deformed workers' state
- Managerial state
- New Soviet man
