= Julia (Nineteen Eighty-Four) =

Fictional character

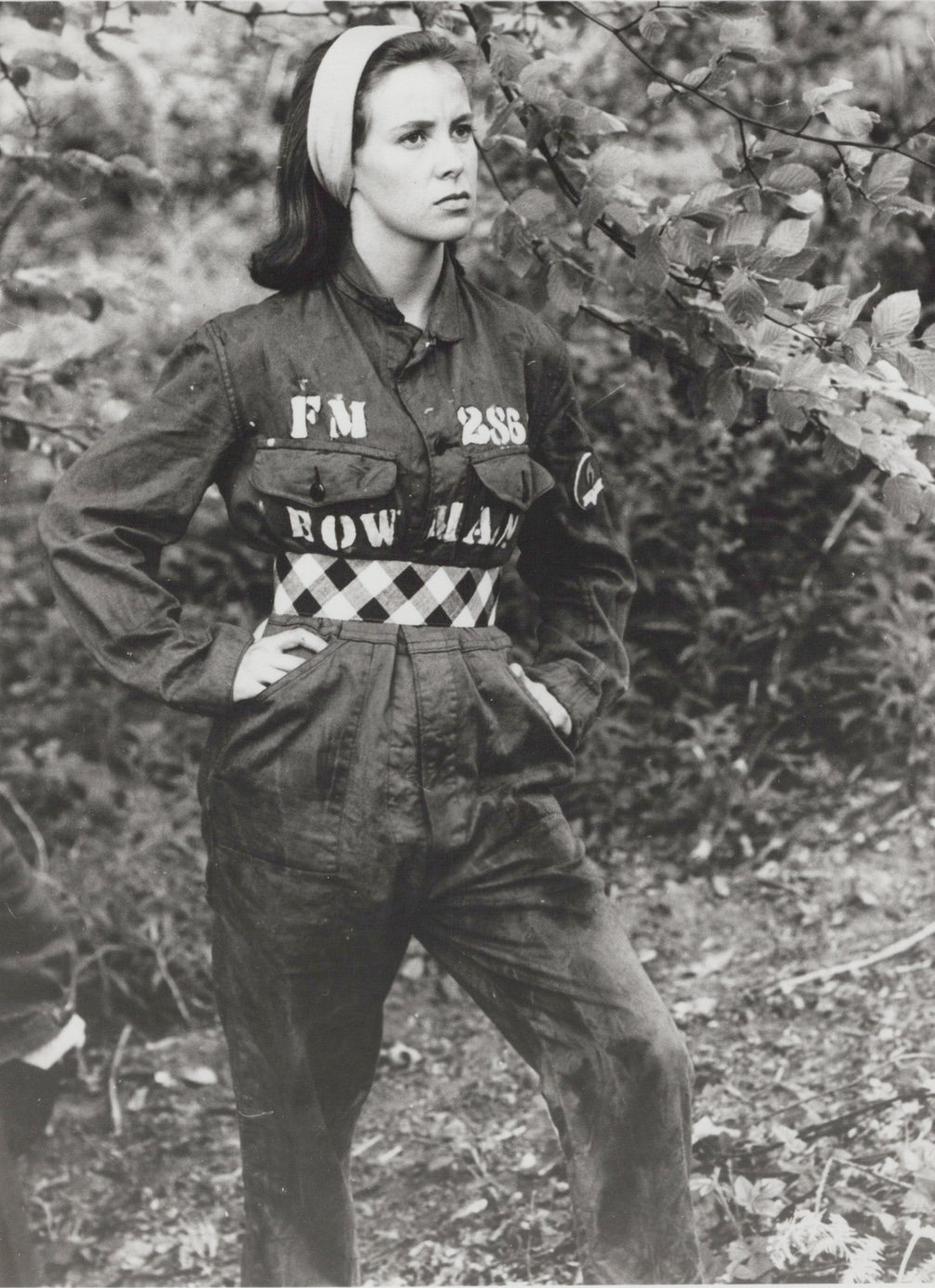
- Julia, portrayed by Jane Merrow in a Theatre 625 production of Nineteen Eighty-Four
- First appearance: Nineteen-Eighty-Four (1949)
- Created by: George Orwell
- Based on: Sonia Brownell
- Portrayed by: Norma Crane (1953); Yvonne Mitchell (1954); Jan Sterling (1956); Jane Merrow (1968); Suzanna Hamilton (1984); Olivia Wilde (Broadway, 2017); Nancy Gustafson (opera, 2005)

In-universe information
- Occupation: Mechanic
- Affiliation: Junior Anti-Sex League
- Significant other: Winston Smith
- Nationality: Oceanic

Julia is a fictional character in George Orwell's 1949 dystopian novel Nineteen Eighty-Four. She is the lover of the novel's protagonist Winston Smith. Her last name is not revealed in the novel. The character is believed by some critics to be based on Orwell's second wife Sonia (née Brownell).

Outwardly, Julia is integrated into the daily life of Oceania, being a propagandist for the Junior Anti-Sex League and fervent participator in the Two Minutes Hate directed against the enemy of the state, Emmanuel Goldstein. She secretly despises the ruling Party and rebels against its directives by engaging in recreational sex with Party members. After handing Winston a love note, they begin a clandestine affair.

Julia has been portrayed in film, radio, theatre and television adaptations of the novel, including Jan Sterling in the 1956 film and Suzanna Hamilton in the 1984 film. She has been influential in other written works, notably Margaret Atwood's dystopian novel, The Handmaid's Tale. Criticism of Orwell's depiction of the character has been based on Julia's lack of character development, her complacency towards the Party's fabrications of historical events and the novel's failure to describe events from her perspective.

== Role in Nineteen Eighty-Four ==
Julia first appears in Nineteen Eighty-Four as an enthusiastic participant in the Two Minutes Hate directed against Emmanuel Goldstein, a Party co-founder who claims the Revolution was betrayed. She is a mechanic working in the Fiction Department of the Ministry of Truth. Winston Smith, a fellow worker, is initially disgusted by her fervour and notices that she wears the sash of the Junior Anti-Sex League. He recalls that women, especially those Julia's age, are among the most fanatical members of the Party. He fantasises about raping and murdering her, and fears that she is a member of the Thought Police prepared to denounce him. Later, Winston spots Julia walking past him. Their gazes meet and Winston, thinking that she is spying on him, contemplates murdering her with a cobblestone.

Four days later, Winston bumps into Julia on her way from the Fiction Department and is handed a love letter and they make arrangements to meet. Winston finds in Julia a fellow thoughtcriminal (as well as a sex criminal). They arrange to meet and have recreational sex outside London, knowing that they will soon be detected and arrested. Julia ambiguously acquires goods such as "real" coffee, theoretically only available to the Inner Party members. When Inner Party member O'Brien drops a hint that he is a member of the mysterious anti-Party Brotherhood, Winston and Julia meet him. O'Brien tests their loyalty by asking whether she and Winston are prepared to separate and never see each other again; Julia shouts "No!". Winston agrees with a heavy heart. Days later, when Winston and Julia are staying in the room above Mr Charrington's shop and have read parts of Goldstein's book, they are arrested by the Thought Police.

O'Brien is really a Party member and torturer for the Thought Police. While interrogating Winston, he claims that Julia immediately betrayed him. During months of torture and brainwashing, Winston surrenders intellectually, but secretly intends to continue hating Big Brother and loving Julia. Winston's resolve to continue loving Julia is burned away when he finally enters Room 101. O'Brien threatens to let rats devour Winston's face, and in utter desperation he begs O'Brien, "Do it to Julia!" Julia meets Winston after they have both been reintegrated into Oceania society. They agree that nothing – not even sex – matters anymore, because their feelings for each other are gone. Winston finally accepts that he loves Big Brother, instead of Julia.

== Characteristics ==
At the age of 26, Julia is younger than Winston and has a confident manner. At the Ministry of Truth she is involved in the production of pornography for distribution to the proles, while in the evenings she volunteers to promote the Junior Anti-Sex League around London. Unlike Winston, Julia is ideologically indifferent and unintellectual. When discussing political issues or presented with passages from Emmanuel Goldstein's banned book The Theory and Practice of Oligarchical Collectivism, she has a tendency to fall asleep.

Julia is frivolous and is willing to break rules; she claims to have slept with various men prior to meeting Winston and likes having luxury items. Professor David Dwan commented that her attitude towards the Party's rules around sex represents Orwell's Freudian approach to repression.

She is more acute than Winston and less susceptible to Party propaganda. In one passage, she contemplates that the war is a lie fabricated to control the masses. Lev Mendes of The New York Times commented that Julia is complacent about the Party's fabrication of reality because it is all she has ever known and this makes her the counterpart to Winston's "energizing despair" in his efforts to uncover the truth.

Dorian Lynskey described Julia as "ingenious but not intellectual". She has learned to survive in a brutal regime without questioning it. An early draft of the novel illustrates the difference between Julia's personality compared to Winston: "It was characteristic of the two of them that whereas it was Winston who dreamed of overthrowing the Party by violent insurrection, it was Julia who knew how to buy coffee on the Black Market." Julia's approach to objective truth contrasts with both O'Brien and Winston, as she does not believe that it matters. She is unconcerned with the past and the future, only existing in the present. Her response to Winston reminding her that Oceania was once at war with Eurasia is that she does not care and that the news is all just lies. Lynskey commented that totalitarian states rely on attitudes like Julia in order to succeed.

== Biographical context ==
Orwell's second wife, Sonia Brownell, has been cited as the inspiration for Julia. Sonia first met Orwell in the early 1940s while working as an editor at the literary magazine Horizon. In the winter of 1945 to 1946, they met again, a year after the death of Orwell's first wife. By the spring of 1947, she had become a significant person in his life. Their relationship developed after Brownell made the offer of caring for his adopted son. She initially rejected his proposal of marriage, after which he returned to the island of Jura in the Hebrides where, while battling with tuberculosis, he wrote Nineteen Eighty Four. While on the island, he wrote to invite her to visit. After finishing the novel he transferred to a sanatorium in Gloucestershire and then removed to University College Hospital in London. When he made the proposal to Sonia again, she accepted. They were married at the hospital bed on 13 October 1949 and their marriage lasted for three months until Orwell's death on 21 January 1950.

Richard Shone, who had known Sonia from 1969, affirmed her as "the girl from the Fiction Department" in The Guardian in reference to a biography of the same name written by Hilary Spurling. Spurling believed that Orwell had returned to Jura in 1947 with the intention of "re-creating" Sonia in the character of Julia and to "take her as his model". D. J. Taylor, an Orwell biographer, agreed that Sonia had similarities to Julia, being around the same age, having a confident personality and having worked in editorial. However, he also noted similarities to aspects of his other lovers, drawing a conclusion that Julia was in fact a composite of several women Orwell had encountered during his life. In The Ministry of Truth, a biography of the novel, Dorian Lynskey did not consider Julia to be a direct representation of Sonia: "Sonia and the dark-haired Julia didn't look alike, and they certainly didn't think alike." He noted some similarities between Sonia and Julia, both being "brisk, direct and extremely practical" but considered this was not enough to draw a comparison, emphasising that at the time of writing the novel, Orwell spent more time with Inez Holden and Celia Paget than with Sonia. Bernard Crick, another biographer of Orwell, did not think that Sonia had much influence on him. He said to The Washington Post, "it was more or less an accident that they married."

Orwell pursued many women throughout his life, making proposals of marriage to several women and being rejected. Taylor described him as "a traditionalist, a masculinist and a chancer" in his attitude towards women. Orwell proposed marriage to Anne Popham amongst others a few months after the death of his first wife, Eileen O'Shaughnessy, to whom he was married from 1936 until her death nine years later. A collection of 50 letters between Orwell and two former girlfriends Eleanor Jaques and Brenda Salkeld handed to the Orwell Archive at University College London revealed that he maintained correspondence with them until his death. Taylor noted that he persistently attempted to arrange country walks in Suffolk with his former lovers and considered this to be the inspiration for Winston's affair in the countryside with Julia.

== Critical response ==
Ben Pimlott considered Julia to be the most engaging character in the novel and thought her sympathetic but contradictory, as she is uninterested in politics but is a free spirit in contrast to Winston. He found her to be a relief from the despondency in the novel, stating that she has a "solidity and a touch of humour that are lacking elsewhere". However, he questioned whether such an uncomplicated character could have remained insusceptible to the Party's propaganda. Bernard Crick commented that Orwell's description of Julia's employment in the Pornosec section of the Fiction department illustrates his satire on the British press that capitalism controls the proles "by cultural debasement".

Orwell's treatment of Julia within the novel has been the subject of some criticism. Jason Arthur of the British publisher Granta commented that despite being one of the few female characters in the novel, Julia's role is confined to "little more than a vehicle for Winston's own political and sexual awakening". Donna Mackay-Smith in The i Paper wrote that the novel is presented solely from the perspective of Winston and critiqued the novel's "misogynist subtext" by highlighting Winston's dislike of women and his expressed desire of murdering Julia. Bethanne Patrick writing for the Los Angeles Times noted that the novel fails to explain why Julia is attracted to Winston or how she rose so quickly within the Party. In The Guardian, Sam Jordison wrote that Julia's love note to Winston was a preposterous event and that her character descends from a spirited young woman to a "thoughtless, near-silent sex object".

Laura Beers detailed Orwell's marginalisation of Julia, noting that although they are both threats to the Party, they are not treated equally by Orwell. Highlighting that Julia is described as a "girl" known only by her first name, she commented that she is defined by her sexuality rather than her intellect. Her lack of interest in politics is noted by Winston who remarks that she is "only a rebel from the waist downwards". Julia was described as a Manic Pixie Dream Girl by Noah Berlatsky of The Atlantic who considered her to be written as an instrument for Winston's pleasure rather than a fully formed character.

Daphne Patai wrote about the female "otherness" in the novel, commenting that while Winston and O'Brien respect each other as worthy opponents, Julia's love is less significant to Winston. She considered all of the novel's female characters to be caricatures rather than individuals but felt that Orwell was unaware of the strong masculine narrative voice in his works. Professors Peter Marks and Simon Potter acknowledged the limitations of Julia's characterisation but argued that this was a symptom of Orwell's intention to focus the novel on Winston, as he had earlier considered naming the novel "The Last Man in Europe". They noted that Orwell had been unsatisfied with the finished novel, describing it as "a good idea ruined", which he attributed to his illness.

=== Impact and influence ===
Margaret Atwood said that she was directly influenced by Nineteen Eighty Four when writing The Handmaid's Tale. While noting that most dystopian novels had been written by men, she wanted to write a dystopian novel from a feminine perspective: "I wanted to try a dystopia from the female point of view – the world according to Julia, as it were."

American author Sandra Newman wrote a retelling of the story from the perspective of Julia with the approval of Orwell's son, Richard Blair. Feeling dissatisfied with Orwell's treatment of Julia, she wanted to fill in the novel's unanswered questions: "people forget that Winston fantasises about killing her on two occasions." Newman opined that Orwell intended to demonstrate that Winston's misogyny was caused by the Party's sexual repression, but she felt that Orwell's treatment was too distant and that he had failed in "inhabiting his female characters".

=== In popular culture ===
The American rock band mewithoutYou released the single "Julia (or, 'Holy to the LORD' on the Bells of Horses)" in 2018, which is titled after the character.

== Adaptations ==
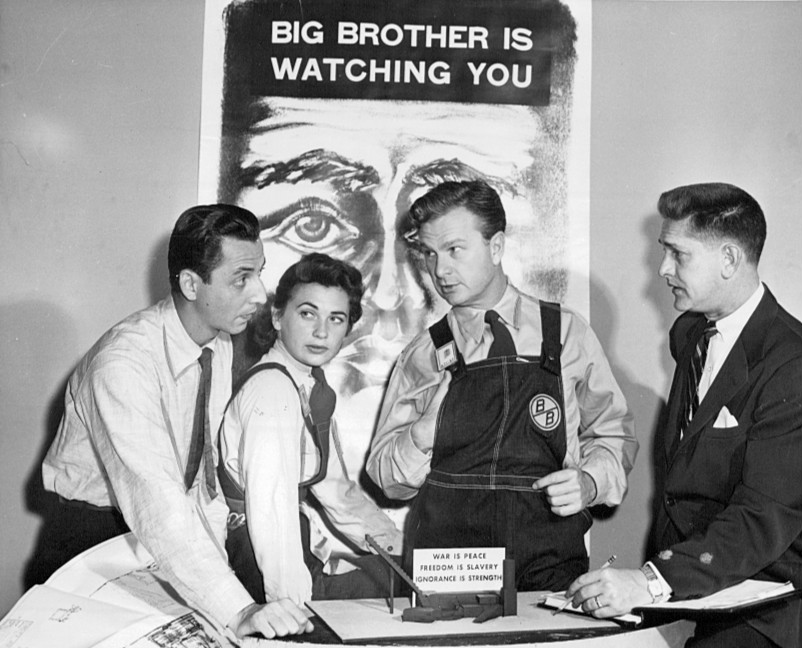
Norma Crane portraying Julia in the Studio One 1953 television adaptation with Eddie Albert as Winston

- The United States Steel Hour: "1984", radio adaptation from 1953. Marian Seldes
- Studio One: "1984", television adaptation from 1953: Norma Crane
- Nineteen Eighty-Four, television adaptation from 1954: Yvonne Mitchell
- Nineteen Eighty-Four, radio adaptation from 1965. Sylvia Syms
- 1984, film adaptation directed by Michael Anderson in 1956: Jan Sterling
- Theatre 625: "The World of George Orwell: 1984", television adaptation from 1965: Jane Merrow
- Nineteen Eighty-Four, radio adaptation from 1967. Diana Olsson

Actor Suzanna Hamilton portrayed Julia in the 1984 film Nineteen Eighty-Four

- Nineteen Eighty-Four, film adaptation directed by Michael Radford in 1984: Suzanna Hamilton
- Actresses who have played Julia in the 2013 Stage Adaptation have included Hara Yannas, Catrin Stewart, Olivia Wilde, and Ursula Mills.
- 1984! The Musical! 2020 Musical: Anna Della Marta
- The Real George Orwell: Nineteen Eighty-Four, radio adaptation from 2013. Pippa Nixon
- The Sisterhood (2023) Katherine Bradley
- Julia, a novel released in 2023 by Sandra Newman
- 1984, an Audible audio adaptation released in April 2024 featuring Cynthia Erivo as Julia
- 1984, theatre adaptation in 2024 directed by Lindsay Posner, with Eleanor Wyld as Julia
