= Two Minutes Hate =

Daily mass ritual in Nineteen Eighty-Four

In the dystopian novel Nineteen Eighty-Four (1949) by George Orwell, the Two Minutes Hate is the daily period during which members of the Outer and Inner Party of Oceania must watch a film depicting Emmanuel Goldstein, the principal enemy of the state and loudly voice their hatred for him followed by declaring their love for the Party leader Big Brother.

The political purpose of the Two Minutes Hate is to allow the citizens of Oceania to vent their personal hatred towards a political enemy. In redirecting the participants' emotions away from the Party's governance of Oceania, the Party minimises thoughtcrime and critical thought while exerting ultimate control of the population.

Various real-world events have been compared to Orwell's description of the Two Minutes Hate, including radio and television broadcasts used for the purposes of mass propaganda.

== Role in Nineteen Eighty-Four ==
In the novel Nineteen Eighty-Four, the ruling party of Oceania uses mass media to control public opinion in order to maintain absolute power. The Party employs the use of a telescreen, a device that resembles an opaque mirror, which is both a mechanism of surveillance and a device for transmitting propaganda. Orwell describes the Two Minutes Hate when Winston Smith, the protagonist of the novel, witnesses the transmission on the telescreen from his seat in the audience.

The event begins with a horrible grinding, screeching sound that signifies the beginning of the hate and ends with an image of Big Brother, the figurehead of the Party, to restore calm. The transmission involves the image of Emmanuel Goldstein, the enemy of the state, being projected onto the screen, which causes hissing from the audience, creates an emotional frenzy of hatred that reaches a climax, which transforms into ecstasy when the image of Big Brother appears and the Party's slogans are displayed. The purpose of the Two Minutes Hate is to emotionally involve the audience while ensuring the absence of critical thought.

The hate session includes the participants, such as the character Julia, throwing things at the telescreen at the sight of Goldstein. During the Two Minutes Hate, the image of Goldstein metamorphoses into the face of a bleating sheep, then changes to an enemy Eurasian soldier who charges towards the viewers while firing his sub-machine gun. The face of the soldier finally melts into the face of Big Brother.

At the end of the two-minute session of hatred, the members of the Party ritualistically chant "B-B . . . B-B . . . B-B . . . B-B." To maintain the extreme emotions provoked in the Two Minutes Hate sessions, the Party created Hate Week, a week-long festival of hatreds.

Goldstein is described by Orwell as "the primal traitor" of Oceania. While the audience in his workplace respond with hysterical rage to the image of Goldstein, Winston's reaction is a feeling of horror, which creates a hatred not of Goldstein but of Big Brother. This results in him subconsciously and automatically writing the repeated phrase DOWN WITH BIG BROTHER in capital letters. This resistance is accompanied by his knowledge that he has committed thoughtcrime and doomed himself to certain death.

During the Two Minutes Hate, Winston experiences shifting feelings of hatred, at one point directing his enmity towards Julia, fuelled by the paralysing fear embedded in him by the state. Orwell writes: "the rage that one felt was an abstract, undirected emotion which could be switched from one object to another like the flame of a blowlamp".

The telescreen in the Two Minutes Hate is a significant mechanism for enforcing compliance in the Oceanian population. Orwell explains that it "received and transmitted simultaneously" and cannot be turned off so that an individual is under constant surveillance both in their private home and in public. The result of this surveillance is that the population is conditioned to respond to the telescreen in a particular manner. During the Two Minutes Hate, Orwell writes: "The horrible thing about the Two Minutes Hate was not that one was obliged to act a part, but that it was impossible to avoid joining in. Within thirty seconds any pretence was unnecessary".

== Critical analysis ==
The Party's use of the Two Minutes Hate was described as a typical technique of mass persuasion by W. Russel Gray, who highlighted that the Party exerts control over the masses by exploiting the bandwagon effect. Individuals within Oceania conform to social behaviour and groups and attend events like the Two Minutes Hate and Hate Week competitively. The Party reinforces the individual's correct attitudes by creating member groups such as the Inner Party, Outer Party and Junior Anti-Sex League to promote uniformity.

Daphne Patai wrote that the Two Minutes Hate is a part of the Party's competitive game in the pursuit of power. Winston's torturer, O'Brien, explains to him that power is asserted by making an individual suffer and describes an image of a boot stamping on a human face forever. Orwell had written about the hatred generated at international sporting events in his 1945 essay "The Sporting Spirit" and described nationalism as "the lunatic modern habit of identifying oneself with large power units and seeing everything in terms of competitive prestige".

In his essay, Orwell noted: "Even when the spectators don't intervene physically, they try to influence the game by cheering their own side and 'rattling' opposing players with boos and insults. Serious sport has nothing to do with fair play. It is bound up with hatred, jealousy, boastfulness, disregard of all rules and sadistic pleasure in witnessing violence: in other words it is war minus the shooting." In the novel, hatred is generated not by a sport but by a political enemy.

Naomi Jacobs considered the human body to be at the core of Orwell's expression of totalitarian power. The Oceanian population is characteristically thin, ill and degraded. While the Party's totalitarian propaganda typically projects an image of strength and productivity, the individual exists with restricted food and limited pleasures. This denial intensifies the feeling of ecstasy experienced by the participants towards Big Brother during the Two Minutes Hate. Only the love of Big Brother is permitted, or alternatively the sadistic hatred towards Goldstein. Jacobs commented that by involving the citizens with fervent declarations of loyalty, the Party effectively distracts the oppressed population from its many discomforts.

The Two Minutes Hate was described by Erika Gottleib as a ritual of public worship, designed to impress polarised ideas of good and evil on the participants. She commented that the Party's use of the image of Big Brother during the event is as a supernatural divine being, while Goldstein is projected as a satanic individual. As Oceania is said to be permanently at war with the other superstates, it projects Big Brother as a superhuman being who gains repeated victories over the ever-changing enemies of the state and this is necessary for totalitarian power over the masses.

== Comparisons ==
The Two Minutes Hate was compared to the radio broadcasts of speeches by Joseph Stalin in the 1940s by Azary Messerer, who recalled that the population across the Soviet Union would freeze to listen whenever the announcements took place. Stalin's statements were made by the Soviet radio announcer Yuri Levitan and were broadcast several times a day during World War II.

Sandra Newman likened the Two Minutes Hate to the broadcasts by Radio Télévision Libre des Mille Collines, a Rwandan radio station that began broadcasting in 1993 and projected hate propaganda and incited Rwandan genocide against the Tutsi.

In a 2012 blog post, a Ukrainian TV manager said that attacks on the Russian government's liberal opposition by Russian state-owned Russia-1 reminded him of the "two minutes of hate". The BBC reported that the Russian channel used psychological conditioning techniques in its broadcasts to incite aggression and hatred in its viewers towards the Ukrainian army.

American propaganda by the Committee on Public Information during the First World War has also been compared to the propaganda in the "two minutes hate" programme.

== See also ==
- Brainwashing
- Classical conditioning
- Enemy of the people
- Hate speech
- Stochastic terrorism
- Struggle session
