= 1984 (1956 film) =

1956 British film by Michael Anderson

- Theatrical release poster
- Directed by: Michael Anderson
- Screenplay by: Ralph Gilbert Bettison; William Templeton
- Based on: Nineteen Eighty-Four by George Orwell
- Produced by: N. Peter Rathvon
- Starring: Edmond O'Brien; Michael Redgrave; Michael Ripper; Donald Pleasence; Jan Sterling
- Cinematography: C. M. Pennington-Richards
- Edited by: Bill Lewthwaite
- Music by: Malcolm Arnold
- Production company: Holiday Film Productions Ltd.
- Distributed by: Columbia Pictures
- Release dates: 6 March 1956 (UK); September 1956 (US)
- Running time: 90 minutes
- Country: United Kingdom
- Language: English
- Box office: £80,073

1984 is a 1956 British science fiction film based on the 1949 novel Nineteen Eighty-Four by George Orwell, depicting a totalitarian future of a dystopian society. The film followed a previous 1953 American Westinghouse Studio One adaptation starring Eddie Albert, and a 1954 BBC-TV made-for-TV adaptation that starred Peter Cushing and Donald Pleasence.

Shot in black-and-white, 1984 was directed by Michael Anderson and starring Edmond O'Brien as protagonist Winston Smith, and featured Donald Pleasence, Jan Sterling, Michael Ripper and Michael Redgrave. It was released in the UK on March 6, 1956, and in the US in September 1956. It played in the US on a double feature with The Gamma People (1956).

== Plot ==
In the mid-1960s, a nuclear war and devastation of Earth gave rise to three superstates: Oceania, Eurasia, and Eastasia. By 1984, London, with its bomb-proof ministry, is designated as the capital of Airstrip One, a province of Oceania, controlled by one all-powerful Party, embodied by the figurehead Big Brother.

In the spring of 1984, Winston Smith, a member of the semi-elite Outer Party, encounters Julia, a woman he suspects may be a member of the Thought Police. Winston returns to his apartment, where an electronic surveillance eye examines the contents of his briefcase. Smuggling a small black diary past the eye, Winston begins to write down the subversive thoughts he fears to say aloud. Winston's reverie is interrupted when Selina Parsons, a little girl who lives next door, enters his apartment to practice denouncing him as a traitor. Robert Parsons, Selina's father, invites Winston to join him for a drink at the local Chestnut Tree café.

At the cafe, Winston and Parsons spot Rutherford and Jones, two Outer Party traitors who have been rehabilitated by the government's Ministry of Love. Afterward, Winston goes to a junk shop to wonder at the objects of yesteryear that are now deemed worthless. Julia enters the shop, sending Winston scurrying into the street, where he is stopped by the police and ordered to report to Administration the next morning.

At the Administration the next day, a party officer reprimands Winston for socializing with the common masses. Winston then proceeds to his job at the Records Department at the Ministry of Truth. When Winston discovers a photo that would prove Jones and Rutherford innocent, O'Connor, Winston's superior, instructs him to destroy it.

That evening, at a political rally, Julia passes Winston a note professing her love to him. Later, they arrange to meet on Sunday in a meadow outside London, far from the prying microphones and monitors of Big Brother. There, they touch each other, an act prohibited by the Anti-Sex League, and proceed to make love.

Two weeks later, Winston proposes renting a room at the junk store, one of the few places free of the omnipresent monitors. In the sanctity of their quarters, Winston confides that he believes O'Connor may be a member of the Underground.

One night, Winston finds a note written in O'Connor's handwriting that reads "down with Big Brother". Convinced that O'Connor represents their only hope to break free of the tyranny of Big Brother, Julia and Winston go to his apartment and declare that they want to join the Underground. O'Connor instructs Winston to carry an empty briefcase with him at all times.

A few days later, during a rally to launch Hate Week, a man switches briefcases with Winston. When Winston opens the case, he finds a copy of a treatise by the alleged leader of the Underground. Back in their secret room, Julia muses that only love can defeat Big Brother. At that moment, a telescreen hidden behind a mirror condemns Julia's sentiments and Thought Police burst in to arrest them.

At the Ministry of Love, Winston is confined in a pit-like room as Parsons gets thrown into the pit, his daughter having denounced him for muttering in his sleep "Down with Big Brother." After Parsons is taken away, O'Connor enters the room and reveals himself to be a covert agent of the state. Under O'Connor's direction, Winston is subjected to a brainwashing campaign. Still resistant after a series of electroshock treatments, Winston declares that the party will never eradicate his love for Julia.

After realizing that Winston's biggest fear is getting eaten alive by rats, O'Connor confines him in a room filled with the squealing rodents, causing Winston to break down and beg them to feed Julia to the rodents instead. When O'Connor authorizes his release, Winston mindlessly wanders through the streets, where he spots a cold, indifferent Julia. Big Brother broadcasts that the Eurasian army has been routed in battle and that the war will be soon over; he finds Julia gone after he looks back at where she had been standing. In the final shot, a "rehabilitated" and brainwashed Winston fervently joins the crowd while cheering "Long Live Big Brother!"

An alternate ending was also shot and produced, in which Winston rebels against his brainwashing and starts to shout "Down with Big Brother!" before being shot down. Julia runs to his aid and suffers the same fate.

== Cast ==
- Edmond O'Brien as Winston Smith of the Outer Party
- Michael Redgrave as O'Connor of the Inner Party
- Jan Sterling as Julia of the Outer Party
- David Kossoff as Charrington
- Mervyn Johns as Jones
- Donald Pleasence as Parsons
- Carol Wolveridge as Selina
- Ernest Clark as Outer Party Announcer
- Patrick Allen as Inner Party Official
- Ronan O'Casey as Rutherford, the prisoner of Room 101
- Michael Ripper as Outer Party Orator
- Ewen Solon as Outer Party Orator
- Kenneth Griffith as Prisoner

== Production ==
=== Development ===
The film was produced under the leadership of N. Peter Rathvon, an American film executive and former president of RKO Pictures. In 1954, Peter Cushing and André Morell starred in a BBC-TV television adaptation which was extremely popular with British audiences, leading to the production of the 1956 film version. Donald Pleasence had also appeared in the BBC television version, playing the character of Syme, which for the film was amalgamated with that of Parsons. The script was co-written by William Templeton, who had previously adapted the novel for the US Studio One TV series in 1953. During the development process, the character O'Brien, the antagonist, was renamed "O'Connor", due to the shared surname of the actor Edmond O'Brien. Emmanuel Goldstein is changed to "Kalador". Like the earlier film adaptation of Animal Farm, 1984 was secretly funded by the Central Intelligence Agency. The film received a 100,000 dollar subsidy from the U.S. Information Agency. Just like the Animal Farm adaptation, the 1984 film altered the book ending.

== Release ==
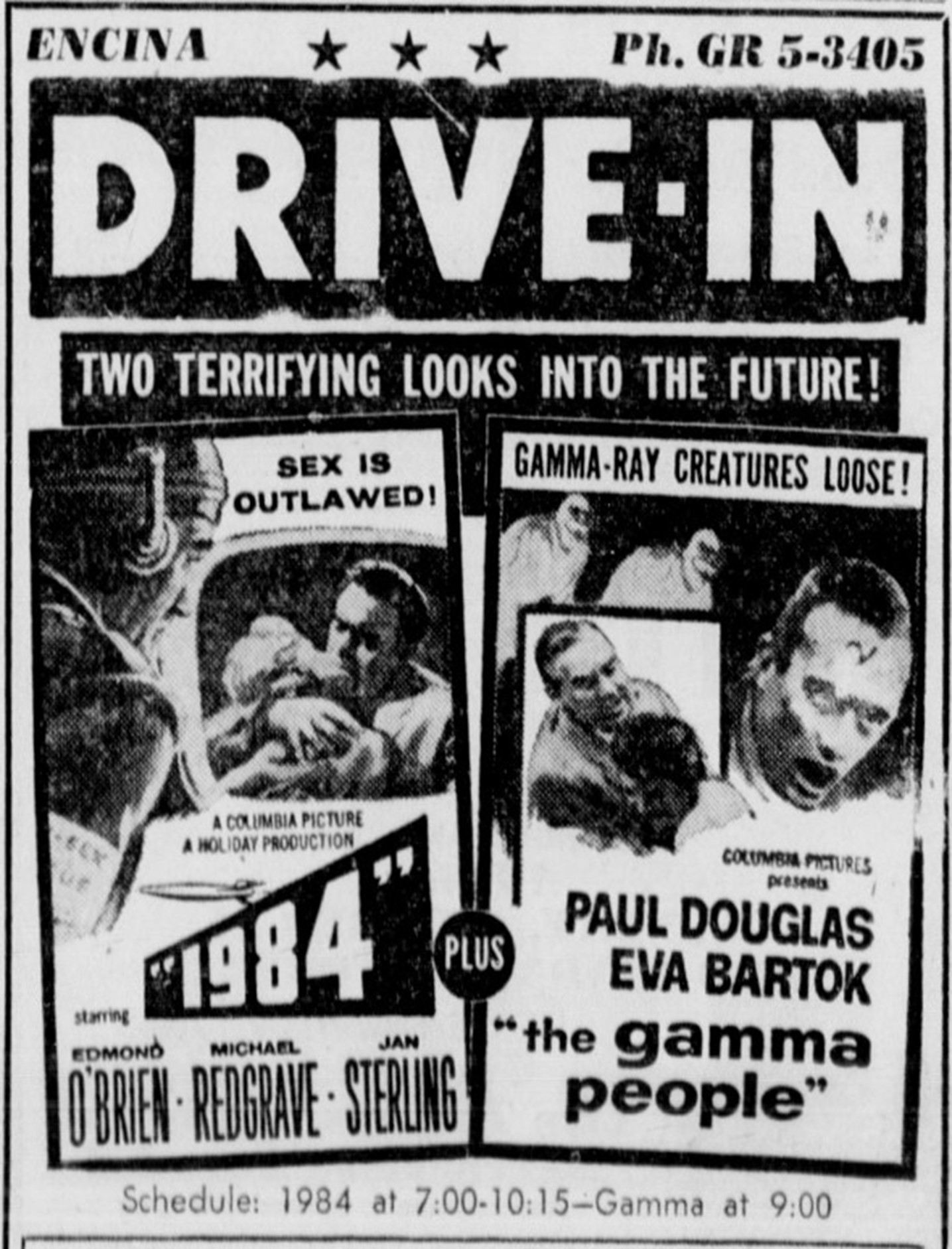
Drive-in double-feature advertisement

For the US market, 1984 was distributed in 1956 on a double feature with another British science fiction film, The Gamma People.

=== Reception ===
The New York Times reviewer A.H. Weiler called this film adaptation "a stark, sober and thoughtful, if not altogether persuasive, film." He said the "director and the scenarists have adapted the book 'freely'. But they have retained its essential spirit and ideas in the film." A Boston Globe reviewer said that "the film had the same sense of bleak horror and black apprehension that Orwell developed when freedom was allowed to die." The Encyclopedia of Science Fiction, however, compared the film to the BBC adaptation, but stated that it was "lifeless".

== See also ==
- List of films featuring surveillance
- List of films that depict class struggle
