= Hate Week =

Fictional event in Nineteen Eighty-Four

In the dystopian novel Nineteen Eighty-Four (1949), by Orwell, Hate Week is a psychological operation designed to increase as much as possible the population's hatred of the current enemy of the totalitarian Party, whichever of the two opposing super-states that may be.

== Plot summary ==
During one particular Hate Week, Oceania switched allies while a public speaker is in the middle of a sentence, although the disruption was minimal: the posters against the previous enemy were deemed to be "sabotage" of Hate Week conducted by Emmanuel Goldstein and his supporters, summarily torn down by the crowd, and quickly replaced with propaganda against the new enemy, thus demonstrating the ease with which the Party directs the hatred of its members. This ease of direction could also be partially attributed to the similarity in the terms "Eastasia" and "Eurasia" because they are more easily confused. All citizens of Oceania are expected to show appropriate enthusiasm during Hate Week, as well as the daily Two Minutes Hate. While participation in this event is not legally required, avoiding or refusing to do so is said to make one appear suspicious to the Thought Police, generally resulting in the vaporisation (execution and damnatio memoriae) of the perpetrator. This ensures that they are against the opposing party and still allied with Big Brother.

Hate Week is celebrated in late summer. The events during that time include waxwork displays, military parades, speeches and lectures. New slogans are also coined and new songs are written. The theme of the Hate Week is called the Hate Song. It is mentioned that a unit from the Fiction Department was assigned to make atrocity pamphlets (falsified reports of atrocities committed by Oceania's enemies against her) designed to stimulate Oceania's populace further into enraged frenzy against all enemies. The aggregate effect of Hate Week thus is to excite the populace to such a point that they "would unquestionably have torn [captured enemy soldiers] to pieces" if given the opportunity.

Hate Week is introduced to the reader for the first time in the second paragraph of the first page of Nineteen Eighty-Four; however, at this point in time, readers have no idea what Hate Week is. "It was part of the economy drive in preparation for Hate Week."

== Cultural impact ==
"Hate week" has been adopted by theorists and pundits as a comparison to real life efforts to demonise an enemy of the state. Soviet Literary theorist John Rodden notes that "Hate Week" depicted by George Orwell's 1984 novel anticipates some of the anti-American events in the Soviet Union that followed. Scott Boulding argues similarities between the dystopian hate week and Stalinist efforts to supplant religion with devotional services to the state.

== See also ==
- Propaganda
