= Nineteen Eighty-Four (British TV programme) =

1954 British TV film

- Opening title
- Genre: Drama
- Based on: Nineteen Eighty-Four by George Orwell
- Written by: Nigel Kneale
- Directed by: Rudolph Cartier
- Starring: Peter Cushing; André Morell; Yvonne Mitchell; Donald Pleasence
- Narrated by: Richard Williams
- Composer: John Hotchkis
- Country of origin: United Kingdom
- Original language: English
- No. of episodes: 1

Production
- Producer: Rudolph Cartier
- Production locations: London, England
- Running time: 105–107 minutes

Original release
- Network: BBC
- Release: 12 December 1954

Nineteen Eighty-Four is a British television adaptation of the 1949 novel of the same name by George Orwell, originally broadcast on BBC Television as part of BBC Sunday-Night Theatre on 12 December 1954. The production proved to be hugely controversial, with questions asked in Parliament and many viewer complaints over its supposed subversive nature and its graphic depiction of totalitarianism. It starred Peter Cushing (as Winston Smith), Yvonne Mitchell, Donald Pleasence and André Morell.

Described as television's first "watercooler moment" by The Telegraph, the adaptation was watched by seven million people in the UK. In a 2000 poll of industry experts conducted by the British Film Institute to determine the 100 Greatest British Television Programmes of the 20th century, Nineteen Eighty-Four was ranked in seventy-third position.

== Background ==
Orwell's novel was adapted for television by Nigel Kneale. The previous year he had created the character of Professor Bernard Quatermass for the science-fiction serial The Quatermass Experiment. The adaptation was produced and directed by the Rudolph Cartier, perhaps the BBC's best producer-director of the 1950s who was always adventurous artistically and technically. Cartier, a veteran of the UFA film studios in 1930s Germany who had fled the Nazi regime for Britain in 1936, had worked with Kneale the previous year on The Quatermass Experiment and was a veteran of many television drama productions.

It was Cartier's work on Quatermass that had prompted the BBC's Head of Drama, Michael Barry, to ask him to work on an adaptation of the novel, having shown his abilities with literary sources in a version of Wuthering Heights, again with Kneale handling the scripting. The BBC had purchased the rights to a television version of Nineteen Eighty-Four soon after its publication in 1949, with Kenneth Tynan having apparently originally been keen on adapting the work. The first version of the script, produced in late 1953, was written by Hugh Faulks, in consultation with Orwell's widow Sonia Brownell, but when Cartier joined in January 1954 he demanded that Kneale be allowed to handle the adaptation. This and other complexities of production meant that the April airdate – which would have been about 30 years before the novel was set – had to be postponed.

== Cast and crew ==
The role of Winston Smith was taken by Peter Cushing, one of his first major roles. Cartier cast him after having been impressed with his performance in a BBC production of Anastasia the previous year. Cushing went on to become a film star, as would his co-star Donald Pleasence, who played Syme. Pleasence was the only member of the cast present in the 1956 feature film adaptation of the story, playing an amalgamation of Syme and Parsons with the latter's name.

Other cast members included Yvonne Mitchell, who had starred in the Kneale/Cartier Wuthering Heights, as Julia, and André Morell as O'Brien. Wilfrid Brambell, later known for his roles in Steptoe and Son and as Paul McCartney's grandfather in A Hard Day's Night, appeared in two roles, as the old man Winston speaks with in the pub and as a prisoner later on when Winston is incarcerated. Nigel Kneale, who had briefly acted in the 1940s before turning to scriptwriting, had a small voice-over role as an announcer. The face of Big Brother was Roy Oxley, a member of the BBC design department whose inclusion was something of an in-joke on the part of the production team.

The composer of the incidental music for the programme was John Hotchkis, who insisted on a larger than usual orchestra to perform the piece.

=== Cast ===
- Peter Cushing as Winston Smith
- André Morell as O'Brien
- Yvonne Mitchell as Julia
- Donald Pleasence as Syme
- Arnold Diamond as Emmanuel Goldstein
- Campbell Gray as Parsons
- Hilda Fenemore as Mrs. Parsons
- Pamela Grant as Parsons' Girl
- Keith Davis as Parsons' Boy
- Janet Barrow as Woman Supervisor
- Wilfrid Brambell as Old Man / Thin Prisoner
- Leonard Sachs as Mr. Charrington
- Sydney Bromley as Waiter
- Richard Williams as Narrator

== Production ==
Until the early 1960s, the vast majority of the BBC's television was performed live. Nonetheless, there was a certain degree of pre-shooting in the form of inserts on film, which could be played into the studio and broadcast as part of the play to cover changes of scene or show location material which would have been impossible to mount live in the studio. Initial filming for Nineteen Eighty-Four took place on 10 November 1954 in Studio B of Alexandra Palace (even by then all but abandoned as a venue for shooting drama, although it housed the news and later the Open University for the next thirty years), with footage of the Two Minutes' Hate and some of the canteen scenes being filmed there.

Further location shooting took place on 18 November which were exterior scenes featuring Smith's travels in the proletarian sector. According to Peter Cushing, speaking on Late Night Line-Up in 1965, these scenes were filmed on the demolition site that became BBC Television Centre. Following the filming, rehearsals for the cast began at Mary Ward Settlement, Tavistock Place from 22 November (moving to 60 Paddington Street from 29 November). During these rehearsals, the cast memorised their lines and cues as important in a live television production as in a stage play.

The cast and crew moved to Studio D at the BBC's Lime Grove Studios on Saturday, 11 December 1954, for a full camera rehearsal and run-through. Rehearsals continued the following day until shortly before transmission, which began at 20:37 Sunday, 12 December, and continued for the best part of two hours.

Kneale's script was a largely faithful adaptation of the novel as far as was practical. The writer made some small additions, the most notable being the creation of a sequence in which O'Brien observes Julia at work in PornoSec and reads a small segment from one of the erotic novels being written by the machines.

== Reaction ==
The play provoked something of an upset to a fledgling television audience. There were complaints about the "horrific" content (particularly the Room 101 scene where Smith is threatened with torture by rats for daring to rebel) and the "subversive" nature of the play. Most were worried by the depiction of a totalitarian regime controlling the population's freedom of thought with Big Brother looking directly into the camera. There was also a report in the Daily Express newspaper of 42-year-old Beryl Merfin of Herne Bay collapsing and dying as she watched the production, under the headline "Wife dies as she watches", allegedly from the shock of what she had seen. An anonymous reviewer in The Times wrote: "Inevitably, in a dramatic presentation of the book much of the irony is lost; and the weakness of this television version was that concentrating on the action it reduced the ideological explanation so drastically that it robbed the story of at least half its power". It was a "pictorial simplification" of "Orwell's vision". The writer, however, admired the performances of Cushing, Mitchell and Morell. The Manchester Guardian reviewer defended the BBC for screening the drama, while The Daily Worker, a communist newspaper, described it as a "Tory guttersnipe’s view of socialism".

Political reaction was divided, with several early day motions and amendments tabled in Parliament. One motion, signed by five MPs, deplored "the tendency, evident in recent British Broadcasting Corporation television programmes, notably on Sunday evenings, to pander to sexual and sadistic tastes". An amendment was tabled which sought to make the motion now deplore "the tendency of honourable members to attack the courage and enterprise of the British Broadcasting Corporation in presenting plays and programmes capable of appreciation by adult minds, on Sunday evenings and other occasions." It was signed by five MPs. Another amendment added "but is thankful that the freedom of the individual still permits viewers to switch off and, due to the foresight of her Majesty's Government, will soon permit a switch-over to be made to more appropriate programmes." A second motion signed by six MPs, applauded "the sincere attempts of the BBC. to bring home to the British people the logical and soul-destroying consequences of the surrender of their freedom" and calling attention to the fact that "many of the inhuman practices depicted in the play Nineteen Eighty-Four are already in common use under totalitarian régimes." Even the Queen and Prince Philip made it known that they had watched and enjoyed the play.

Amidst objections the BBC went ahead with a complete live restaging on Thursday 16 December. This was introduced live on camera by Head of Drama Michael Barry, who had already appeared on the topical news programme Panorama on 15 December to defend the production. The seven million viewers who watched the Thursday performance was the largest television audience in the UK since the Coronation the previous year.

At the time, television images could only be preserved on film by using a special recording apparatus (known as "telerecording" in the UK and "kinescoping" in the US) but was used sparingly in Britain for preservation and not for pre-recording. It is thus the second performance, one of the earliest surviving British television dramas, that is preserved in the archives. Cushing felt, however, that this second performance 'lacked the spontaneity and inspiration of the first, suffering from the furore provoked during those three intervening days.'

== The Goon Show parody ==
Spike Milligan wrote a parody of Nineteen Eighty-Four for The Goon Show entitled 1985, broadcast on 4 January 1955. The cast of characters included Worker 846 Winston Seagoon (Harry Secombe), Miss Sfnut (Peter Sellers) and Worker 213 Eccles (Milligan); Big Brother was replaced by the Big Brother Corporation (i.e. the BBC) and Goldstein's revolution by Horace Minikstein's Independent Television Army (i.e. the Independent Television Authority). Jokes included such stabs at the BBC as:

Announcer (Sellers): "Attention BBC workers! Lunch is now being served in the BBC Canteen. Doctors are standing by."

Seagoon is tortured in Room 101 by being forced to listen to clips from Ray's a Laugh, Life with the Lyons and the singing of Harry Secombe. Unlike the original script, Seagoon is freed from Room 101 and the ITA overthrows the BBC after a three-day phone call and a £10 bribe. However, when Seagoon hears the ITA's output, he wants the BBC brought back.

The programme was such a success that the script was performed again on 8 February 1955. This was not a repeat – it was a new broadcast of the same script with minor changes. One change was the recorded addition of John Snagge as the BBC announcer previously portrayed by Sellers.

The first version exists in pristine form in the BBC archives, the second performance only as a lower-quality off-air recording, which excludes the first five minutes of the programme and both musical interludes, preserving about 18 minutes of material.

== Legacy ==
It was twenty-three years before the 35mm telerecording of the 16 December performance received a repeat broadcast, in 1977. Another proposed repeat as part of the BBC's fiftieth anniversary of television celebrations in 1986 was overruled by the producers of the 1984 John Hurt/Richard Burton feature film, who felt that earlier versions would affect income for their film. The BBC was permitted to show the play again in 1994 on BBC Two, as a tribute to the recently deceased Cartier and again in June 2003 on digital station BBC Four as part of the George Orwell centenary celebrations.

Kneale's adaptation was produced again by the BBC, with some modifications in 1965. Starring David Buck, Joseph O'Conor, Jane Merrow and Cyril Shaps, it was broadcast in BBC2's Theatre 625 anthology series as part of a season of Orwell adaptations sub-titled The World of George Orwell, on 28 November 1965. Long believed lost, on 12 September 2010 it was announced that a copy had been located at the American Library of Congress, although an approximately seven-minute segment in the middle was unrecoverable from the NTSC video tape recording. It was recovered amongst a hoard of over 80 lost British television episodes dating from 1957 to 1970. In 1965, a radio adaptation was broadcast on the BBC Home Service with Patrick Troughton, soon to become the Second Doctor in Doctor Who. This radio version was properly archived and has survived.

Scenes from Nineteen Eighty-Four, along with the 1954 adaptation of Animal Farm, were featured in "The Two Winstons", the final episode of Simon Schama's programme A History of Britain.

== Broadcast history ==
- BBC Television, 12 December 1954, live – not recorded.
- BBC Television, 16 December 1954, live – exists as a 35mm film telerecording.
- BBC2, 28 November 1965, new production of an updated version of the 1954 script. Exists as an NTSC videotape copy, although 7 minutes is missing.
- BBC2, 3 August 1977, repeat of 16 December 1954 telerecording.
- BBC Two, 1 July 1994, repeat of 16 December 1954 telerecording, commemorating the death of Rudolph Cartier.
- BBC Four, 14 June 2003, repeat of 16 December 1954 telerecording.
- BBC Four, 17 November 2024, repeat of 16 December 1954 telerecording.

== Home media ==
In March 2014, the play was included in a "Classic Horror Volume 1" DVD release alongside Nosferatu, Hunchback of Notre Dame and The Phantom of the Opera.

In April 2022, the BFI released a standalone Blu-ray + DVD combo containing a new High Definition transfer of the play.

== Bibliography ==
=== Books ===
- Fulton, Roger (1997). The Encyclopedia of TV Science Fiction (2nd ed.). London: Boxtree Books. ISBN 0-7522-1150-1.
- Jacobs, Jason (2000). The Intimate Screen: Early British Television Drama (1st ed.). Oxford: Oxford University Press. ISBN 0-19-874233-9.

=== Magazines ===
- Pixley, Andrew (Jan. 2003). Nineteen Eighty-Four: Big Brother is Watching You. TV Zone, p. 50-54.

== See also ==
- Nineteen Eighty-Four, 1953 American television adaptation
