= Doublethink =

Concept in Nineteen Eighty-Four of accepting two contradictory statements

Doublethink is a process of indoctrination in which subjects are expected to simultaneously accept two conflicting beliefs as truth, often at odds with their own memory or sense of reality. George Orwell coined the term doublethink as part of the fictional language of Newspeak in his 1949 dystopian novel Nineteen Eighty-Four.

== Role in Nineteen Eighty-Four ==
According to Nineteen Eighty-Four by George Orwell, doublethink is:

To know and not to know, to be conscious of complete truthfulness while telling carefully constructed lies, to hold simultaneously two opinions which cancelled out, knowing them to be contradictory and believing in both of them, to use logic against logic, to repudiate morality while laying claim to it, to believe that democracy was impossible and that the Party was the guardian of democracy, to forget whatever it was necessary to forget, then to draw it back into memory again at the moment when it was needed, and then promptly to forget it again, and above all, to apply the same process to the process itself—that was the ultimate subtlety: consciously to induce unconsciousness, and then, once again, to become unconscious of the act of hypnosis you had just performed. Even to understand the word—doublethink—involved the use of doublethink.

Within the totalitarian regime of Oceania, doublethink is a necessary strategy in maintaining the ruling Party's absolute power over the population. The Inner Party member O'Brien explains: "The Party seeks power entirely for its own sake." In order to ensure that the Party remains infallible and the inaccuracies of its changing Party line are ignored, a system of contradictions is used to hide these inconsistencies and disguise the Party's true motive of absolute power. Three widely accepted examples of doublethink in Oceania are the repeated contradictory slogans: "WAR IS PEACE; FREEDOM IS SLAVERY; IGNORANCE IS STRENGTH."

Theo Finigan described doublethink as an aspect of the Party's efforts to erase memory and control history. The principle party slogan of Ingsoc is "Who controls the past controls the future: who controls the present controls the past". Doublethink requires the "continual alteration of the past", the erasure of memory as a form of reality control in which the individual must perform surveillance and discipline of the self.

== Critical response ==
Doublethink was described by Carl Freedman as a satiric and abstract concept. He commented that although Orwell illustrates how the concept operates, he does not explain why it can be mentally performed. The process serves the needs of the Party by fabricating information but requires the human brain to accept two different ideas at the same time and without a logical conclusion. It also requires the brain to perform the act of doublethink without even acknowledging it. He concluded that the concept needed a social or psychological basis, such as the concept of mauvaise foi by Jean-Paul Sartre, the idea of self-contradiction in the bourgeoisie in acknowledging the exploitation of workers.

Mike Martin argued that doublethink is Orwell's expression of self-deception, meaning the human mind's unwillingness to confront uncomfortable truths for reasons of shame, guilt or to reject responsibility. He noted the resemblance between Orwell's description and Sartre's expression of self-deception in Being and Nothingness, a book published six years before Nineteen Eighty-Four. Martin considered the purpose of the Party's influence over the population using doublethink is to prevent the rise of alternative ideologies while also controlling individuals in order to involve them in their own loss of freedom and rational thought.

== Impact and influence ==
Orwell's doublethink is credited with having inspired the commonly used term doublespeak, which itself does not appear in the book.

== See also ==
Other concepts derived from Nineteen Eighty Four:

- 2 + 2 = 5
- Groupthink
- List of Newspeak words
- Memory hole
- Thoughtcrime

Complementary pages

- Alternative facts
- Big lie
- Contradiction
- Dissociation (psychology)
- Double-talk
- Hypocrisy
- Paraconsistent logic
- Political hypocrisy
- Reality-based community
- You can't have your cake and eat it
