= Ministries in Nineteen Eighty-Four =

Fictional governmental organisations in the novel Nineteen Eighty-Four

The Ministry of Truth, the Ministry of Peace, the Ministry of Love, and the Ministry of Plenty are the four ministries of the government of Oceania in the 1949 dystopian novel Nineteen Eighty-Four, by George Orwell.

The Ministry of Peace concerns itself with war, the Ministry of Truth with lies, the Ministry of Love with torture and the Ministry of Plenty with starvation. These contradictions are not accidental, nor do they result from ordinary hypocrisy: they are deliberate exercises in doublethink.

— Part II, Chapter IX

The use of contradictory names in this manner may have been inspired from the British and American governments; during the Second World War, the British Ministry of Food oversaw rationing (the name "Ministry of Food Control" was used in World War I) and the Ministry of Information restricted and controlled information, rather than supplying it; while, in the U.S., the War Department was abolished and replaced with the "National Military Establishment" in 1947 and then became the Department of Defense in 1949, right around the time that Nineteen Eighty-Four was published.

== Ministry of Truth ==
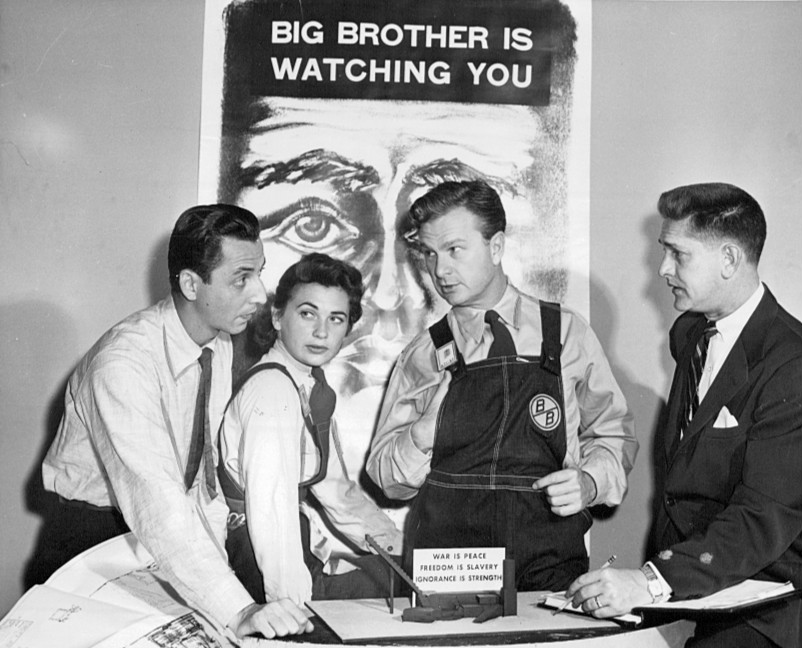
Norma Crane (second from left) and Eddie Albert (third from left) as Ministry of Truth employees Julia and Winston Smith, from the 1953 American television adaptation

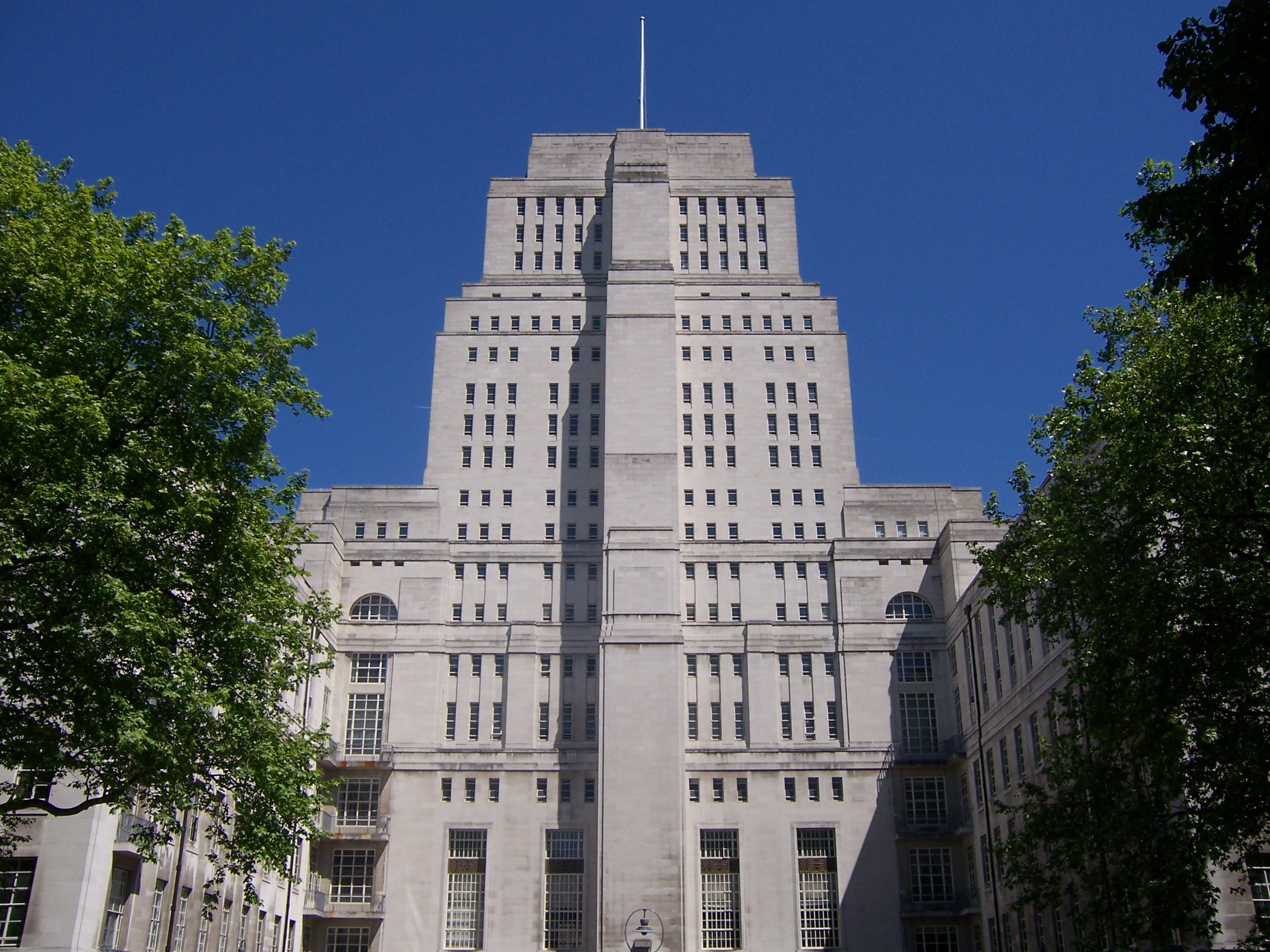
Senate House, London, where Orwell's wife worked at the Ministry of Information, was his model for the Ministry of Truth.

The Ministry of Truth (Newspeak: Minitrue) is the ministry of propaganda. As with the other ministries in the novel, the name Ministry of Truth is a deliberate misnomer because in reality, it serves the opposite: It is responsible for any necessary falsification of historical events. However, like the other ministries, the name is also apt because it decides what "truth" is in Oceania.

As well as administering "truth", the ministry spreads a new language amongst the populace called Newspeak, in which, for example, "truth" is understood to mean statements like 2 + 2 = 5 when the situation warrants. In keeping with the concept of doublethink, the ministry is thus aptly named in that it creates/manufactures "truth" in the Newspeak sense of the word. The book describes the doctoring of historical records to show a government-approved version of events.

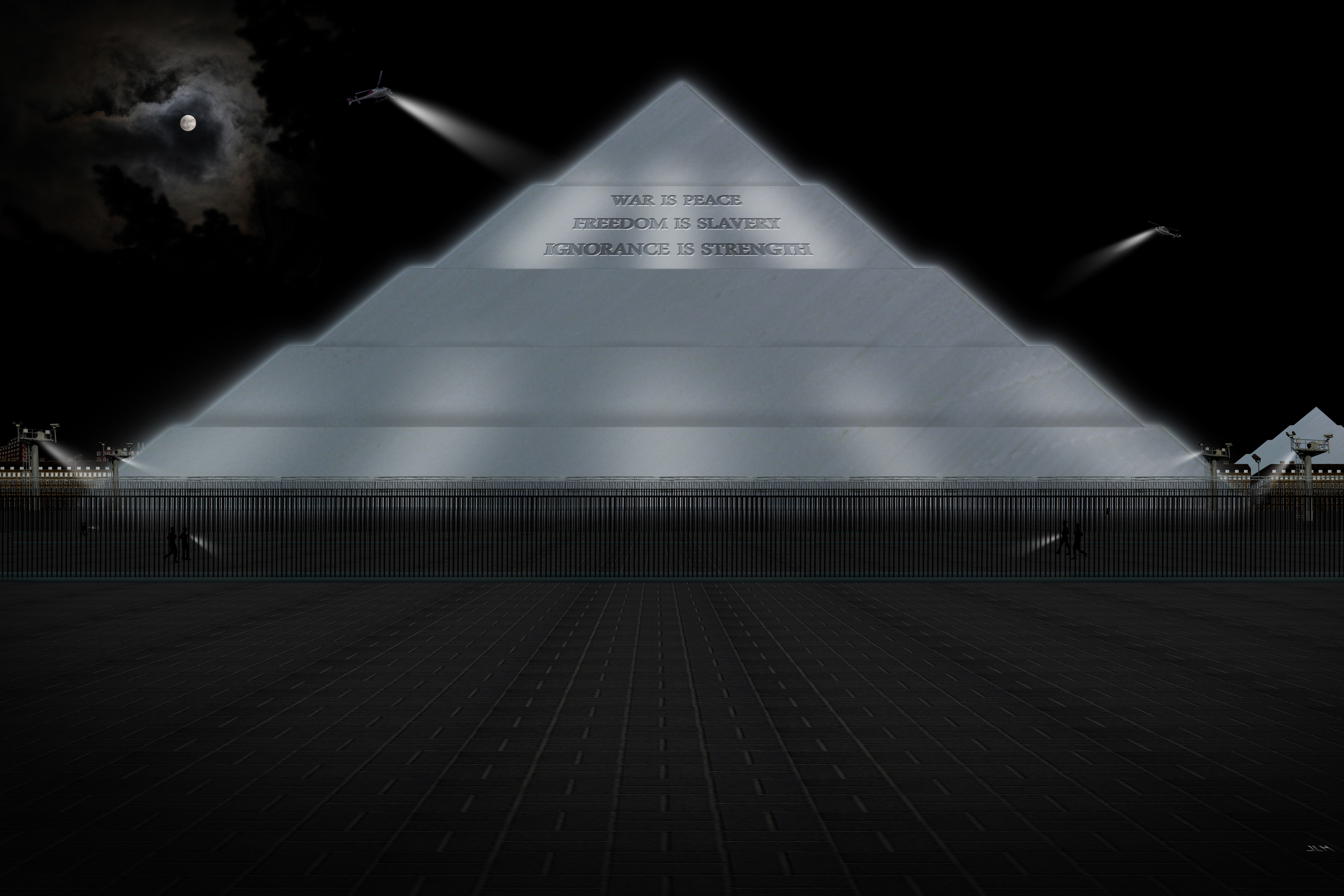
Artist's depiction of the Ministry of Truth building

=== Description ===
Winston Smith, the main character of the novel, works at the Ministry of Truth. It is an enormous pyramidal structure of glittering white concrete rising 300 m (980 ft) into the air, containing over 3000 rooms above ground. On the outside wall are the three slogans of the Party: "WAR IS PEACE", "FREEDOM IS SLAVERY", and "IGNORANCE IS STRENGTH". There is also a large part underground, probably containing huge incinerators where documents are destroyed after they are put down memory holes. For his description, Orwell was inspired by the Senate House at the University of London.

=== Role in information ===
The Ministry of Truth is involved with news media, entertainment, the fine arts, and educational books. Its purpose is to rewrite history to change the facts to fit Party doctrine for propaganda effect. For example, if Big Brother makes a prediction that turns out to be wrong, the employees of the Ministry of Truth correct the record to make it accurate. This is the "how" of the Ministry of Truth's existence. Within the novel, Orwell elaborates that the deeper reason for its existence, the "why", is to maintain the illusion that the Party is absolutely infallible, and should be trusted without question. It cannot ever seem to change its mind (if, for instance, they perform one of their constant changes regarding enemies during war) or make a mistake (firing an official or making a grossly misjudged supply prediction), for that would imply weakness, and to maintain power the Party must seem eternally right and strong.

=== Departments ===
The following are the sections or departments of the ministry mentioned in the text:

- Records Department (Newspeak: Recdep)
- Fiction Department (Newspeak: Ficdep)
- Tele-programmes Department (Newspeak: Teledep)
- Pornography section – for Prole consumption only (Newspeak: Pornosec)

== Ministry of Peace ==
The Ministry of Peace (Newspeak: Minipax) serves as the war ministry of Oceania's government, and is in charge of the armed forces, mostly the navy and army. The Ministry of Peace may be the most vital organ of Oceania, seeing as the nation is supposedly in an ongoing genocidal war with either Eurasia or Eastasia and requires the right amount of force not to win the war outright, but to keep it in an ongoing state of equilibrium.

As explained in Emmanuel Goldstein's fictional book, The Theory and Practice of Oligarchical Collectivism, the Ministry of Peace revolves around the principle of perpetual war. Perpetual war uses up all surplus resources, keeping most citizens in lives of constant hardship—and thus preventing them from learning enough to comprehend the true nature of their society. Perpetual warfare also "helps preserve the special mental atmosphere that a hierarchical society needs." Since that means the balance of the country rests in the war, the Ministry of Peace is in charge of fighting the war (mostly centred around Africa and India), but making sure to never tip the scales, in case the war should become one-sided. Oceanic telescreens usually broadcast news reports about how Oceania is continually winning every battle it fights, though these reports have little to no credibility.

As with all the other Nineteen Eighty-Four ministries, the Ministry of Peace is named the exact opposite of what it does, since the Ministry of Peace is in charge of maintaining a state of war. The meaning of peace has been equated with the meaning of war in the slogan of the party, "War is Peace". Like the names of other ministries, it also has a literal application: Perpetual war is what keeps the "peace" (the status quo) in Oceania and the balance of power in the world, and since the other major powers also use perpetual warfare as a means of maintaining the status quo, the two concepts are functionally identical.

== Ministry of Love ==
The Ministry of Love (Newspeak: Miniluv) serves as Oceania's interior ministry. It enforces loyalty to Big Brother through fear, buttressed through a massive apparatus of security and repression, as well as systematic brainwashing. The Ministry of Love building has no windows and is surrounded by barbed wire entanglements, steel doors, hidden machine-gun nests, and guards armed with "jointed truncheons". Referred to as "the place where there is no darkness", its interior lights are never turned off. It is arguably the most powerful ministry, controlling the will of the population. The Thought Police are the outward extension of Miniluv.

The Ministry of Love, like the other ministries, is misnamed, since it is responsible for the practice and infliction of misery, fear, suffering, and torture. In a sense, however, the name is apt, since its ultimate purpose is to instill love of Big Brother—the only form of love permitted in Oceania—in the minds of thoughtcriminals as part of the process of reverting them to orthodox thought, before executing them. This is typical of the language of Newspeak, in which words and names frequently contain both an idea and its opposite; the orthodox party member is nonetheless able to resolve these contradictions through the disciplined use of doublethink.

=== Room 101 ===
Room 101 (pronounced one-oh-one), introduced in the climax of the novel, is the basement torture chamber in the Ministry of Love, in which the Party attempts to subject prisoners to their own worst nightmare, fear or phobia, with the objective of breaking down their final resistance.

You asked me once, what was in Room 101. I told you that you knew the answer already. Everyone knows it. The thing that is in Room 101 is the worst thing in the world.

— O'Brien, Part III, Chapter V

Such is the purported omniscience of the state in the society of Nineteen Eighty-Four that even a citizen's nightmares are known to the Party. The nightmare, and therefore the threatened punishment, of the protagonist Winston Smith is to be attacked by rats. This is manifested in Room 101 by confronting Smith with a wire cage that contains two large rats. The front of the cage is shaped so that it can fit over a person's face. A trap-door is then opened, allowing the rats to devour the victim's face. This cage is fitted over Smith's face, but he saves himself by begging the authorities to subject his lover, Julia, to suffer this torture instead of him. The threatened torture, and what Winston is willing to sacrifice to escape it, breaks his last promise to himself and to Julia: never to betray her. Even though he had confessed to their actions, he still loved her until this point. The book suggests that Julia is likewise subjected to her own worst fear, although it is not revealed what that fear is, and when she and Winston meet in a park outside the Chestnut Tree Cafe in the book's final chapter, he notices a scar on her forehead. The intent of threatening Winston with the rats was to break his spirit by forcing him into betraying the only person he loved, thus eliciting his compliance.

Orwell named Room 101 after a conference room at Broadcasting House of the BBC where he used to sit through tedious meetings.

== Ministry of Plenty ==
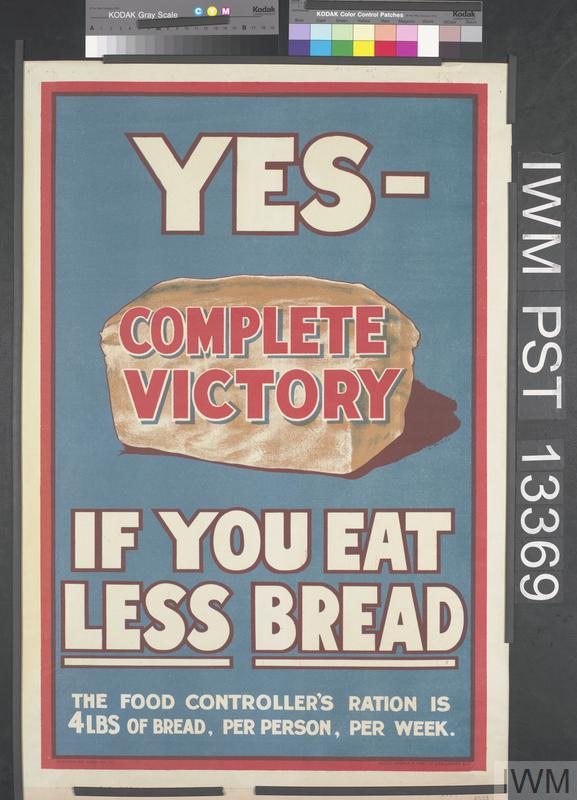
British First World War rationing poster

The Ministry of Plenty (Newspeak: Miniplenty) is in control of Oceania's command economy. It oversees rationing of food, supplies, and goods. As told in Goldstein's book, the economy of Oceania is very important, and it is necessary to have the public continually create useless and synthetic supplies or weapons for use in the war, while they have no access to the means of production. This is the central theme of Oceania's idea that a poor, ignorant populace is easier to rule over than a wealthy, well-informed one. Telescreens often make reports on how Big Brother has been able to increase economic production, even when production has actually gone down (see § Ministry of Truth).

The Ministry hands out statistics which are "nonsense". When Winston is adjusting some Ministry of Plenty's figures, he explains this:

But actually, he thought as he readjusted the Ministry of Plenty's figures, it was not even forgery. It was merely the substitution of one piece of nonsense for another. Most of the material that you were dealing with had no connection with anything in the real world, not even the kind of connection that is contained in a direct lie. Statistics were just as much a fantasy in their original version as in their rectified version. A great deal of the time you were expected to make them up out of your head.

Like the other ministries, the Ministry of Plenty seems to be entirely misnamed, since it is, in fact, responsible for maintaining a state of perpetual poverty, scarcity and financial shortages. However, the name is also apt, because, along with the Ministry of Truth, the Ministry of Plenty's other purpose is to convince the populace that they are living in a state of perpetual prosperity. Orwell made a similar reference to the Ministry of Plenty in his allegorical work Animal Farm when, in the midst of a blight upon the farm, Napoleon the pig orders the silo to be filled with sand, then to place a thin sprinkling of grain on top, which fools human visitors into being dazzled about Napoleon's boasting of the farm's superior economy.

A department of the Ministry of Plenty is charged with organizing state lotteries. These are very popular among the proles, who buy tickets and hope to win the big prizes—a completely vain hope as the big prizes are in fact not awarded at all, the Ministry of Truth participating in the scam and publishing every week the names of non-existent big winners.

In the Michael Radford film adaptation, the ministry is renamed the Ministry of Production, or MiniProd.

== Cultural impact ==
The novel's popularity has resulted in the term "Room 101" being used to represent a place where unpleasant things are done.

- According to Anna Funder's 2002 book Stasiland, Erich Mielke, the last Minister of State Security (Stasi) of East Germany, had the floors of the Stasi headquarters renumbered so that his second floor office would be number 101.
- In the BBC comedy radio and television series Room 101, celebrities are invited to discuss their pet hates and persuade the host to consign them to oblivion, as metaphorically represented by the idea of Room 101.

Writer Josh Wilbur proposed a "Ministry of Truth" to combat internet deepfakes and misinformation.

=== In fiction ===
In The Ricky Gervais Show, Ricky Gervais and Stephen Merchant play a game called "Room 102", based on the concept of "Room 101", in which Karl Pilkington has to decide what things he dislikes enough to put in Room 102. This would result, according to their game, in these things being erased from existence.

In the BBC radio series Nineteen Ninety-Four, a comedic parody of Nineteen Eighty-Four, protagonist Edward Wilson is employed as a civil servant at the Department of the Environment, the privatised governing body of the Environment (formerly Britain) created following "The Difficulties". Wilson is put in charge of the Environment, with his office situated in Room 1001 of the Department's headquarters, as an experiment to determine how much choice one person can take as part of a wider programme to rebuild the Environment's society along consumerist lines. Spending weeks isolated in Room 1001 and facing the disastrous consequences of decisions he made on his own initiative, Wilson becomes insane.

In Terry Gilliam's 1985 film, Brazil, the alternate dystopian world in which the film is set bears immense similarities to that of Nineteen Eighty-Four, including following an anxious bureaucrat who works at a governmental establishment called the Ministry of Information.

In the 2011 Doctor Who episode "The God Complex", the Doctor and his companions find themselves in a hotel full of their own personal Room 101s, each with their greatest fear in it. The Doctor's own room is number 11, which serves as a double entendre, alluding both to the real Room 101, and to the fact that the then-incumbent, Matt Smith, was the eleventh Doctor.

The game series Helldivers often satirically mentions the Ministry of Truth, alongside others such as the "Ministry of Expansion" and the "Ministry of Unity".
