= Thought Police =

Secret police of Oceania in the novel Nineteen Eighty-Four

In the 1949 dystopian novel Nineteen Eighty-Four by George Orwell, the Thought Police (Thinkpol in Newspeak) are the secret police of the superstate of Oceania, who discover and punish thoughtcrime (personal and political thoughts unapproved by Ingsoc's régime). Using criminal psychology and omnipresent surveillance (via informers, telescreens, cameras, and microphones) the Thinkpol monitor the citizens of Oceania and arrest all those who have committed thoughtcrime in challenge to the status quo authority of the Party and of the régime of Big Brother.

Orwell drew inspiration from his observation of the NKVD's methods of surveillance, control, and punishment of dissent in the Soviet Union and from his experiences in the Spanish Civil War.

== In Nineteen Eighty-Four ==
In the year 1984, the government of Oceania, dominated by the Inner Party, uses the Newspeak language – a heavily simplified version of English – to control the speech, actions, and thought of the population, by defining "unapproved thoughts" as thoughtcrime; for such actions, the Thinkpol arrest Winston Smith, the protagonist of the story, and Julia, his lover, as enemies of the state. In conversation with Winston, O'Brien, a member of the Inner Party and a covert Thinkpol officer, reveals that the Thinkpol conduct false flag operations, by pretending to be members of the Brotherhood, in order to lure out and arrest "thought criminals".

As an agent provocateur, O'Brien gives Winston a copy of the forbidden book, The Theory and Practice of Oligarchical Collectivism, by Emmanuel Goldstein the enemy of the state of Oceania; yet the factual reality of The Brotherhood in Oceania remains uncertain, because O'Brien refuses to tell Winston whether or not the Brotherhood truly exists. The book explains that “Nothing is efficient in Oceania except the Thought Police,” as the Thinkpol is the only apparatus that must function effectively for the Party to retain control. There is a telescreen in the quarters of every Inner-party and Outer-party citizen, by which the Thinkpol audio-visually police their behaviour for unorthodox opinions, and to spy visible indications of the mental stresses manifested by a person struggling with ownlife, such as words spoken whilst asleep. The Thinkpol also spy upon and eliminate intelligent people, such as the lexicographer Syme, who is rendered an unperson despite his fierce loyalty to the Party and to Big Brother.

To eliminate possible martyrs, men and women of whom popular memory might provoke anti–Party resistance, thought-criminals are taken to the Miniluv (Ministry of Love), where the Thinkpol break them with conversation, degradation (moral and physical), and torture in Room 101. In breaking prisoners, the Thinkpol coerce their sincere acceptance of the Ingsoc worldview and to love Big Brother without reservation. Afterward, the Thinkpol release the politically rehabilitated prisoners to the social mainstream of Oceania. If the released thought-criminals are found to have committed more thoughtcrimes, the Thinkpol re-arrest them for further interrogation and torture, and eventual execution that concludes with cremation into an unperson.

Moreover, every member of the Inner Party and of the Outer Party who ever knew, was acquainted with, or knew of any unperson must forget them, lest they commit the thoughtcrime of remembering an unperson. Such crimestop, ideological self-discipline, of not thinking independently, indicates the cultural success of the Newspeak language as a means of social control. Moreover, the Minitrue (Ministry of Truth) is tasked with destroying all records of unpersons. The Thinkpol usually does not interfere with the lives of the Proles, the working classes of Oceania, but do deploy undercover agents provocateur to operate amongst them, by planting rumours to entrap and identify and eliminate any Prole who shows intelligence and the capacity for independent thought, which might lead to rebellion against the cultural hegemony of the Party.

== In other usages ==
In the early twentieth century, before the publication of Nineteen Eighty-Four, the Empire of Japan (1868–1947), in 1911, established the Tokubetsu Kōtō Keisatsu ('Special Higher Police'), a political police force also known as Shisō Keisatsu, the Thought Police, who investigated and controlled native political groups whose ideologies were considered a threat to the public order of the countries colonised by Japan. In contemporary usage, the term Thought Police and variants thereof often refers to the actual or perceived enforcement of ideological orthodoxy in the political life of a society. In North Korea, the National Intelligence Agency (NIA) was established by the Kim dynasty in 1973 and was known by its nickname Saeng-gag-gyeongchal (Thought Police) where thoughts in the DPRK are controlled not just the Songbun caste system, but by the Workers' Party of Korea (WPK).

== See also ==
- List of fictional secret police and intelligence organizations
- Brainwashing
