= Cogitationis poenam nemo patitur =

Explanation of Latin legal phrase

The Latin expression cogitationis poenam nemo patitur is used in the field of criminal law to express that only a conduct, and not a simple thought, can constitute a crime. This phrase originally appeared in the "Institutions" of the jurist Ulpian (170-228). Later, it appeared in the Digest, a compilation of Roman legal texts carried out by order of the Byzantine emperor Justinian in the sixth century.

Its translation would be "no one can be punished for their thoughts". According to this, thinking about stealing something is not punishable, while committing a robbery is. This principle of Roman law assumes that no thought or desire of a human being can be criminal, until this manifestation of thought or desire is externalized, causing unjust conduct that causes damage to a protected legal asset.

== In works of fiction ==
The dystopian novel Nineteen Eighty-Four (1949) features a totalitarian superpower in which this legal principle is rejected, and there is even a "Thought Police" that fights "thoughtcrime":

We are not interested in those stupid crimes that you have committed. The Party is not interested in the overt act: the thought is all we care about.
