= John Boswall =

British actor (1920–2011)

- Born: John Stuart; 2 May 1920; Oxfordshire, England
- Died: 6 June 2011 (aged 91); South Woodchester, Gloucestershire, England
- Occupation: Actor
- Years active: 1970–2009

John Boswall (2 May 1920 – 6 June 2011) was a British actor known for playing Emmanuel Goldstein in 1984 and Wyvern in Pirates of the Caribbean: Dead Man's Chest.

== Early life and education ==
Boswall was born John Stuart on 2 May 1920 in Oxfordshire, England. Prior to his career as an actor, he attended the University of Oxford and served in Burma during World War II.

== Career ==
Boswall's television appearances included Paul Temple (1971), Wessex Tales (1973), Lady Killer (1973), Edward the Seventh (1975), The Onedin Line (1976), Love in a Cold Climate (1980), The Hound of the Baskervilles (1982), Sapphire & Steel (1982), No Place Like Home (1986), EastEnders (1990, 2002), Selling Hitler (1991), Agatha Christie's Poirot (1991), Drop the Dead Donkey (1993), Lovejoy (1993), Poldark (1996), Doctors (2000), Rome (2005) and Terry Pratchett's Hogfather (2006).

Stage appearances included Edward Bond's The Fool at the Royal Court Theatre (1975), Sweeney Todd at the Little Theatre, Bristol (1978–79); Oh, What A Lovely War!, A Midsummer Night's Dream (1979–80), and Kiss Me, Kate (1980–81) at the Bristol Old Vic; Henry IV, Part I (1984–85) at the Theatre Royal, Bath; Doctor Faustus (1974), Cymbeline (1974) and Camille (1985–86) with the Royal Shakespeare Company; and Moliere's Bourgeois gentilhomme (1992) at the Royal National Theatre.

His films included Nineteen Eighty-Four as Emmanuel Goldstein (1984), Three Men and a Little Lady (1990), The Wind in the Willows (1996), The Messenger: The Story of Joan of Arc (1999), Hotel Splendide (2000), Ladies in Lavender (2004), Pirates of the Caribbean: Dead Man's Chest (2006) and Morris: A Life with Bells On (2009).

== Death ==
Boswall died of pancreatic cancer on 6 June 2011 at the age of 91, in South Woodchester, Gloucestershire, England. He was never married.

== Filmography ==
Year	Title	Role	Notes
1976	The Life Story of Baal	Woodcutter	
1984	Nineteen Eighty-Four	Emmanuel Goldstein	
1990	Three Men and a Little Lady	Barrow	
1996	The Wind in the Willows	The Elderly Gentleman	
1998	Stiff Upper Lips	Don 2	
1999	The Messenger: The Story of Joan of Arc	Old Priest	
2003	The Statement	Father Léo	
2004	Ladies in Lavender	Very Old Man 2	
2006	Pirates of the Caribbean: Dead Man's Chest	Wyvern	
2006	Terry Pratchett's Hogfather	Chair of Indefinite Studies	TV miniseries
2009	Morris: A Life with Bells On	Mr. Staveley	(final film role)
