= Yvonne Mitchell =

English actress (1915–1979)

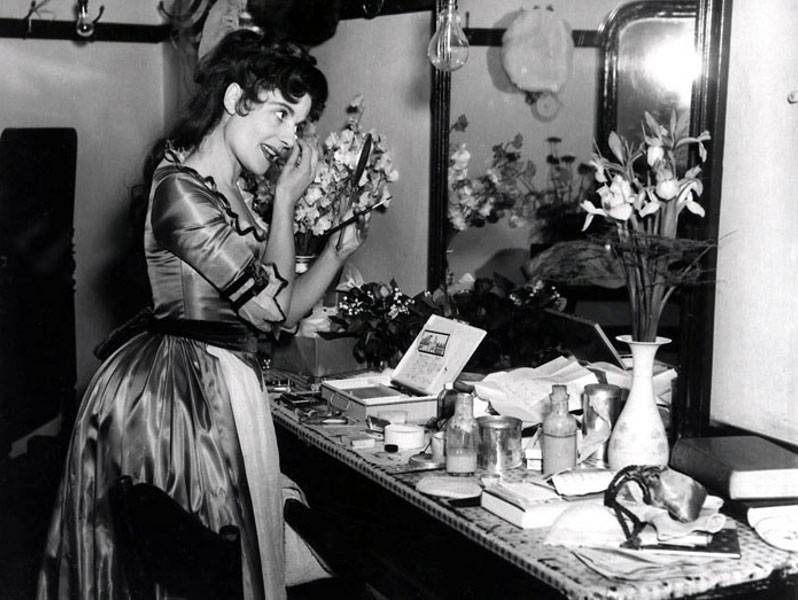
- Born: Yvonne Frances Joseph; 7 July 1915; London, England
- Died: 24 March 1979 (aged 63); Westminster, London, England
- Education: London Theatre Studio
- Years active: 1939–1977
- Spouse: Derek Monsey (m. 1952; died 1979)
- Children: 1

Yvonne Mitchell (born Yvonne Frances Joseph; 7 July 1915 – 24 March 1979) was an English actress and author. After beginning her acting career in theatre, Mitchell progressed to films in the late 1940s. Her roles include Julia in the 1954 BBC adaptation of George Orwell's novel Nineteen Eighty-Four. She retired from acting in 1977.

== Early life ==
Mitchell was born Yvonne Frances Joseph, but in 1946 changed her name by deed poll to Yvonne Mitchell (without the Frances). Her parents were Madge (Mitchell) and Bertie Joseph. Her cousin was Conservative MP Keith Joseph. She was Jewish and was educated in Sussex at Battle Abbey School and St Paul's Girls' School in London.

== Acting ==
Mitchell trained for an acting career at the London Theatre Studio, making her professional debut in 1939. Already an experienced stage actress, she made her speaking film debut in The Queen of Spades (1949), although she played an uncredited minor role in Love on the Dole eight years earlier.

She had several prominent film roles over the next three decades, winning a British Film Award for The Divided Heart (1954) and the Silver Bear for Best Actress at the 7th Berlin International Film Festival for Woman in a Dressing Gown (1957). She appeared as Mildred in the controversial film Sapphire (1959).

Mitchell was voted 'Television Actress of the Year' for 1953 by the Daily Mail newspaper, mainly for her role as Cathy in the Nigel Kneale/Rudolph Cartier adaptation of Emily Brontë's novel Wuthering Heights. The next year, she appeared in another Kneale/Cartier literary adaptation in the role of Julia, with Peter Cushing as Winston Smith, in their adaptation of Nineteen Eighty-Four.

She starred as Lea in the 1973 BBC TV production of Colette's Cheri. She continued to appear in television guest roles until the late 1970s, in series such as Out of the Unknown (in 1966); her final screen role was in the BBC science-fiction series 1990 (1977).

== Writing ==
Outside acting, Mitchell was also an established author, writing several books for children and adults as well as winning awards for playwriting. Her plays include The Same Sky. She wrote an acclaimed biography of the French writer Colette, and her own autobiography was published in 1957.

== Personal life ==
Mitchell was married to the journalist, film and theatre critic and novelist Derek Monsey (1921–1979) and they lived in a village in the south of France.

Mitchell died of cancer, aged 63, in 1979. Monsey died the same year, roughly one month earlier.

== Filmography ==
Year	Film	Role	Director	Notes
1941	Love on the Dole	Factory Worker at Gate	John Baxter	uncredited
1949	The Queen of Spades	Lizaveta Ivanova	Thorold Dickinson	
1949	Children of Chance	Australia	Luigi Zampa	
1953	Turn the Key Softly	Monica Marsden	Jack Lee	
1954	The Divided Heart	Sonja	Charles Crichton	
1955	Escapade	Mrs. Stella Hampden	Philip Leacock	
1956	Yield to the Night	MacFarlane	J. Lee Thompson	
1957	Woman in a Dressing Gown	Amy	J. Lee Thompson	
1958	Passionate Summer	Mrs. Pawley	Rudolph Cartier	
1959	Tiger Bay	Anya	J. Lee Thompson	
1959	Sapphire	Mildred	Basil Dearden	
1960	Conspiracy of Hearts	Sister Gerta	Ralph Thomas	
1960	The Trials of Oscar Wilde	Constance Wilde	Ken Hughes	
1961	Johnny Nobody	Miss Floyd	Nigel Patrick	
1962	The Main Attraction	Elenora Moreno	Daniel Petrie	
1965	Genghis Khan	Katke	Henry Levin	
1971	The Corpse	Edith Eastwood	Viktors Ritelis	
1972	The Great Waltz	Anna Strauss	Andrew L. Stone	
1972	Demons of the Mind	Hilda	Peter Sykes	
1976	The Incredible Sarah	Mam'selle	Richard Fleischer	
1977	Nido de Viudas	Elvira	Tony Navarro	
1978	1990 (TV Series)	Kate Smith	Wilfred Greatorex	
