= The Same Sky (play) =

1951 play by Yvonne Mitchell

The Same Sky is a play by Yvonne Mitchell which won an Arts Council playwriting competition in 1951 and was produced in the same year at Nottingham Playhouse under the title Here Choose I. In 1952 it was re-titled The Same Sky for a new production at the Lyric Theatre, Hammersmith, starring Thora Hird which subsequently transferred to the Duke of York's Theatre on the West End, where it was re-lit by Peter Brook. It was later adapted for both radio and television.

== Plot summary ==
It is set in London in 1940 during The Blitz. At the center is the romance between a young couple, Esther Brodsky, who is Jewish, and Jeff Smith, who is not. Initially the families are opposed to the relationship, but only after Jeff is killed in the war do they become reconciled.
