= Roy Oxley =

British production designer

Roy Oxley (9 March 1905 – 1980) was a production designer at BBC Television who became famous after the BBC chose him to model for a photograph to be shown during their adaptation of George Orwell's novel Nineteen Eighty-Four.

Oxley began working in set design in 1948, as an art decorator in the film London Belongs to Me. He also supervised the art decoration of the 1949 film, Passport to Pimlico.

Oxley had been working for some years as set decorator for BBC when he was chosen, as an in-house joke, to model for the character of "Big Brother" in Nineteen Eighty-Four. "Big Brother" was not actually a participating character in the programme; his face was only shown on various posters and billboards seen during the adaptation.

Oxley worked at several other productions as a production designer with the BBC, including seven episodes of the Douglas Wilmer version of Sherlock Holmes, various episodes of Z-Cars and an adaptation for television of Dylan Thomas's Under Milk Wood. In 1969, he won a BAFTA Award for Production Design for his work of the BBC play The Portrait of a Lady.

== Personal life ==
He was married to Gladys Jean Jones; they had two children.
