= Wuthering Heights (1953 TV play) =

- Radio Times cover with Yvonne Mitchell & Richard Todd
- Genre: Period drama
- Based on: Wuthering Heights by Emily Brontë
- Written by: Nigel Kneale (adaptation)
- Directed by: Rudolph Cartier
- Starring: Richard Todd; Yvonne Mitchell
- Theme music composer: Alfred Dunning
- Composer: Richard Addinsell
- Country of origin: United Kingdom
- Original language: English

Production
- Producer: Rudolph Cartier
- Running time: 100 minutes

Original release
- Network: BBC tv
- Release: 6 December 1953

Wuthering Heights is a 1953 British TV production of Emily Brontë's classic 1847 novel. It was made because Richard Todd, then at the height of his film popularity, expressed interest in playing Heathcliff and the BBC arranged for an adaptation to be made. Todd wrote in his memoirs that he was approached to make it by Michael Barry and Rudolph Cartier. He was making a French film The Bed at the time. Todd said the production was "to break new ground: far from being static with few camera angles, we had over 70 different set-ups to contend with and several cameras to shoot them."

The production was very popular, although no recordings are thought to have survived. Kneale's script was remade on television in Australia in 1959.

== Plot summary ==
Heathcliff, an orphan taken in by the Earnshaw family, grows up alongside Catherine Earnshaw and forms a deep bond with her. Mistreated by Catherine's brother Hindley after their father's death, Heathcliff leaves Wuthering Heights when Catherine chooses to marry the wealthier Edgar Linton instead. He returns some years later, now a man of means, and settles at Wuthering Heights as its master. To spite Catherine, he marries Edgar's sister Isabella.

== Cast ==
- Richard Todd as Heathcliff
- Yvonne Mitchell as Cathy
- William Devlin as Lockwood
- Sydney Bromley as Joseph
- Rene Ray as Isabella (as René Ray)
- Jane Henderson as Ellen
- Robert Brown as Hindley Earnshaw
- Peter Bryant as Edgar Linton
- John Kidd as Dr. Kenneth
