= O'Brien (Nineteen Eighty-Four) =

Fictional character in George Orwell's novel Nineteen Eighty-Four

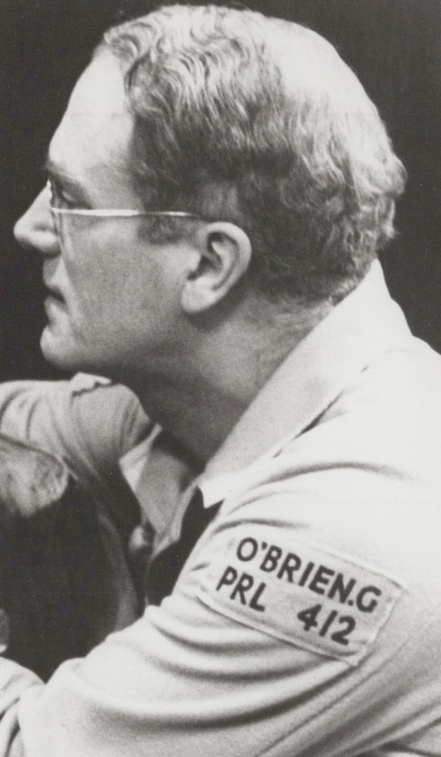
- Joseph O'Conor as O'Brien in a 1965 Theatre 625 production of Nineteen Eighty-Four
- First appearance: Nineteen Eighty-Four (1949)
- Created by: George Orwell
- Based on: Gletkin (Darkness at Noon); Brendan Bracken
- Portrayed by: Lorne Greene; Joseph O'Conor; Richard Burton; Alan Hewitt; Tim Dutton; Richard Margison; Michael Redgrave; Hilton McRae
- Voiced by: Tim Pigott-Smith (BBC Radio version)

In-universe information
- Gender: Male
- Occupation: Inner Party member, agent of the Thought Police
- Affiliation: The Party
- Nationality: Oceanian

O'Brien is a fictional character and the main antagonist in George Orwell's 1949 novel Nineteen Eighty-Four. The protagonist Winston Smith, living in a dystopian society governed by the Party, feels strangely drawn to Inner Party member O'Brien. Orwell never reveals O'Brien's first name.

== Overview ==
O'Brien is a member of the elite Inner Party and, like Winston Smith, works in the Ministry of Truth. There, he holds an administrative position that is so distant that Winston has only a vague idea of its nature.

Winston suspects that O'Brien secretly opposes the Party. Eventually O'Brien approaches Winston with some leading remarks which seem to confirm Winston's suspicions. O'Brien invites Winston (who then invites Julia) to his flat where, as a member of the Inner Party he lives in comparative luxury. Winston finds the courage to approach him candidly, declaring himself an enemy of the totalitarian state. At first, Winston's intuition seems to be correct: O'Brien presents himself as a member of the "Brotherhood" seeking to overthrow the Party and Ingsoc. Like Winston and Julia, O'Brien is not unfamiliar with smoking and drinking. However, as an Inner Party member, he has access to real food and far better quality cigarettes and other goods than they do. Whilst visiting O'Brien at his home, which is far more luxurious than Winston's home, Winston samples wine for the first time. O’Brien then turns off his Telescreen, which he says that only members of the Inner Party have the privilege to do, and extracts a series of pledges from the couple: that they are prepared to do anything to serve the Brotherhood, except (at Julia's protest) to separate from each other.

In truth, O'Brien is an undercover agent of the Thought Police, and is completely loyal to the Party and to Ingsoc. He is part of an elite false flag resistance movement whose main objective is to find thought-criminals (anyone who has ideas deemed to be unacceptable by the Party), lure them in by pretending to be on their side, then arrest and help them to become "sane", i.e. genuinely (not merely superficially) ideologically conforming.

O'Brien is next seen after Winston is arrested by the Thought Police. He reveals himself as he enters the cell by responding to Winston's exclamation, "They've got you too!", by commenting, almost jokingly, "They got me a long time ago." Winston instantly realizes the implication. O'Brien then reminds Winston that "You knew this Winston. Don't deceive yourself. You did know it - You have always known it", meaning that Winston has always had a suspicion of what O'Brien really is but, out of loneliness and curiosity and the need to speak to someone who could respond intelligently and knowingly to his questions, he nevertheless continued the dangerous charade. Winston sadly acknowledges to himself the truth of O'Brien's words.

O'Brien is estimated privately by Winston as being around 50 years old but looking terribly worn and much older. O'Brien, who can often read Winston's thoughts, correctly divines what Winston is thinking. He asks if Winston thinks the nature of O'Brien's handiwork on innumerable other thought-criminals over untold years is what has caused him to age prematurely and look so worn-out. Winston says yes because that is what hatred does. O'Brien denies that hate is more exhausting than love.

Being around 50 years old in 1984 would mean O'Brien was a young man at the time of the Revolution which brought the Party to power. Unlike Winston, he can remember the world as it was before – a world he rejected and helped to destroy which explains how he attained his Party position and influence. He never shares reminiscences of that world (which he may well have sublimated as inconsistent with Party doctrine) with Winston except for demonstrating, at Winston's query, that he knows the full text of "Oranges and Lemons".

Over a span of time that Winston is unable to measure, which could be months or years, O'Brien tortures Winston in many horrific ways including corporal punishment, starvation, electric shock, etc, to cure him of his "insanity", in particular his "false" notion that there exists a past and an external, self-evident reality independent of the Party. O'Brien explains that reality only exists within the human mind. Since the Party controls everyone's mind, it therefore controls reality.

He is entirely honest about the brutal cynicism of the Party; the Party does not seek power to improve people's lives but rather to permanently hold power and revel in it: "Always, Winston, at every moment, there will be the thrill of victory, the sensation of trampling on an enemy who is helpless. If you want a picture of the future, imagine a boot stamping on a human face — forever."

Even in the torture scenes, there is a strange intimacy that persists between Winston and O'Brien. O'Brien even states that Winston's mind appeals to him, and that it resembles his own mind, except that Winston happens to be "insane". Eventually, in Room 101, Winston betrays Julia which ends his rebellion against the Party.

== Inspirations ==
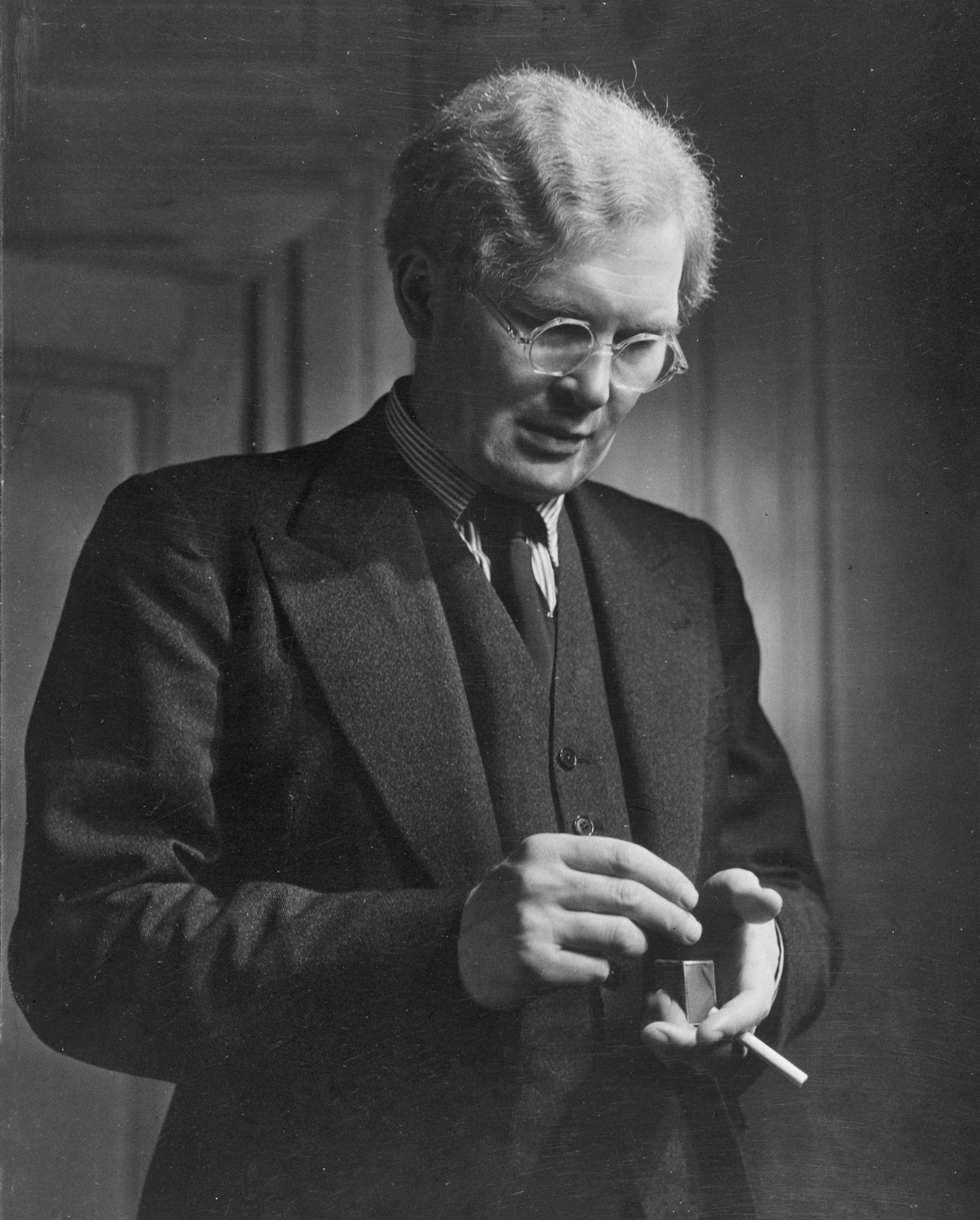
Brendan Bracken is a partial inspiration for O'Brien

O'Brien was partly inspired by the character of Gletkin from Arthur Koestler's novel Darkness at Noon. The two characters share many common traits, including their ruthlessness and fanaticism to the government: O'Brien however is more sadistic than the cold, detached Gletkin, and prefers to use torture himself, whereas Gletkin prefers to torment his prisoners psychologically. The torture scenes (undertaken by O'Brien) were influenced in part by the stories leaked out of the USSR of the punishments inflicted on political prisoners in mental hospitals and the Gulag. The choice of an Irish surname is regarded as a reference to Brendan Bracken, under whom Orwell worked during the war creating propaganda, and whom Orwell detested. In what has been described as "one of the strangest coincidences in literature", it was revealed in 2003 that O'Brien was the codename of NKVD agent Hugh O'Donnell, who received reports on the author from his subordinate David Crook when Crook spied on Orwell during the Spanish Civil War.

== Portrayals ==
O'Brien portrayed by Richard Burton in the 1984 film 1984

Canadian actor Lorne Greene played O'Brien in a 1953 adaptation on the CBS anthology series Studio One (S06E01) called "1984". In the adaptation broadcast on 26 April 1953 on The United States Steel Hour radio program, Alan Hewitt played O'Brien. In the BBC Television adaptation of Nineteen Eighty-Four (1954), the character was played by André Morell. Joseph O'Conor portrayed O'Brien in a 1965 adaptation on the series Theatre 625. In the 2013 BBC Radio 3 adaptation, O'Brien was played by Tim Pigott-Smith.

In the 1956 film, O'Brien was renamed O'Connor, possibly to avoid confusion with Edmond O'Brien, who portrayed Winston. O'Connor was played by Michael Redgrave. In the 1984 film version, O'Brien was portrayed by Richard Burton (his final role).

The character of Corbin O'Brian in the film Snowden (2016) is thought to have been inspired by Orwell's O'Brien.

In the highly successful Almeida Theatre and West End production of 1984 directed by Robert Icke, O'Brien was played by Tim Dutton.
