= Enemy of the state =

Person accused of certain crimes against the state

An enemy of the state is a person suspected of political crimes against the state, such as treason.

== Examples ==
=== Political ===
- In ancient Rome, some parties could be named an enemy of the state through specific public actions resulting in a formally recognized state of war. The Latin term proscription was used for official condemnation of enemies of the state.
- The term "enemy of the people" in the Soviet Union during the period of Stalinism.
- Communists were considered as enemies of the state in Indonesia since 1965. Displaying communist symbols or attempting to propagate the ideology is considered an act of high treason and terrorism punishable by up to 20 years of imprisonment.
- Jews, Romani people, Jehovah's Witnesses, homosexuals, disabled, communists, social democrats and trade unionists were considered "enemies of the state" in Nazi Germany.
- Leaker of classified U.S. military documents and diplomatic cables Chelsea Manning was charged with "aiding the enemy" (identified as al-Qaeda).
- Edward Snowden, the American computer specialist who leaked details of top-secret United States and British government mass surveillance programs to the press, has been discussed by opinion writers as being persecuted as an enemy of the state.
- Human rights defenders working on behalf of communities affected by large-scale development projects are increasingly branded as enemies of the state.
- Clive Palmer, an Australian mining magnate, was labelled as such by Mark McGowan, the Premier of Western Australia, when Palmer sued the Western Australian government for not allowing him free entry into the state during the COVID-19 pandemic lockdowns.

=== Biography ===
- Justin Raimondo's biography of Murray Rothbard, An Enemy of the State: The Life of Murray N. Rothbard.
- Bill Lueders' biography of Erwin Knoll, An Enemy of the State: The Life of Erwin Knoll.

=== Fictional ===
- The fictional character Peter LaNague in the novel An Enemy of the State (The LaNague Federation, Book 1) by F. Paul Wilson.
- The fictional character Emmanuel Goldstein in the novel Nineteen Eighty-Four by George Orwell.
- In Resident Evil: Damnation, special agent Leon S. Kennedy is accused of being an enemy of the state by President of the Eastern Slav Republic Svetlana Belikova who orders her guards to kill him right after she briefly spars in one-on-one combat with him.
- The six main characters in Final Fantasy XIII are branded as enemies of the state following the destruction of Cocoon; the main events of the game revolve around them trying to survive and hopefully clear their names.
- Tali'Zorah is accused of treason during her personal quest in Mass Effect 2.
- In the NCIS: New Orleans episode "Breaking Brig," the team hunt down a suspect known as "Matt S. O'Feeney", which was an anagram for eneMy OF State. The suspect was a dangerous man wanted by NCIS and Interpol for illegal arms dealing and other criminal activities.
- The protagonists of Avatar: The Last Airbender are declared enemies of the state by Long Feng, Grand Secretariat of the Earth Kingdom's capital city, in the episode "Lake Laogai."

== See also ==
- Enemy of the people
- Public enemy
