= Emmanuel Goldstein =

Character in George Orwell's novel Nineteen Eighty-Four

- Nineteen Eighty-Four character
- Emmanuel Goldstein portrayed by John Boswall in the 1984 film Nineteen Eighty-Four
- First appearance: Nineteen Eighty-Four (1949)
- Created by: George Orwell
- Based on: Leo Trotsky
- Portrayed by: Arnold Diamond (1954 BBC); John Boswall (1984 film)

In-universe information
- Occupation: Founder and leader of The Brotherhood
- Affiliation: The Brotherhood
- Nationality: Oceanic

Emmanuel Goldstein is a fictional character in George Orwell's 1949 dystopian novel Nineteen Eighty-Four. A principal enemy of the state of Oceania, the political propaganda of The Party portrays Goldstein as the leader of The Brotherhood, a secret, counter-revolutionary organization that violently opposes the leadership of Big Brother and the regime of the Ingsoc (English Socialism) Party.

He is also the author of The Theory and Practice of Oligarchical Collectivism (The Book), a counter-history of the revolution that installed The Party as the government of Oceania. It slanders Big Brother as a traitor of the revolution. Throughout the story, Emmanuel Goldstein appears only in Minitrue (Ministry of Truth) propaganda films on a telescreen, while O'Brien claims that The Party wrote The Book.

== Characterisation ==
Emmanuel Goldstein was a member of the Inner Party and brother-in-arms of Big Brother during the revolution that installed The Party as the government of Oceania. In their turn to totalitarianism, by way of English Socialism (Ingsoc), Goldstein broke with Big Brother and The Party, and then founded The Brotherhood to oppose their government of Oceania. Party propaganda teaches that Goldstein is an enemy of the state and that The Brotherhood is a leaderless resistance of cells of secret agents waging counter-revolution against Big Brother and The Party with the ideology of The Theory and Practice of Oligarchical Collectivism, The Book written by Goldstein.

In the course of everyday life in Oceania, Goldstein is always the subject of the Two Minutes Hate, a daily programme of propaganda that begins at 11:00 hours shown on a telescreen; it shows an over-sized image of Emmanuel Goldstein for the assembled citizens of Oceania to subject to loud insults and contempt. To prolong and deepen the anger of the spectators, the telescreen then shows images of Goldstein walking among the parading soldiers of the current enemy of Oceania—either Eurasia or Eastasia. The Two Minutes Hate programme shows Goldstein as both an ideological enemy of the Ingsoc régime of The Party and a traitor aiding the national enemy of Oceania.

The Party's scapegoating of Goldstein justifies the voiding of civil rights, the implementation of universal surveillance, and perpetual scarcity. Save for The Party's cultivation of a vague, but fervent, patriotism for Oceania, the Proles are excluded from the politics of Oceania, and only members of the Inner Party concern themselves with the existence or the non-existence of Emmanuel Goldstein and The Brotherhood; thus, when the protagonist Winston Smith asks O'Brien, a member of the Inner Party, if The Brotherhood exists, O'Brien replies:

That, Winston, you will never know. If we choose to set you free when we have finished with you, and if you live to be ninety years old, still you will never learn whether the answer to that question is Yes or No. As long as you live it will be an unsolved riddle in your mind.

O'Brien tells Winston that members of the Inner Party, including himself, wrote The Book, yet O'Brien's reply does not answer Winston's questions about the existence of Goldstein and The Brotherhood. The only claims of the existence (or non-existence) of the Brotherhood come directly from the Party itself. As such, its existence (or non-existence) may simply be part of the mystique of Big Brother and the party apparatus.

== Trotsky as Goldstein ==
=== Enemies of the state ===
In the 1950s, soon after publication of the novel Nineteen Eighty-Four, political commentators and literary critics noted the likeness between the fictional character Emmanuel Goldstein and the Russian revolutionary Leon Trotsky, who had been a political partner of Vladimir Lenin in realising the Russian Revolution of 1917. After the death of Lenin in 1924, despite being an Old Bolshevik, Trotsky lost the intramural party politics of succession to Joseph Stalin, who then assassinated the character of Trotsky to justify his expulsion, first from office, then from the Russian Communist Party in 1925, and then from the USSR in 1929—public condemnation as an enemy of the people.

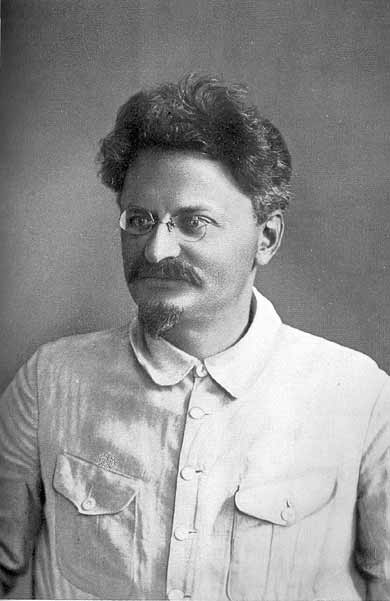
Literary critics have written of Leon Trotsky as the inspiration for the character Emmanuel Goldstein.

=== Exiled prophet ===
In foreign exile from the Communist politics of Soviet Russia, Trotsky wrote The Revolution Betrayed: What is the Soviet Union and Where is it Going? (1937), wherein he denounced Stalin as an ideologically illegitimate leader of the Russian Communist Party and of the Soviet state whose policies and actions betrayed the principles of the Russian Revolution (1917). Trotsky also argued in the same book for the restoration of the right of criticism in areas such as economic matters, the revitalization of trade unions and free elections of multiple Soviet parties. Trotsky further contended that the excessive totalitarianism under Stalin had undermined the potential development of the Soviet Union.

In the USSR, Stalin consolidated his absolute power over party and government with the Great Purges (1936–1938) by imprisoning and killing his personal and political enemies — including every Old Bolshevik with a legitimate claim to be a candidate for leader of the Communist Party and for leader of the Soviet state.

=== Enemy action ===
Throughout the 1930s, Stalinist propaganda called for the death of Trotsky, who was depicted as the enemy of the state who instigated every problem in the Soviet Union and in the Socialist world. Stalin succeeded against his nemesis when the NKVD secret agent Ramón Mercader assassinated Trotsky in Mexico City, in 1940. Concerning the ideological differences between the varieties of Marxist philosophy that are Stalinism and Trotskyism, Orwell said:

The fact that Trotskyists are everywhere a persecuted minority, and that the accusation usually made against them, i.e. of collaborating with the Fascists, is obviously false, creates an impression that Trotskyism is intellectually and morally superior to Communism; but it is doubtful whether there is much difference.

However, literary critic Jeffrey Meyers, who reviewed the political allegories in Orwell's work, stated that:

Orwell ignores the fact that Trotsky passionately opposed Stalin's dictatorship from 1924 to 1940, which featured Siberian prison camps, the deliberately created Ukraine famine and the massive slaughter during the Moscow Purge Trials of 1937.

Meyers also added that Orwell drew on the views of a right-wing combatant to reinforce his arguments. In contrast, Meyers cited Isaac Deutscher's biographical account of Trotsky which presented him to be a much more civilised figure than Stalin and suggested that he would not have purged the Red Army generals or millions of Soviet citizens.

=== The Book ===
Regarding the likeness between fictional and true-life enemies of the state, writer Isaac Deutscher said in 1954, that Emmanuel Goldstein's book, The Theory and Practice of Oligarchical Collectivism—known as The Book in the story of Nineteen Eighty-Four—was Orwell's paraphrasing of Trotsky's The Revolution Betrayed.

In 1956, literary critic Irving Howe praised the writing craft of the novelist Orwell in his replication of Trotsky's style of writing for The Book by Goldstein; thus Winston Smith's readings in The Book are the best-written passages of novelistic story-telling in Nineteen Eighty-Four. The critic Adrian Wanner said that The Book is a political parody of the Marxist philosophy and analyses that Trotsky presents in The Revolution Betrayed, and noted that Orwell was politically ambivalent about Trotsky being a different type of Communist from Stalin.

In correspondence with American writer Sidney Sheldon, Orwell stated that the Stalinist world portrayed in Nineteen Eighty-Four:

was based chiefly on Communism, because that is the dominant form of totalitarianism, but I was trying chiefly to imagine what Communism would be like if it were firmly rooted in the English speaking countries, and was no longer a mere extension of the Russian Foreign Office.

== Contemporary comparisons ==
=== Richard M. Nixon ===
In the article "The Orwell Hypothesis: Nixon's Quantum Jump?" (1971), the opportunistic geopolitics of U.S. President Richard M. Nixon's official visit (21–28 February 1972) to the People's Republic of China—then a Communist enemy of the U.S. during the tripolar stage (1956–1991) of the Cold War—were compared to the historical and political analyses of Emmanuel Goldstein about the continually shifting military alliances among the three super-states, Eastasia, Oceania, and Eurasia, described in the novel Nineteen Eighty-Four (1949).

In the critical essay, "Compassion for Nixon Hard to Summon" (1974), by Nick Thimmesch, and in the defensive essay, "Do We Really Need Vengeance from Nixon?" (1976), by Tom Tiede, the authors discuss the mass psychology of the vilification by certain segments of American society of former president Nixon as a consequence of the Watergate scandal (1972–1974), and that such political and personal vilification was an equivalent form of the Two Minutes Hate programs, which focused the collective anger of the body politic against ex-president Nixon as an enemy of the American people, including dartboards with Nixon's face on them. Tiede ends his commentary thus, "One of the things George Orwell was perfectly clear about in his prophesies concerning 1984 was that the people who are hated can never be as bad as the people who hate."

=== Osama bin Laden ===
About the aftermath of the 11 September 2001 attacks against the U.S., in the essay "Osama and Goldstein" (2001), Prof. William L. Anderson said that the ideological and political utility of publicly showing parallels between Emmanuel Goldstein and Osama bin Laden facilitated and justified the U.S. government's unilateral attacks against the perceived enemies of the state and the perceived enemies of the people of the United States of America.

About the political utility of comparing Osama bin Laden, leader of al-Qaeda, to Emmanuel Goldstein, leader of The Brotherhood, in 11 September 2001: War, Terror and Judgement (2002), Bülent Gökay and R.B.J. Walker wrote:

Goldstein is the Osama Bin Laden figure in Orwell's novel [Nineteen Eighty-Four (1949)], an extremely elusive person who is never seen, never captured, but believed by the leadership of Oceania to be still alive and hatching his conspiracies: perhaps somewhere beyond the sea, under the protection of his foreign paymasters. Since Goldstein is never captured, the battle against his crimes, treacheries, sabotages must never end.

In Worst-Case Scenarios (2009), the jurist Cass Sunstein coined the term the Goldstein Effect to describe a government's "ability to intensify public concern, by giving a definite face to the adversary, specifying a human source of the underlying threat." In the case of the American war on terrorism (2001), the government of the U.S. and the American news media respectively identified Saddam Hussein of Iraq (r. 1979–2003) and Osama bin Laden, of Saudi Arabia, as synonymous with terrorism, which parallels The Party's psychological manipulations of the population of Oceania with and during the sessions of Two Minutes' Hate featuring the sights and sounds of the wars and conspiracies of Emmanuel Goldstein and The Brotherhood against Oceania, The Party, and Big Brother.

=== George Soros ===
In "The Ironies of George Soros's Foundation Leaving Budapest" (2018), the pseudonymous author, M.S., claimed that in right-wing Hungarian politics, the politically progressive billionaire financier George Soros is used as a Goldstein figure, an enemy of the people of Hungary, propagating conspiracy theories about Soros seeking to impose a foreign ideology upon the Hungarian people:

Mr Orbán's Fidesz party campaigned in the recent election by plastering the country with ominous posters of Mr Soros. He has come to serve the same role for the [Orbán] government as Emmanuel Goldstein did for the totalitarian state [of Oceania] in George Orwell's 1984: A mythical, shadowy enemy used to focus people's hatred, and whose imaginary schemes supposedly justify the régime's complete grip on power.
