= Thoughtcrime =

Unapproved thinking in Nineteen Eighty-Four

In the 1949 dystopian novel Nineteen Eighty-Four, thoughtcrime, also known as crimethink in the official language of Newspeak, is the offense of thinking in ways not approved by the ruling Ingsoc party. It describes the intellectual actions of a person who entertains and holds politically unacceptable thoughts; thus the government of The Party controls the speech, actions, and thoughts of the citizens of Oceania.

== Thought control ==
In the story of Nineteen Eighty-Four, the Thinkpol (Thought Police) are responsible for the detection and elimination of thoughtcrime, and for the social control of the populations of Oceania, by way of audio-visual surveillance and offender profiling. Such psychological monitoring allows the Thought Police to detect, arrest, and kill thoughtcriminals, citizens whose independence (intellectual, mental, and moral) challenges the political orthodoxy of Ingsoc (English Socialism) and thus the legitimate government authority of the Party. In the detection of thoughtcrime—and to overcome the physical impossibility of simultaneously policing every citizen of Oceania—the Thinkpol spy upon the populace through ubiquitous two-way telescreens, and so can monitor any person's body language, reflexive speech, and facial expressions:

Any sound that Winston made, above the level of a very low whisper, would be picked up by the telescreen; moreover, so long as he remained within the field of vision which the metal plaque commanded, he could be seen as well as heard. There was, of course, no way of knowing whether you were being watched at any given moment. How often, or on what system, the Thought Police plugged in on any individual wire was guesswork.

— Part I, Chapter 1, Nineteen Eighty-Four

The universal, physical presence of the telescreen, in public and in private spaces, exerted psychological pressure upon each citizen of Oceania to presume that they were under constant Thinkpol surveillance, and thus in danger of detection and arrest as a thought criminal; thus, whenever near a telescreen, Winston Smith was always mindful of that possibility: "If you made unexpected movements, they yelled at you from the telescreen." Such surveillance methods allowed the Thinkpol and the Ministry of Love (Miniluv) to become universally feared by the citizens of Oceania, especially by the members of the Outer Party, which includes Winston Smith.

=== Crimestop ===
In the Newspeak vocabulary, the word crimestop denotes eliminating oneself of unwanted, incorrect thoughts (personal and political), the discovery of which, by the Thinkpol, could lead to detection, arrest, and interrogation at Miniluv (the Ministry of Love). The protagonist, Winston Smith, describes crimestop as a conscious process of self-imposed cognitive dissonance:

The mind should develop a blind spot whenever a dangerous thought presented itself. The process should be automatic, instinctive. Crimestop, they called it in Newspeak. ... He set to work to exercise himself in crimestop. He presented himself with propositions—'the Party says the Earth is flat', 'the Party says that ice is heavier than water'—and trained himself in not seeing or not understanding the arguments that contradicted them.

Moreover, from the perspective of Oceania's principal enemy of the state, in the history book The Theory and Practice of Oligarchical Collectivism, Emmanuel Goldstein said that:

Crimestop means the faculty of stopping short, as though by instinct, at the threshold of any dangerous thought. It includes the power of not grasping analogies, of failing to perceive logical errors, of misunderstanding the simplest arguments if they are inimical to Ingsoc, and of being bored or repelled by any train of thought which is capable of leading in a heretical direction. Crimestop, in short, means protective stupidity.

== Contemporary English usage ==
In contemporary English usage, the word thoughtcrime describes personal beliefs that are contrary to the accepted norms of society; thus thoughtcrime describes the theological practices of disbelief and idolatry, and the rejection of an ideology.

A similar term, wrongthink, was used in 2014 on the US alt-right in a subreddit called r/SRSSucks, an anti-political-correctness community and use of the term increased in 2017 after James Damore was terminated from Google for a memo in which he claimed that disparities between men and women in coding might be partly attributable to biology. In 2023, Wrongthink was used on the video platform Rumble and as the name for a social media platform.

== Analogy in Iran ==
Various groups such as human rights organizations, journalists, and activists have likened the Iranian regime, along with the IRIB and IRGC, to an Orwellian government. This sentiment is due to reports of the Iranian government distributing death sentences for the crime of "advertising against the holy system". "Zabane eghelab", an Iranian phrase that translates to "tongue of revolution", is used to describe the rhetoric used by the government to maintain ideological dominance over the population and is often compared to newspeak.

== See also ==
- Censorship
- Cogitationis poenam nemo patitur
- Freedom of thought
- Hate speech
- Internal sin
- Mens rea
- Pre-crime
- Secret police
- Victimless crime
