= Political geography of Nineteen Eighty-Four =

Three fictional superstates in the novel 1984 by George Orwell

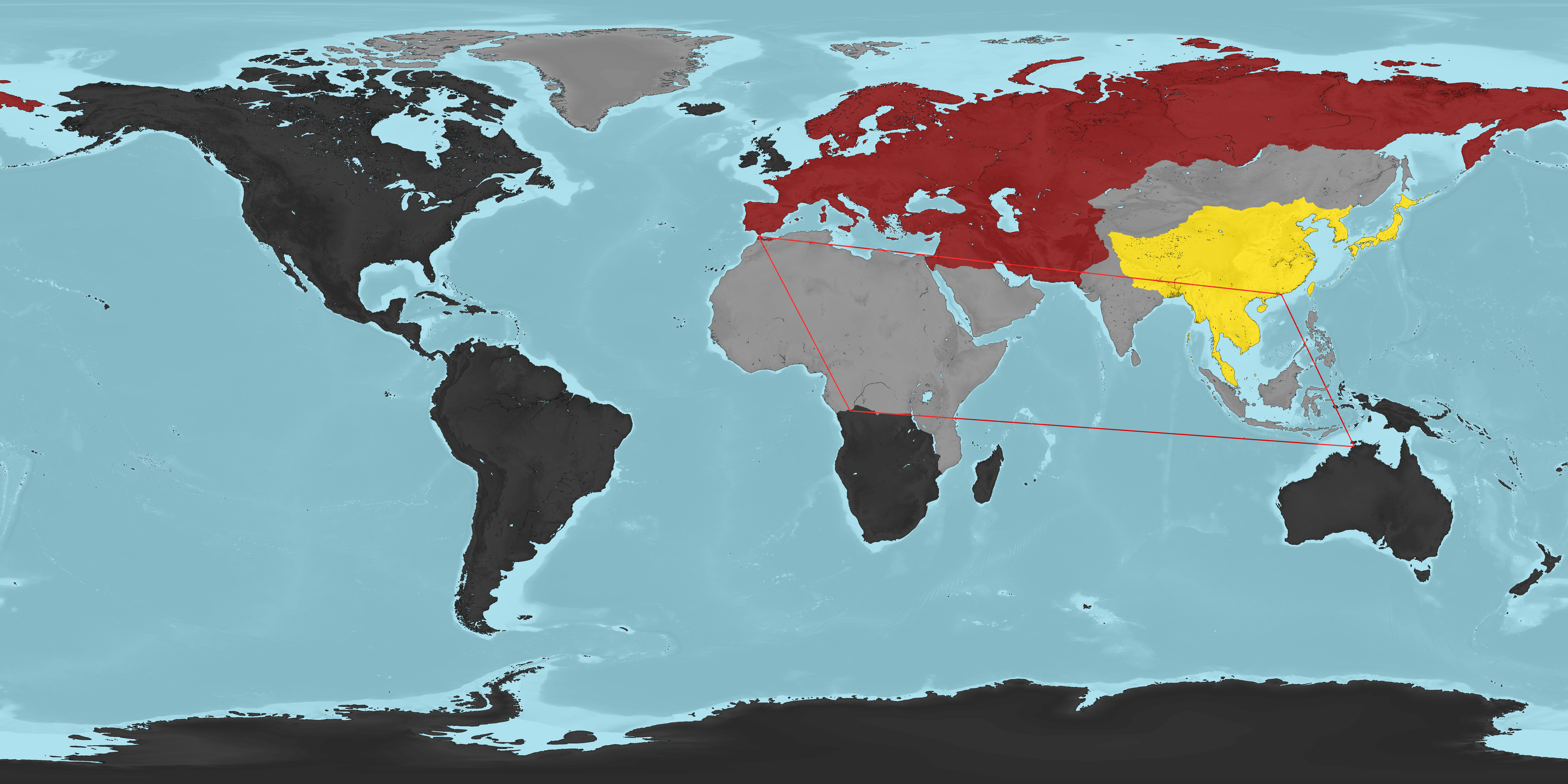
The three fictional superstates of the dystopian novel Nineteen Eighty-Four are Oceania (black), Eurasia (red), and Eastasia (yellow). 'Disputed territories' are indicated in grey.

In George Orwell's 1949 dystopian novel Nineteen Eighty-Four, the world is divided into three superstates: Oceania, Eurasia and Eastasia, which are all fighting each other in a perpetual war in a disputed area mostly located around the equator. All that Oceania's citizens know about the world is whatever the Party wants them to know, so how the world evolved into the three states is unknown; and it is also unknown to the reader whether they actually exist in the novel's reality, or whether they are a storyline invented by the Party to advance social control. The nations appear to have emerged from nuclear warfare and civil dissolution over 20 years between 1945 and 1965, in a post-war world where totalitarianism becomes the predominant form of ideology, through English Socialism of Oceania, Neo-Bolshevism of Eurasia, and Death-Worship of Eastasia.

== Sourcing ==
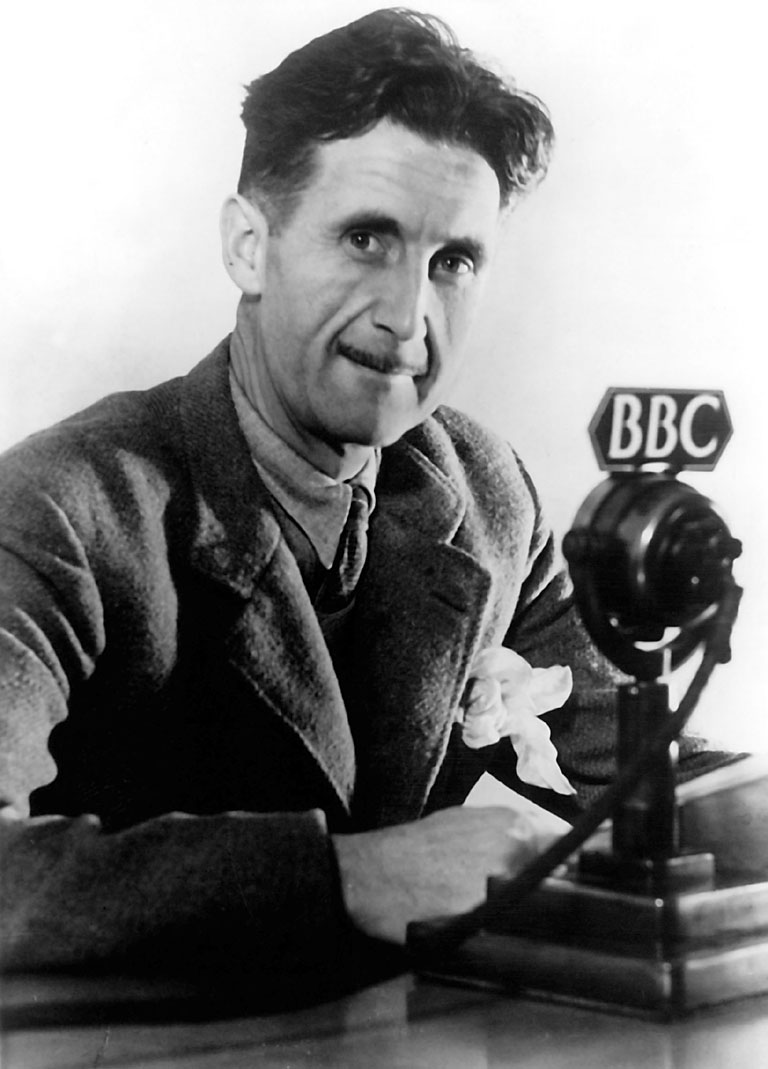
George Orwell, author of Nineteen Eighty-Four, whose wartime BBC career influenced his creation of Oceania

What is known of the society, politics and economics of Oceania, and its rivals, comes from the in-universe book, The Theory and Practice of Oligarchical Collectivism by Emmanuel Goldstein, a literary device Orwell uses to connect the past and present of 1984. Orwell intended Goldstein's book to parody Trotsky's (on whom Goldstein is based) The Revolution Betrayed: What Is the Soviet Union and Where Is It Going?, published in 1937. Within the novel, the copy of The Theory and Practice of Oligarchical Collectivism read by Winston is later shown to have been written by members of The Party, meaning that any information within is of doubtful veracity (such as the amount of territory ruled by each state and the nature of their regimes).

== Descriptions ==
=== Oceania ===
Oceania was founded following an anti-capitalist revolution, which, while intended to be the ultimate liberation of its proletariat (proles), soon ignored them. It is stated that Oceania formed after the United States merged with the British Empire. The text, however, does not indicate how the Party obtained the power it possesses or when it did so. The state is composed of "the Americas, the Atlantic Islands, including the British Isles, Australasia and the southern portion of Africa". Oceania's political system, Ingsoc, uses a cult of personality to venerate the ruler, Big Brother, as the Inner Party exercises day-to-day power.

Food rationing, which does not affect Inner Party members, is in place. Winston considers the geography as now stands:

Even the names of countries, and their shapes on the map, had been different. Airstrip One, for instance, had not been so called in those days: it had been called England, or Britain, though London, he felt fairly certain, had always been called London.

The countryside outside of London is noted not as a place for enjoying the contrast with the city but rather for use as a purely practical grounds of exercise.

An imagining of the Ingsoc flag

Oceania is made up of provinces. The province of "Airstrip One" is "miserable and run-down" with London consisting almost solely of "decaying suburbs". It is the third most populous province in Oceania, but London is not the capital, for Oceania has none. This decentralisation enables the Party to ensure that each province of Oceania feels itself to be the centre of affairs, and it prevents them from feeling colonised, for there is no distant capital to focus discontent on.

85% of Oceania's population are proles, with most of the remainder presumably in the Outer Party; 2% rule as members of the Inner Party. According to political scientist Craig Carr, Winston yearns for revolution and a return to a time before Oceania, but "no revolution is possible in Oceania. History, in Hegelian terms, has ended. There will be no political transformations in Oceania: political change has ended because Big Brother will not let it happen."

A totalitarian and highly formalised state, Oceania also has no law, only crimes, says Lynskey. Nothing is illegal; social pressure is used to exert control, in place of law. It is hard for many Outer Party members to know when they are in breach of Party expectations; and they are in a state of permanent anxiety, unable to think too deeply on any subject whatsoever so as to avoid "thoughtcrime". For example, Winston begins to write a diary and does not know if this is a forbidden offence but he is reasonably certain that it is. In Oceania, to think is to do and no distinction is drawn between either. Criticism of the state is forbidden, even though criticism must be constant for the state's survival, since it must have critics to destroy so as to demonstrate the state's power. Governance of Oceania depends upon the necessity of suppressing freedom of thought or original thinking amongst the Outer Party (the "proles" are exempted from this as they are deemed incapable of having ideas but potentially dangerous "proles" are monitored by the Thought Police and liquidated).

The state is highly bureaucratic. Winston notes that myriad committees are responsible for administration and are "liable to hold up even the mending of a window-pane for two years". The rulers of Oceania, the Inner Party, says Orwell, were once the intelligentsia, the "bureaucrats, scientists, technicians, trade-union organizers, publicity experts, sociologists, teachers, journalists, and professional politicians". The state's national anthem is Oceania, 'Tis for Thee. The official language of Oceania is Newspeak. The official currency of Oceania is the dollar; in Airstrip One, the pound sterling has been demonetised.

=== Eurasia ===
Eurasia comprises "the whole of the northern part of the European and Asiatic landmass from Portugal to the Bering Strait". Eurasia was formed after the Soviet Union annexed continental Europe following a war between the Soviet Union and the Allies. The ideology of Eurasia is described as "Neo-Bolshevism."

=== Eastasia ===
Eastasia consists of "China and the countries south to it, the Japanese islands, and a large but fluctuating portion of Manchuria, Mongolia and Tibet". The state's ideology is called by a Chinese name usually translated as Death-Worship, alternatively known as Obliteration of the Self. Eastasia was formed a decade after Eurasia and Oceania in the 1960s, after "confused fighting" between its predecessor nations.

=== International relations ===
The three states have been at war with each other since the 1960s. By 1984 it has become a constant, and they regularly change allegiance with one another. The perpetual conflict among Oceania, Eurasia and Eastasia takes place over a large disputed area, bordering the three states, which includes Northern and Central Africa, the Middle East, the Indian subcontinent, the unstable Eurasian-Eastasian boundary, the Arctic ice pack and the islands in the Indian and Pacific Ocean. The majority of the disputed territories form "a rough quadrilateral with its corners at Tangier, Brazzaville, Darwin and Hong Kong", containing about a fifth of the population of the Earth: whichever power controls it disposes of a significant amount of exploitable manpower. All three states consist primarily of proles. Winston recognises similarities with the other superstates, at one point commenting that "it was curious to think that the sky was the same for everybody, in Eurasia or Eastasia as well as here. And the people under the sky were very much the same."

Each state is self-supporting so they do not war over natural resources, nor is the destruction of the opponent the primary objective; for, even when two states ally against the third, no combination is powerful enough to do so. Each state recognises that science is responsible for its over-production, so science must be carefully controlled lest the proles or Outer Party expect an increased standard of living. From this analysis stems the policy of permanent warfare: by focusing production on arms and materiel (rather than consumer goods) each state can keep its population impoverished and willing to sacrifice personal liberties for the greater good. The peoples of these states—subject to shortages, queues, poor infrastructure and food—"are no longer domesticated or even able to be domesticated", says Carr.

These states all are similar monolithic regimes. Historian Mark Connelly notes that "the beliefs may differ, but their purpose is the same, to justify and maintain the unquestioned leadership of a totalitarian elite". Due to the sheer size of the protagonists, there are, says Connelly, no "massive invasions claiming hundreds of thousands of lives", but instead small-scale, local encounters and conflicts which are then exaggerated for the purposes of domestic propaganda. Connelly describes the fighting between the states as "highly technical, involving small units of highly trained individuals waging battles in remote contested regions". All sides once possessed nuclear weapons, but, following a short-lived resort to them in the 1950s (in which Colchester was hit) they were recognised as too dangerous for any of them to use. As a result, says Connelly, although London could have been destroyed by a nuclear weapon in 1984, it was never hit by anything worse—albeit "20 or 30 times a week"—than "rocketbombs", themselves no more powerful than the V-1s or V-2s of World War Two.

At any moment, however, an alliance could shift and the two states that had previously been at war with each other may suddenly ally against the other. When this happened, the past immediately had to be re-written—newspapers retyped, new photos glued over old—to provide continuity. In many cases that which contradicted the state was simply destroyed. This occurs during Oceania's Hate Week, when it is announced that the state is at war with Eastasia and allied to Eurasia, despite the assembled crowd—including Winston and Julia—having just witnessed the executions of Eurasian prisoners of war. Winston describes how, when the announcer spoke, "nothing altered in his voice or manner or in the content of what he was saying, but suddenly the names were different". Orwell describes the war as one of "limited aims between combatants who are unable to destroy one another, have no material cause for fighting and are not divided by any genuine ideological difference". These wars, suggests the writer Roberta Kalechofsky, "stimulate the news or 'the truth'".

== Analysis ==
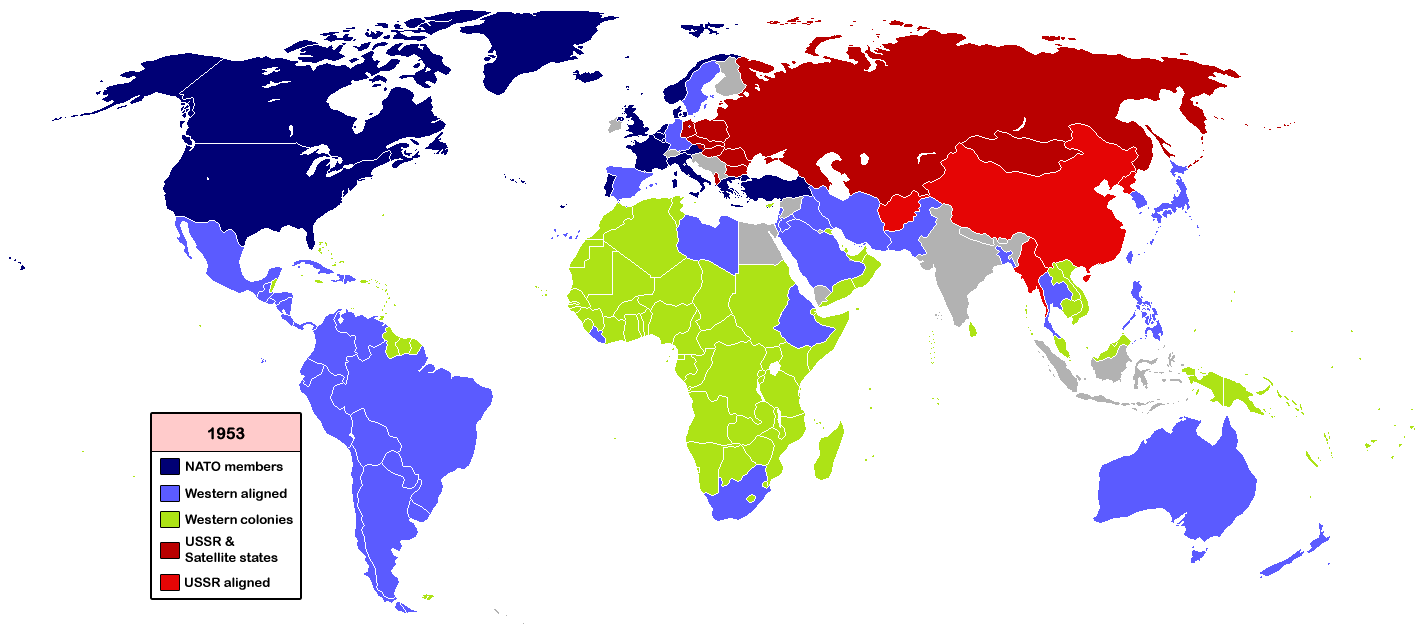
Cold War alliances depicted on a world map for 1953, shortly after the publication of Nineteen Eighty-Four

The superstates of Nineteen Eighty-Four are recognisably based in the world Orwell and his contemporaries knew while being distorted into a dystopia. The critic Alok Rai argues that Oceania, for example, "is a known country", because, while a totalitarian regime set in an alternate reality, that reality is still recognisable to the reader. The state of Oceania comprises concepts, phrases and attitudes that have been recycled—"endlessly drawn upon"—ever since the book was published, though political scientist Craig L. Carr argues that they are also places where "things have gone horribly and irreparably wrong".

Each state is self-supporting and self-enclosed: emigration and immigration are forbidden, as is international trade and the learning of foreign languages. Julia suspects that the war exists for the Party's sake, questioning if it is taking place at all and theorizing that the rocketbombs striking London on a daily basis could have been launched by the Party itself "just to keep people frightened".

The reader is told, through Winston, that the world has not always been this way, and indeed, once was much better; on one occasion with Julia, she produces a bar of old-fashioned chocolate—the chocolate the Party issued tasted "like the smoke from a rubbish fire"—and it brought back childhood memories from before Oceania's creation.

Craig Carr argues that, in creating Oceania and the other warring states, Orwell was not predicting the future, but warning of a possible future if things carried on as they did. In other words, it was also something which could be avoided. Carr continues:

It is altogether easy to pick up Nineteen Eighty-Four today, notice that the year that has come to symbolize the story is now long past, realize that Oceania is not with us, and answer Orwell's warning triumphantly by saying, "We didn't!" It is easy, in other words, to suppose that the threat Orwell imagined and the political danger he foresaw have passed.

=== Contemporary interpretations ===
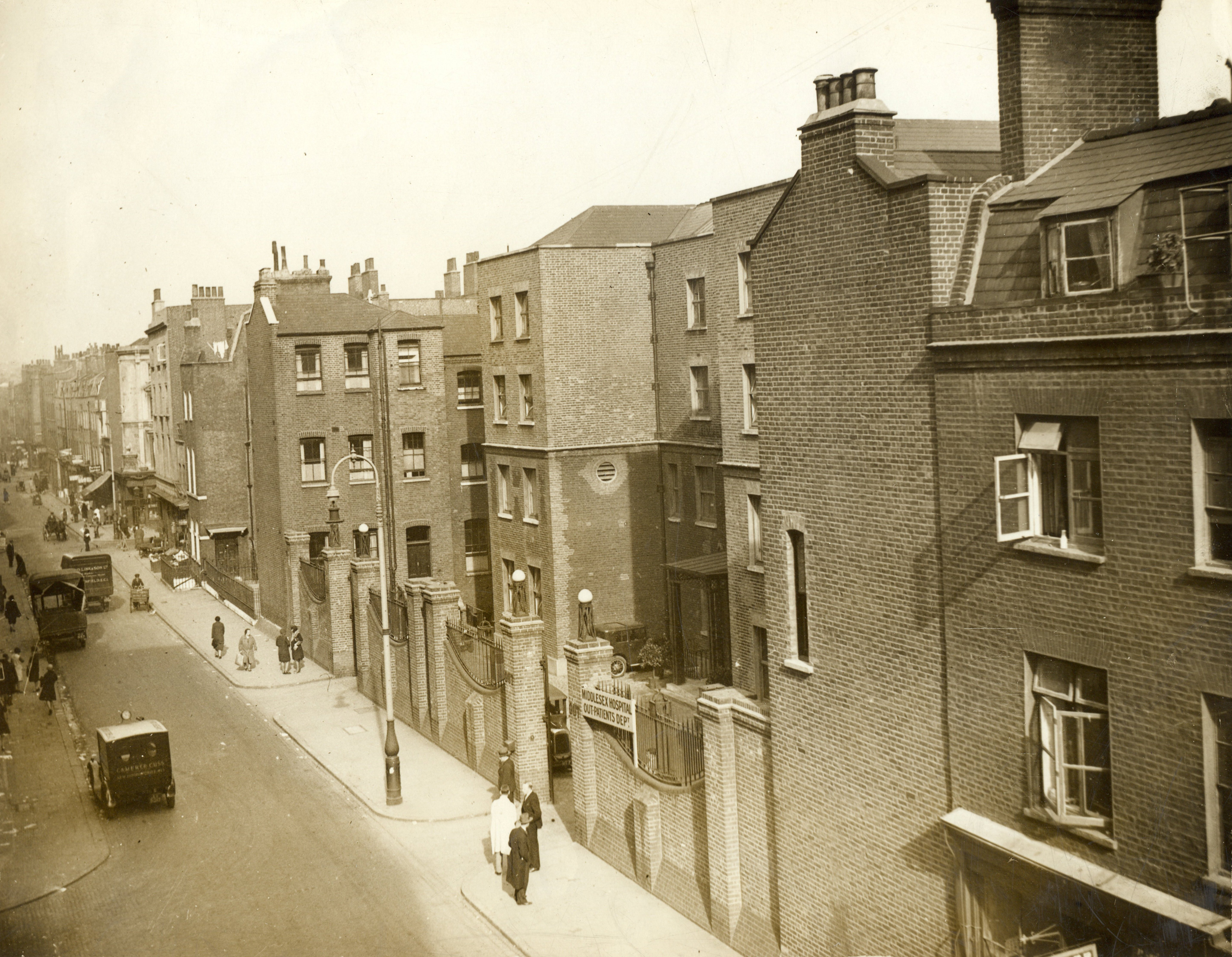
A London street in 1930

Economist Christopher Dent argued in 2002 that Orwell's vision of Oceania, Eurasia and Eastasia "turned out to be only partially true. Many of the post-war totalitarian states have toppled, but a tripolar division of global economic and political power is certainly apparent". That is divided, he suggested, between Europe, the United States and Japan. Scholar Christopher Behrends has commented that the proliferation of US airbases in Great Britain in the 1980s echoes Orwell's classification of the country as an airbase into the European theatre. The legal scholar, Wolfgang Friedmann, argued that the growth of supra-state organisations such as the Organisation of American States, "corresponding to the super-states of Orwell's 1984 ... change would be from the power balances of numerous big and small national states to the more massive and potentially more destructive balance of power between two or three blocs of super-Powers".

Similarly, in 2007, the UK Independence Party group in the European Parliament alleged to the UK's House of Commons' European Scrutiny Committee that the European Commission's stated aim to make Europe a "World Partner" should be taken to read "Europe as a World Power!", and likened it to Orwell's Eurasia. The group also suggested that the germ of Orwell's superstates could already be found in organisations such as not only the EU, but ASEAN and FTAA. Further, the group suggested that the long wars then being waged by American forces against enemies they helped originally create, such as in Baluchistan, were also signs of a germinal 1984-style superstate. Lynskey writes how, in 1949, while Orwell was ill but Nineteen Eighty-Four complete, "the post-war order took shape. In April, a dozen Western nations formed NATO. In August, the Soviet Union successfully detonated its first atom bomb in the Kazakh Steppe. In October, Mao Zedong established the People's Republic of China ... Oceania, Eurasia, Eastasia."

The campaign associated with the allegations about domestic communism in post-war North America, known as McCarthyism, has been compared to the process by which the states of Nineteen Eighty-Four re-write their history, in a process that the political philosopher Joseph Gabel labelled "time mastery". Similarly, Winston and Julia's attempts to contact, and await contact from, members of the secret organisation called the Brotherhood, have been compared to the political strategy of Kremlinology, whereby Western powers studied minute changes in the Soviet government in an attempt to foresee events. The states' permanent low-level war is similar, says scholar Ian Slater, to that in Vietnam, except that, in Orwell's imagination, the war is never-ending. Rai suggests that Oceania, with its labyrinthine bureaucracy, was comparable to the post-war Labour government, which found itself in control of what he terms the "extensive apparatus of economic direction and control" that had been set up to regulate supply at the beginning of the Second World War. According to Rai, London, as described by Winston, is also a perfect match for the post-war city:

He tried to squeeze out some childhood memory that should tell him whether London had always been quite like this. Were there always these vistas of rotting nineteenth-century houses, their sides shored up with baulks of timber, their windows patched with cardboard and their roofs with corrugated iron, their crazy garden walls sagging in all directions? And the bombed sites where the plaster dust swirled in the air and the willow-herb straggled over the heaps of rubble; and the places where the bombs had cleared a larger patch and there had sprung up sordid colonies of wooden dwellings like chicken-houses.

In a review of the book in 1950, Symons notes that the gritty, uncomfortable world of Oceania was very familiar to Orwell's readers: the plain food, milkless tea and harsh alcohol were the staples of wartime rationing which, in many cases, had continued after the war. Critic Irving Howe argues that, since then, other events and countries—North Korea, for example—have demonstrated how close Oceania can be. Oceania is, he suggests, "both unreal and inescapable, a creation based on what we know, but not quite recognisable". Lynskey suggests that Oceania's anthem, "Oceania, Tis For Thee", is a direct reference to the United States (from "America (My Country, 'Tis of Thee)"), as is also, he suggests, the use of the dollar sign as the Oceanian currency denominator.

== Influences ==
The totalitarian states of Nineteen Eighty-Four, although imaginary, were based partly on the real-life regimes of Hitler's Germany and Stalin's Soviet Union. Both regimes used techniques and tactics that Orwell later utilised in his novel: the re-writing of history, the cult of leadership personality, purges and show-trials, for example. The author Czesław Miłosz commented that, in his depictions of Oceanian society, "even those who know Orwell only by hearsay are amazed that a writer who has never lived in Russia should have so keen a perception of Russian life". From a purely literary standpoint, suggests Julian Symons, the superstates of 1984 represent points along a path that also took Orwell from Burma to Catalonia, Spain, and to Wigan in England. Symons argues that, in each location, characters are similarly confined within a "tightly controlled, taboo-ridden" society, and are as suffocated by them as Winston is in Airstrip One. In The Road to Wigan Pier, for example, Orwell examines working-class life in detail; the scene in Nineteen Eighty-Four where Winston observes a prole woman hanging out her washing echoes the earlier book, where Orwell watches a woman, in the back area of a slum dwelling, attempting to clear a drain pipe with a stick.

Orwell's own wartime role in the UK Ministry of Information saw him, says Rai, "experience at first hand the official manipulation of the flow of information, ironically, in the service of 'democracy' against 'totalitarianism'". Orwell noted privately at the time that he could see totalitarian possibilities for the BBC that he would later provide for Oceania. Lynskey argues that, similarly, during World War II, Orwell had to make pro-Soviet broadcasts lauding Britain's ally. After the war—but with a cold war looming—this became an image that needed to be swiftly discarded, and is, according to Lynskey, the historical origin of Oceania's bouleversement in its alliance during Hate Week.

== Comparisons ==
The superstates of Nineteen Eighty-Four have been compared by literary scholars to other dystopian societies such as those created by Aldous Huxley in Brave New World, Yevgeny Zamyatin's We, Franz Kafka's The Trial, B. F. Skinner's Walden Two and Anthony Burgess' A Clockwork Orange, although Orwell's bleak 1940s-style London differs fundamentally from Huxley's world of extensive technical progression or Zamyatin's science- and logic-based society. Dorian Lynskey, in his 2019 history book The Ministry of Truth, also suggests that "equality and scientific progress, so crucial to We, have no place in Orwell's static, hierarchical dictatorship; organised deceit, so fundamental to Nineteen Eighty-Four, did not preoccupy Zamyatin".

== See also ==
- Nineteen Eighty-Four
