= Eduardo Vivancos =

Spanish Esperantist (1920–2020)

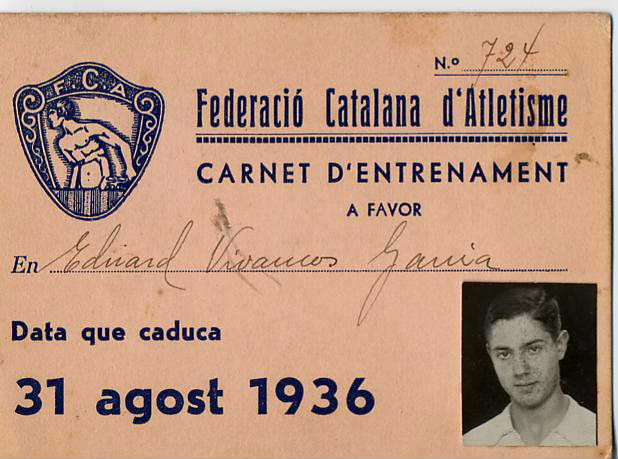
Eduard Vivancos accreditation card for the People's Olympiad

Eduardo Vivancos Garcia (19 September 1920 – 30 December 2020) was an Esperantist mainly active in anarchist circles. He wrote and spoke mainly in Spanish, Catalan and Esperanto.

== Life ==
=== Early years ===
The son of Domingo Vivancos Eduardo Vivancos (who sometimes went by the Esperanto version of his name Vivankos) was born in Barcelona, into a working-class family interested in politics and social activism. In July 1934 he completed his studies at elementary school and was soon hired on as an apprentice, roughly two months before his fourteenth birthday. In that same year in September he started studying in the evenings in a workers school (Escuela del Trabajo). While there he encountered a group of very active young people who were members of The Iberian Federation of Libertarian Youth (FIJL), he would soon join the group. He would also become a member of the Student Federation of Free Thinkers (Federación Estudiantil de Conciencias Libres).

In 1935, he became a member of Confederación Nacional del Trabajo (CNT) a large and very active Anarcho-syndicalist labour union. He would remain a member of the CNT for the rest of his life.

In September 1936, during the revolutionary atmosphere of the still early days of the Spanish Civil War Vivancos started learning Esperanto by taking a course in the language organised by the Popular Encyclopaedic Athenium (Ateneu Enciclopèdic Popular), the course instructor was Francesc Surinyac, a member of the Proletarian Esperanto Union of the Iberian and American Nations (Prolet-Esperantista Unio de Iber-Amerikaj Landoj) PUIL. He quickly grew into an enthusiastic propagandist for the language and quickly established a long list of international contacts from many different countries.

In 1937, the Spanish Republic created a number of Workers Institutes (Institutos Obreros) a sort of high school system for workers. After four severe entrance exams Vivancos finally passed and started his studies on 20 December of that year.

However, his studies soon stalled as the military situation continued to deteriorate. By April 1938 the Fascist army had entered into Catalunya and the situation became critical. Vivancos and a group of Libertarian Youth at his Institute enthusiastically decided to volunteer for military service to defend the Republic. They volunteered for a battalion in the 26th division of the Durruti Column. Surprisingly, his commanding officer Ginés Martínez was also an Esperantist and the division had its Esperanto group which regularly received the Esperanto language information bulletin (Informa Bulteno) of the CNT/FAI. At the battle front in Lleida Vivancos would begin teaching Esperanto while serving in the combat zone.

In February 1939, Vivancos and several thousand other Libertarians and Republicans had to leave Spain as exiles. Vivancos had to leave the country by crossing the Pyrenees on foot, while in France Vivancos would spend over six years in concentration camps set up by the French government to hold refugees from the Spanish civil war. Despite his long period of internment Vivancos past some of the time by continuing to teach and correspond with other Esperantist inmates in the concentration camps of Le Vernet, Bram, Agde, Argelès etc. For several months in 1940 Vivancos shared a barracks with the famous Catalan poet and fellow Esperantist Jaume Grau Casas, the author of the famous "Catalonian Anthology".

It was during these years that Vivancos's family became separated, Vivancos and his father would not be able to meet his mother and sister (also an Esperantist called Juliette Ternant) until 1947.

=== Post War Years ===
After the end of World War II, Vivancos moved to Paris; while there, he met Ramona Comella the daughter of Spanish exiles., they would marry on 5 December 1945. They had two children, Floreal (1947) and Talia (1948). Also while in Paris, Vivancos joined the World Anational Association (Sennacieca Asocio Tutmonda) or SAT

In those days, the Spanish Libertarian Movement began reorganising in France, a congress of the FIJL was organised and held in Toulouse in 1946 and one of its decisions was to create a committee to support the founding of an international organisation for young Anarchists. Vivancos was member of that committee as a delegate for what was called the Spanish federation. At the same time he became active in setting up the Esperanto language newspapers Black Flag (Nigra Flago) and Anti-statist (Senŝtatano) becoming its editor. He worked closely with friends such as Germinal Garcia, also known by his pen name Victor Garcia.

These years were spent building relationships with Anarchists from around the world mainly using Esperanto as a bridge. Among some the more well known collaborators with Vivancos were Yamaga Taiji from Japan, Lu Chen Bo from China, Hartvig Johansson from Sweden and Eugene Lanti who was then living in Mexico. The relationship with Yamaga would prove especially fruitful, by using Yamaga's Esperanto translation of the Dao De Qing by the ancient Chinese philosopher Laoziu, Vivancos created and published a Spanish translation of that work under the title "Libro del Camino y de la Virtud" in 1963.

=== In Canada ===
By 1954, it became clear that the long-awaited collapse of the Franco regime was still far away. So Vivancos and his family emigrated to Toronto, Canada. Shortly after he became active as a senior member of SAT in Canada and remained in that position for more than 30 years. He was also active in the Esperanto circles of Toronto and the Canadian Esperanto Association. In 1973, the SAT group in Canada organised the 43rd SAT Congress, and international gathering of SAT members from many countries from around the world. This was the first time the SAT had held its congress outside of Europe.

While living in Toronto, Vivancos became active in ADEC ("Asociación Democrática Española Canadiense") a pro democracy group for Spanish living in Canada that opposed the Franco regime. For several years, ADEC organised multiple events to denounce the Francoist regime in Spain. It also hosted and publicised many talks and lectures, at which Federica Montseny and Enrique Tierno Galván among others spoke.

After a 37-year exile, Vivancos was finally able to return to Spain in 1976 when the Francoist regime collapsed, there with great emotion he was able to reconnect with old comrades, friends and relatives. Other visits followed, including one in 1986 to give a lecture on the 50th anniversary of the Spanish Revolution for the 59th SAT Congress in Sant Cugat del Vallès. However, he would remain in Canada, and died in Toronto.

== Athletics ==
In addition to his commitment to Anarchism and Esperanto, Vivancos was a committed runner "The first 300 metres I ran the fastest, as much as possible, first of all ... ", he remembered. "When I passed the first kilometre, I ran past half of the other runners ... It wasn't a clever activity, but it was great lesson". He was going to be a participant in the 1936 People's Olympiad in Barcelona, until the rebellion of the Spanish army stopped the games from happening and instead started the Spanish Civil War

== Tributes ==
In his final years, Vivancos was honoured several times. He was remembered in 2017 at the Universal Congress in Seoul with a diploma for Outstanding Performance (Elstara Agado). In the same year, Xavi Alcalde gave a lecture to the 76th Congress of the Spanish Esperanto Association about Vivancos's life. He had was further honoured at the renovation of the SAT offices in Paris, and at the 90th SAT Congress in Korea. Following a resolution of the previous congress, it stated "particularly greets Comrade Eduardo Vivancos, SAT's current oldest comrade, and acknowledges his long-standing commitment and contribution to the SAT movement". In October 2017, during the inaugural speech at the 38th Catalonian Esperanto Congress then happening in Àger, Alcalde reminded the attendees that 80 years ago in the neighbouring mountain range of Montsec Vivancos fought with his fellow young idealists, and that he first taught Esperanto in those trenches. And on the 15 December of that year Edukado.net added him to its Pantheon of Esperanto. In 2018 the North American Anarchist magazine Fifth Estate dedicated an English language article to him on the subject of Anarchism and Esperanto. The Esperanto language publisher Beletra Almanako published (in Esperanto) his diary written during the Spanish Civil War, and Humanitat Nova published the Spanish language version. In 2019 the same magazine published and analysed a satire written by Vivancos during his internment in the Bram concentration camp. In the same year during the 92nd SAT congress in Barcelona Vivancos was honoured in many ways, including with the publication of his book Unu lingvo por ĉiuj: Esperanto (Esperanto: One Language for Everyone).

On the occasion of his centenary in 2020, as part of the World Esperanto Festival, UEA dedicated the first day of veterans to him. In addition, a comprehensive article on his life appeared in the Canadian bulletin La Riverego (The River), and SAT published his work in Sennaciulo and Sennacieca Revuo.

== Works ==
- Notes from my Diary (1937–38) published for the first time by Beletra Almanako in 2018.
- The History of Senŝtatano (1953). Published in Senŝtatano
- "Libro del camino y de la virtud " (1963), translation of the classical work of Laozi in Spanish, translated from the Esperanto version written by Yamaga Taiji.
- Some Concerns with the 53rd Universal Congress in Madrid. (1968) republished in 2020 in Sennaciulo.
- Esperanto; A language for everyone (1974). Published in the Venezuelan magazine "Ruta", number 17, February 1974.
- 50th Anniversary of the Spanish Revolution.(1986). Lecture given during the 59th SAT congress in Sant Cugat, published in Sennacieca Revuo 2020.
- The Other Olympic Games in Barcelona (1992) First published in the Catalan language for La Flama, bulletin of the Catalan Centre of Toronto.

== Bibliography ==
- Javier Alcalde, "Eduardo Vivancos and the libertarian Esperanto", afterword to a bilingual edition by Eduardo Vivancos, One language for all: Esperanto, Calúmnia, 2019, p. 77-91.
