= List of Esperanto speakers =

Person speaking or using the international language Esperanto

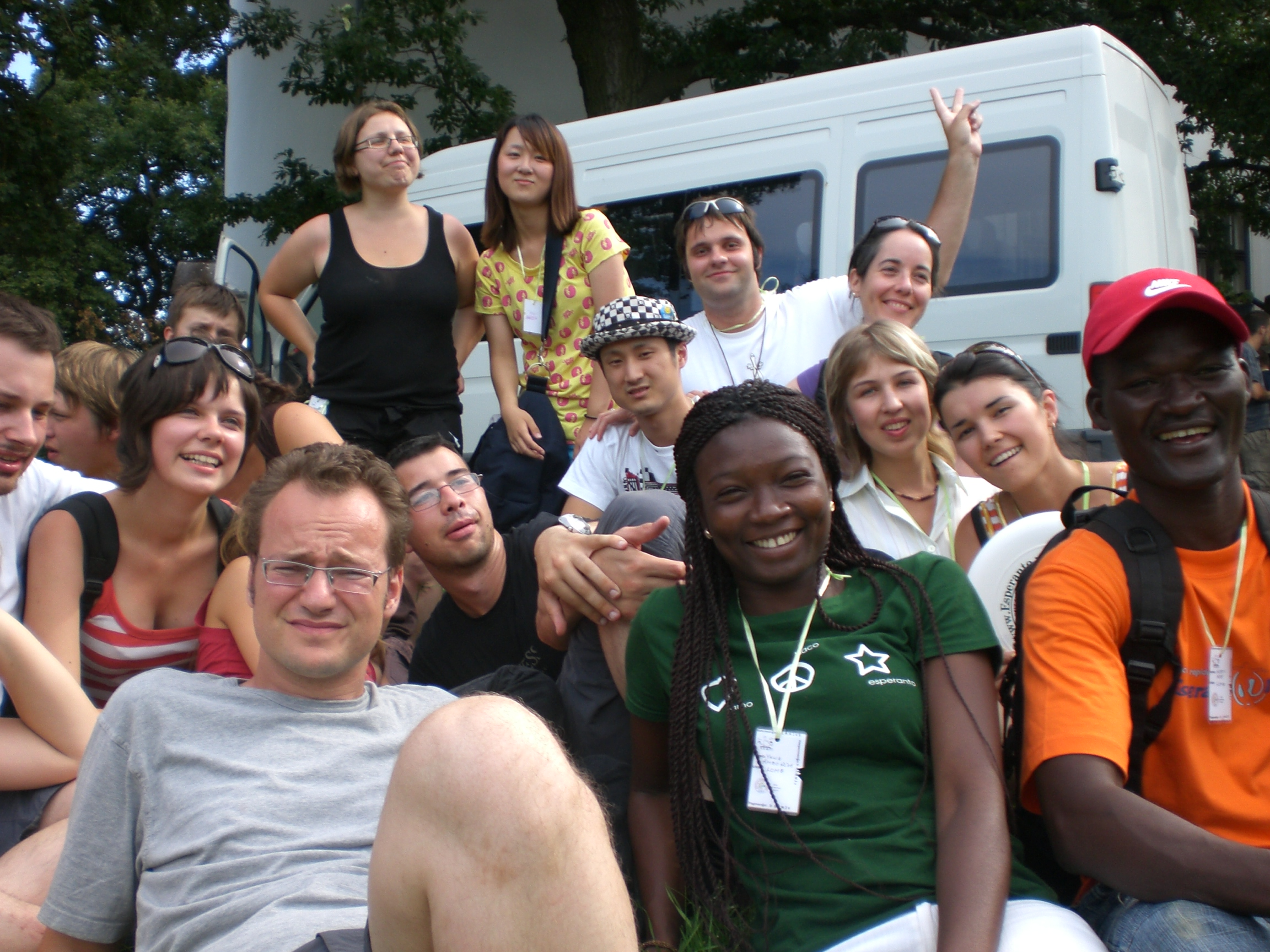
Esperanto speakers at the 2008 International Youth Congress

An Esperantist (Esperanto: esperantisto) is a person who speaks, reads or writes Esperanto. According to the Declaration of Boulogne, a document agreed upon at the first World Esperanto Congress in 1905, an Esperantist is someone who speaks Esperanto and uses it for any purpose.

== List ==
=== Important Esperantists ===
- Muztar Abbasi, Pakistani scholar, patron in chief of PakEsA, translated the Quran and many other works into Esperanto
- William Auld, eminent Scottish Esperanto poet and nominee for the Nobel Prize in Literature
- Julio Baghy, poet, member of the Akademio de Esperanto and "Dad" ("Paĉjo") of the Esperanto movement
- Henri Barbusse, French writer, honorary president of the first congress of the Sennacieca Asocio Tutmonda
- Kazimierz Bein, "Kabe", prominent Esperanto activist and writer who suddenly left the Esperanto movement without explanation
- Émile Boirac, French writer and first president of the Esperanto language committee (later the Akademio de Esperanto)
- Barry Friedman, well-known Esperanto-language author and translator
- Antoni Grabowski, Polish chemical engineer, the father of Esperanto poetry
- Lou Harrison, American composer of Esperanto music and translator of Sanskrit texts into Esperanto
- Julia Isbrücker, Dutch Esperantist
- Jouzas Kazlauskas, Lithuanian Esperantist and photographer
- Boris Kolker, Esperantist scholar and key member of the Akademio de Esperanto
- Georges Lagrange, French Esperantist writer
- Eugène Lanti, French Esperantist, founder of Sennacieca Asocio Tutmonda
- John Edgar McFadyen, Scottish theologist and linguist
- Wasaburo Oishi, Japanese meteorologist and the second board president of the Japanese Esperanto Institute from 1930 to 1945; published his discovery of jet streams in Esperanto
- Frederic Pujulà i Vallès, pioneer of Esperanto in Spain
- Louisa Frederica Adela Schafer, English Esperanto translator of hymns and languages teacher
- Khailan Syamsu, pioneer of Esperanto in Indonesia, South Asia and within Islam.
- Sándor Szathmári, leading figure of Esperanto literature
- Anna Tuschinski, prominent Esperantist in the Free City of Danzig; "Mother of Esperanto"
- L. L. Zamenhof, Polish ophthalmologist, inventor of Esperanto

=== Politicians ===
- Kazimierz Badowski, member of the Communist Party of Poland, promoted Esperanto as part of the Trotskyism movement
- Richard Bartholdt, U.S. Representative from Missouri
- Robert Cecil, 1st Viscount Cecil of Chelwood, one of the architects of the League of Nations, awarded the Nobel Peace Prize
- Parley P. Christensen, Utah and California politician
- Willem Drees, Dutch politician, Prime Minister of the Netherlands (1948–1958)
- Alexander Dubček, head of state of Czechoslovakia that grew up on a utopian and Esperantist cooperative called Interhelpo
- Heinz Fischer, President of the Republic of Austria
- Małgorzata Handzlik, Polish member of the European Parliament
- Ho Chi Minh, President of North Vietnam
- Jean Jaurès, French politician that proposed to the International Socialist Congress at Stuttgart in 1907 the use of Esperanto for the information diffused by the Brussels Office of the organization
- Franz Jonas, President of the Republic of Austria, Secretary of the Austrian Laborist Esperantist League and founder of Internacio de Socialistaj Esperantistoj ("International of Socialist Esperantists")
- Joseph Stalin, General Secretary of the Communist Party of the Soviet Union, was said to have studied Esperanto by Leon Trotsky, though he later killed many Esperantists
- Graham Steele, Canadian lawyer, author, and former politician
- Josip Broz Tito, head of state of Yugoslavia

=== Writers ===
- Nadija Hordijenko Andrianova, Ukrainian writer and translator
- Maria Angelova, Bulgarian poet
- Ba Jin, prolific Chinese novelist and chairman of Chinese Writer Association
- Jane Baird, Scottish educator and one of the three compilers of the Edinburgh Esperanto Pocket Dictionary
- Henri Barbusse, French writer, and honorary president of the first congress of the Sennacieca Asocio Tutmonda
- Louis de Beaufront, Esperantist writer
- Gerrit Berveling, Dutch Esperantist poet, translator and editor of the Esperanto literary review, Fonto
- Marjorie Boulton, British writer and poet in English and Esperanto; researcher and writer
- Louise Briggs, translator of Shakespeare works and children's songs into Esperanto and teacher
- Jorge Camacho, Spanish Esperantist writer
- Vasili Eroshenko, Russian writer, Esperantist, linguist, and teacher
- Petr Ginz, native Esperanto speaking boy who wrote an Esperanto-Czech dictionary but later died in a concentration camp at age 16; his drawing of the Moon was carried aboard Space Shuttle Columbia, and diary appears in Czech, Spanish, Catalan and Esperanto, and was recently published in English
- Don Harlow, American Esperantist writer and webmaster of the United States Esperanto web-site.
- Harry Harrison, American science fiction author and honorary president of the Esperanto Association of Ireland.
- Hector Hodler, Swiss journalist, translator, organizer, and philanthropist
- Hans Jakob, Swiss writer
- Rosa Junck, Bohemian Esperantist and translator
- Kálmán Kalocsay, Hungarian surgeon, poet, translator, and editor
- Lena Karpunina, Tajik Esperantist short story writer
- Ikki Kita, Japanese fascist author, intellectual and political philosopher
- Georges Lagrange, French Esperanto writer, member of Academy of Esperanto
- Ellen Kate Limouzin, music hall performer, suffragette and writer, aunt of George Orwell, member of Sennacieca Asocio Tutmonda
- Anna Löwenstein, British Esperantist, writer, teacher
- Kenji Miyazawa, Japanese poet and author of children's literature, such as Night on the Galactic Railroad (銀河鉄道の夜)
- Nikolai Vladimirovich Nekrasov, Esperantist writer and translator of the Soviet Union
- Mauro Nervi, Italian poet in the Esperanto language
- Edmond Privat, Swiss author, journalist, university professor, and movement activist
- João Guimarães Rosa, Brazilian novelist, short story writer and diplomat
- Cezaro Rossetti, Scottish Esperantist writer
- Magda Šaturová, Slovak translator who authored multiple Esperanto-Slovak dictionaries.
- Lazër Shantoja, Albanian catholic saint, writer and translator
- René de Saussure, Swiss writer and activist
- Tibor Sekelj, Yugoslav-Hungarian author, explorer and polyglot, member of Academy of Esperanto
- Tivadar Soros, Hungarian Jewish doctor, lawyer, author and editor
- W. T. Stead, well-known philanthropist, journalist and pacifist who was aboard the Titanic when it sank
- Þórbergur Þórðarson (Thorbergur Thortharson), Icelandic writer and Esperantist
- J. R. R. Tolkien
- Leo Tolstoy, Russian writer and philosopher, who claimed he learned how to write Esperanto after two hours of study
- Julian Tuwim, Polish poet and translator
- Vladimir Varankin, Russian writer
- Jules Verne, French author, incorporated Esperanto into his last unfinished work The Barsac Mission
- Halina Weinstein, Polish Esperanto teacher and poet, murdered by Nazis
- Qian Xuantong, Chinese writer and linguist who pushed for the abolition of Classical Chinese, and supported the substitution of Spoken Chinese with Esperanto

=== Scientists ===
- Daniel Bovet, Italian pharmacologist and winner of the 1957 Nobel Prize in Physiology or Medicine, learned Esperanto as a first language
- Sidney S. Culbert, American linguist and psychologist
- Isaj Dratwer, Polish-Jewish bacteriologist and former president of the Esperanto League of Israel
- Bertalan Farkas, Hungarian cosmonaut
- Louis Lumière, French inventor of cinema, said: "The use of Esperanto could have one of the happiest consequences in its effects on international relations and the establishment of peace."
- Fran Novljan, contributed to the promotion of Esperanto in Yugoslavia.
- Wilhelm Ostwald, German Nobel laureate for his seminal work in chemical catalysis
- Mark Pallen, British microbiologist
- Claude Piron, Esperantist, psychologist, and linguist, translator for the United Nations
- Reinhard Selten, German economist and winner of the 1994 Nobel Memorial Prize in Economics because of his work on game theory. He has authored two books in Esperanto on that subject.
- Leonardo Torres Quevedo, Spanish engineer, mathematician and inventor.
- Yrjö Väisälä, Finnish astronomer, discovered asteroids 1421 Esperanto and 1462 Zamenhof
- John C. Wells, British phonetician and Esperanto teacher
- Wladimir Köppen, Russian geographer of German descent
- Marcel Minnaert, Belgian astronomer who worked in Utrecht
- Seok Joo-myung, Korean ecologist who studied and identified native butterflies of Korea
- Claude Roux, French lichenologist and mycologist

=== Others ===
- Sergio Aragonés, cartoonist, said that he speaks "Esperanto and several languages with varied degrees of fluency"
- Baháʼí Faith adherents, many of whom have been involved with Esperanto (see Baháʼí Faith and auxiliary language), Lidia Zamenhof was a Baháʼí; several leading Baháʼís have spoken Esperanto, most notably the Son of Baháʼu'lláh, ʻAbdu'l-Bahá (see John Esslemont)
- Titus Brandsma, Dutch Roman Catholic saint who celebrated mass in Esperanto and is the patron saint of Catholic Esperantists
- Fredrick Brennan, founder of 8chan
- Rudolf Carnap, German-born philosopher
- Onisaburo Deguchi, one of the chief figures of the Oomoto religious movement in Japan and president of the Universala Homama Asocio ("Universal Human-love Association")
- Miyoshi Etsuo, Japanese businessman
- Alfred Hermann Fried, recipient of a Nobel Peace Prize and author of a textbook on Esperanto
- Ebenezer Howard, known for his Garden Cities of To-morrow (1898), the description of a utopian city in which people live harmoniously together with nature
- Franko Luin, Swedish type designer of Slovene nationality
- John E. B. Mayor, English classical scholar, gave a historic speech against Esperanto reformists at the World Congress of Esperanto held at Cambridge
- Frank Merrick, English composer
- Alexander Nedoshivin, Russian tax specialist, one of the founders of the Esperanto Society at Kaunas, Lithuania
- William Main Page, Secretary of Edinburgh Esperanto Society, editor and author
- Pope John Paul II, gave several speeches using Esperanto during his career
- László Polgár, Hungarian chess teacher
- Susan Polgar, Hungarian-American chess grandmaster, taught Esperanto by her father László
- George Soros, Hungarian-American billionaire and son of Esperantist parents; "Soros", a name selected by his father to avoid persecution, means "will soar" in Esperanto
- Daniel Tammet, British autistic savant; he has stated Esperanto is one of the ten languages he speaks
- Marcelle Tiard, French Esperantist who co-founded the Union of Esperantist Women
- Antoon Jozef Witteryck, Belgian publisher and instructor

== See also ==
- Esperanto culture
- Esperanto literature
- Esperanto in popular culture
- Interhelpo

== Sources ==
- This page has been translated from the article fr:Espérantiste on the French Wikipedia, accessed on June 13, 2006.
- Information on William Thomas Stead from the Esperanto Vikipedio article.
