= Anarchism and Esperanto =

Association of anarchism with Esperanto

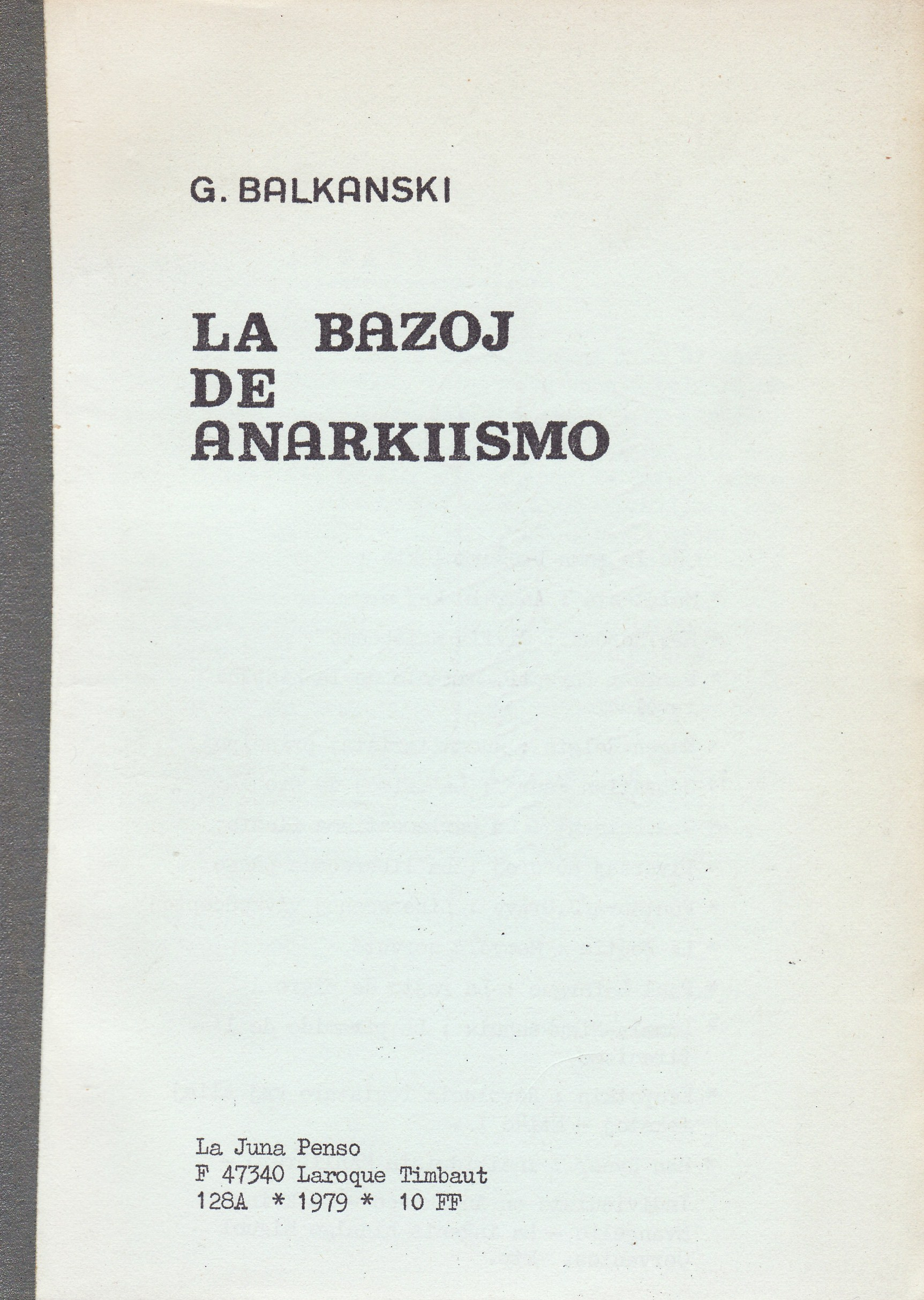
Pamphlet on anarchism in Esperanto

Anarchism and Esperanto have been closely linked since the early days of the Esperanto movement, as anarchists were mobilised by the idea of an international auxiliary language. Several Esperanto anarchist publications were established throughout the early 20th century, and some anarchists have remained active within Esperanto circles into the contemporary period.

== History ==
In 1887, Esperanto was created by L. L. Zamenhof, who intended it to be used as an international auxiliary language. By the turn of the 20th century, it had gained widespread support among anarchists, including Leo Tolstoy and Errico Malatesta. Hundreds of anarchist Esperanto groups were established around the world, from Europe and the Americas to East Asia, with anarchists becoming some of the most prominent advocates of Esperanto use. In China, Liu Shifu published the Esperanto anarchist newspaper La Voĉo de l’Popolo. The International Anarchist Congress of Amsterdam adopted resolutions on Esperanto as an international auxiliary language. In 1906, anarchists established Paco-Libereco (English: Peace-Freedom), which in 1910 merged together with Esperantista Laboristaro to establish Liberiga Stelo (English: Star of Liberation). Before World War II, these organisations published a large amount of Esperanto literature. But with the rise of nationalism during World War I, the Esperanto movement lost much of its support.

Esperanto began to regain ground in the early 1920s, when it was adopted by a resurgent international labour movement. At a conference in Prague in 1921, Esperantists established the Sennacieca Asocio Tutmonda (English: World Anational Association; SAT), which gained thousands of members in dozens of countries. Esperanto became particularly popular among German anarchists, who referred to it as "the people's Latin". In March 1925, the Berlin Group of Anarcho-Syndicatist Esperantists (Esperanto: Berlina Grupo de Anarki-Sindikatismaj Esperantistoj) participated in the second congress of the International Workers' Association (IWA), where it reported that Esperanto had gained such widespread usage in the Free Workers' Union of Germany (FAUD) that Esperantists had established their own organisation, the World League of Stateless Esperantists (TLES). In 1923, the Scientific Anarchist Library of the International Language (Esperanto: Internacian Sciencan Anarkiisman Bibliotekon de la Internacia Lingvo; ISAB) was established in the Soviet Union, where it published translations of the work of Alexei Borovoi and Peter Kropotkin.

By the 1930s, Esperantists were facing heightened political repression, with Soviet Esperantists being sent to the Gulag and the Japanese Esperantists who published La Anarkiisto being imprisoned. Esperanto was later propagated by Spanish anarchists during the Spanish Civil War, when the National Confederation of Labour (CNT) published an Esperanto newspaper and broadcast radio shows in Esperanto. After World War II, Spanish anarchists in Paris began publishing the newspaper Senŝtatano (English: Without a State) and later established an Esperanto radio station under Radio Libertaire. Anarchists also remained active within the SAT, and from 1969, they published their own newspaper, Liberecana Bulteno, which later changed its name to Liberecana Ligilo.

== See also ==
- Taiji Yamaga
- Eduardo Vivancos

== Bibliography ==
- Alcalde, Xavi (2018). "Esperanto & Anarchism. A universal language". Fifth Estate. No. 400. ISSN 0015-0800.
- Firth, Will (1998). "Esperanto and Anarchism". In Jürgen Degen, Hans (ed.). Lexikon der Anarchie. Verlag Schwarzer Nachtschatten. ISBN 3-89041-014-6. OCLC 29629412.
