= Halina Weinstein =

Polish Esperantist (1902–1942)

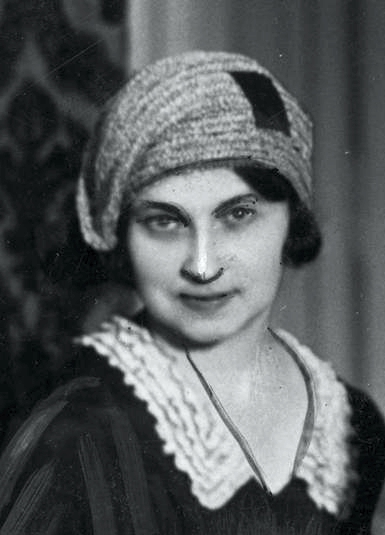
- Halina Weinstein in May 1939
- Born: 4 January 1902; Warsaw, Poland
- Died: 1942 (aged 39–40); Poland
- Education: University of Warsaw
- Occupations: teacher, poet, linguist and Esperantist
- Years active: 1921–1942
- Employer: University of Warsaw
- Organization: Student Esperanto Association

Halina Weinstein (4 January 1902–1942) was a Polish teacher, poet, linguist and Esperantist. She was murdered by Nazi occupying forces.

== Biography ==
Weinstein was born in Warsaw in 1902. Her mother Anna Weinstein was also an Esperantist.

Weinstein was educated at the University of Warsaw's Faculty of Philosophy from 1921. After graduating, she taught Esperanto courses for students of the University. She was a deputy delegate to the Universala Esperanto-Asocio (UEA).

Weinstein also headed the publishing department of the Student Esperanto Association and wrote both poetry and prose in Esperanto.

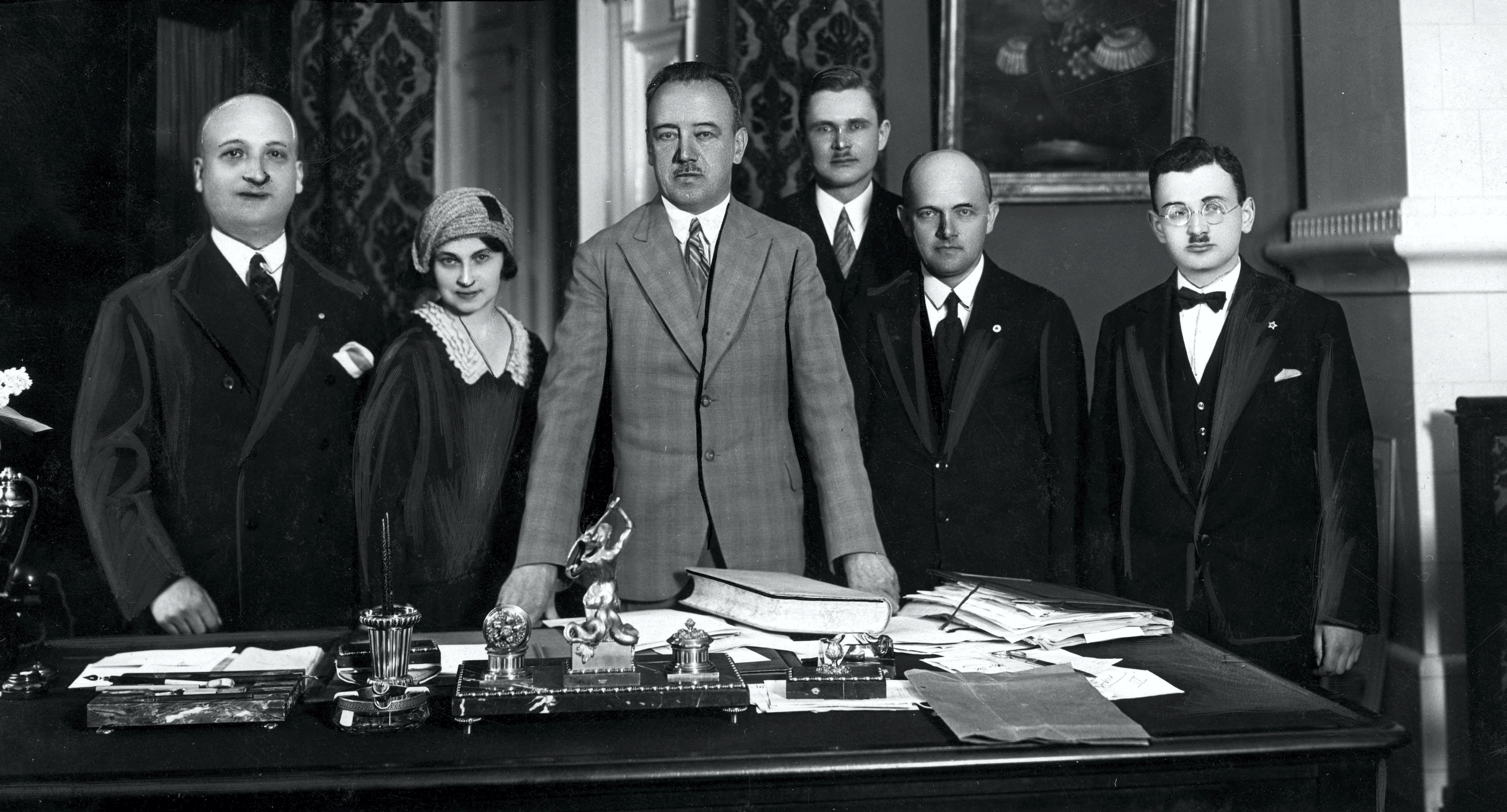
Polish Esperantists, including Weinstein, Antoni Czubrynski and Isaj Dratwer with the Mayor of Warsaw, Zygmunt Słomiński in May 1939

Esperantists were considered an "anti-Reich element" by the Nazi Party, as "to consider Esperanto merely an auxiliary language for international communication would be incorrect. The artificial language Esperanto is part of Esperantist, the weapon of the Jews." Weinstein died in 1942, one of the Nazi murder victims of the occupation of Warsaw.
