= Hans Jakob =

Hans Jakob may refer to:

- Hans Jakob (football player) (1908–1994), German football player
- Hans Jakob (Esperantist) (1891–1967), German-born Swiss Esperantist
