= Miyoshi Etsuo =

Japanese businessman and Esperantist

Etsuo Miyoshi
- 三好鋭郎
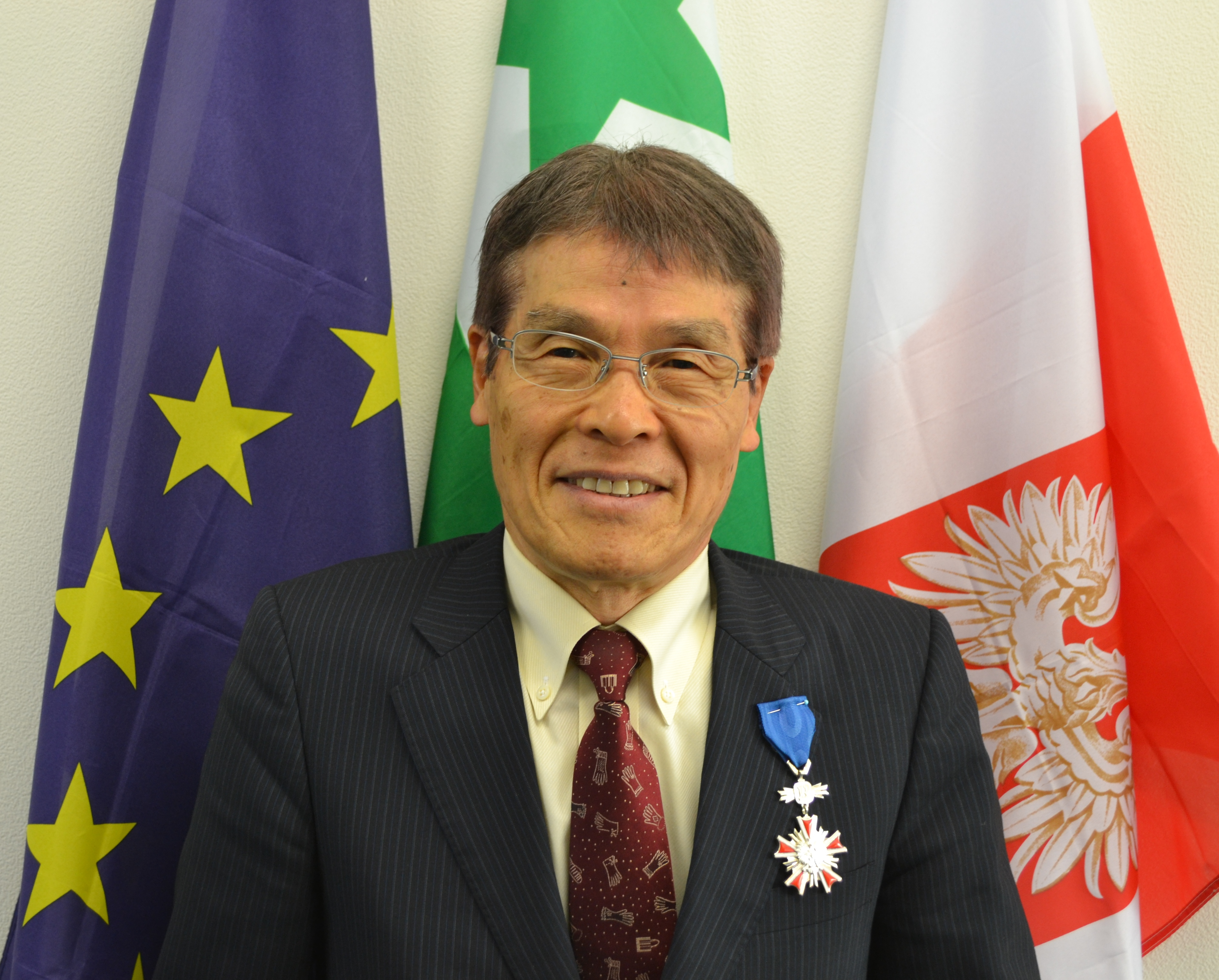
- Born: December 16, 1939 (age 86); Higashikagawa

Etsuo Miyoshi (Japanese: 三好鋭郎, born December 16, 1939, in Higashikagawa) is a Japanese businessman and honorary president of Swany Corporation, which manufactures gloves, suitcases, and wheelchairs. He is one of the most famous Esperantists in Japan.

== Biography ==
=== Entrepreneurship ===
As an entrepreneur, Miyoshi patented the Walkin'Bag suitcase with wheels and a long handle in 1996, which went on sale in 1999. He received a prize from the government in 2007 for bringing the product to market.

In 2009, the Higashikagawa Tourism Union, with Miyoshi's proposal, organized an annual doll exhibition held in October: the exhibition features dolls from different regions of the world in traditional costumes. In 2013, the Polish Minister of Culture took patronage of the exhibition along with the Polish ambassador to Japan. There are about 1,500 dolls in the collection, which is also enriched by Esperantists.

Miyoshi is an honorary member of the religious movement (sect) Oomoto, which supports the spread of Esperanto in the world. He is also vice president of the Kabuki Children's Theater Association.

=== Esperanto ===
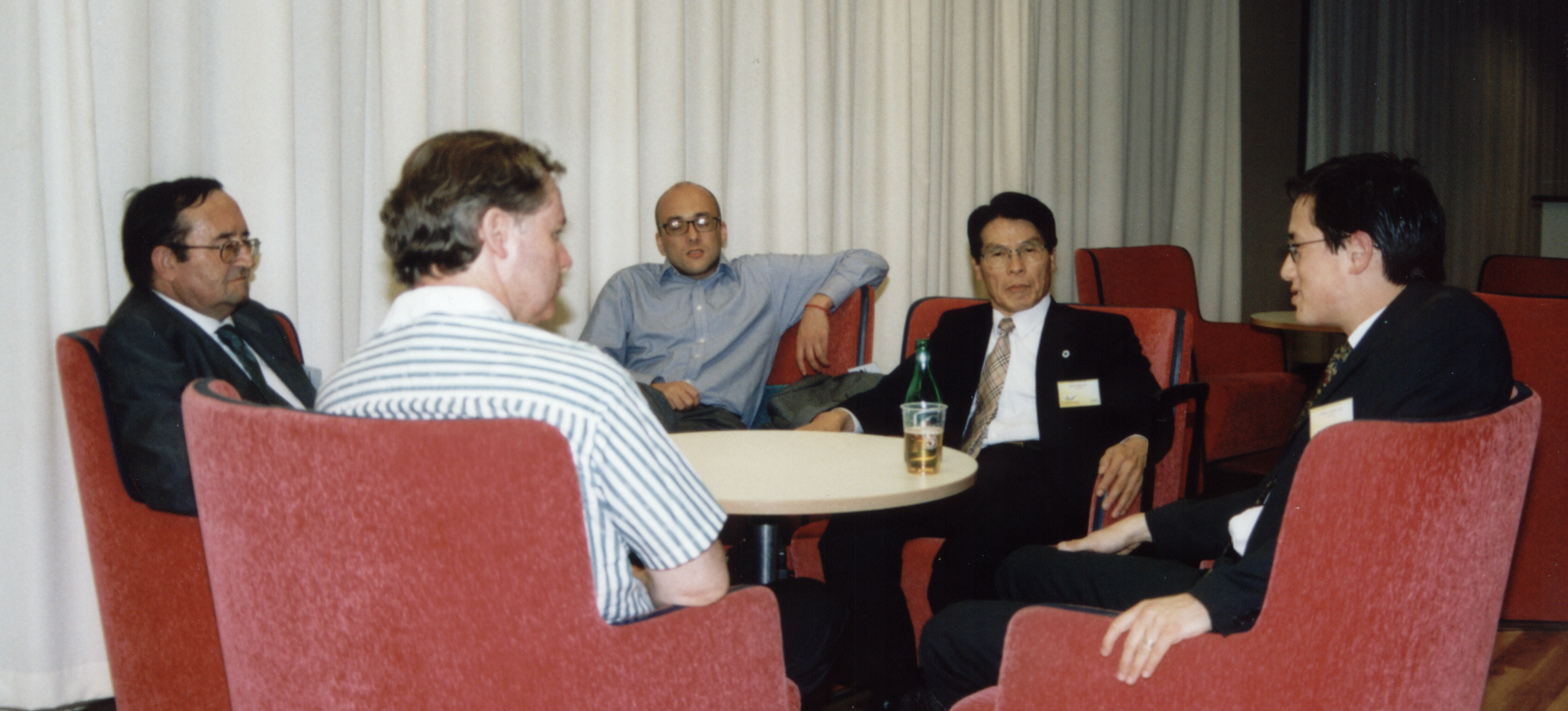
World Esperanto Congress, Gothenburg 2003. Meeting of the European Esperanto Union

Miyoshi has been studying Esperanto since 1995, starting to financially support the Japanese Esperantist movement "Swan"; since the same year he has been the chairman of the Higashikagawa regional Esperantist Association. In 2012 he founded a foundation of the same name, aimed at developing activities for the study and mastery of Esperanto in the European Union.

Miyoshi started to publish Esperanto ads in various European Union magazines and newspapers in 2002 and 2010, including the French publication Le Monde, for which he was awarded the Kenji Osaka Award by the Japanese Esperanto Institute in 2007. He has been an honorary member of the European Union of Esperanto since 2007 and an honorary member of the Polish society Europe–Democracy–Esperanto since 2012.

Since 2001, he has been the director of the World Federalist Movement, supporting the introduction of Esperanto as a second language in every region of the world. In 2011 he was awarded the Order of Merit of the Republic of Poland, 5th degree, for the development of Polish culture and Esperanto in Poland. In 2012 Mijosi suggested organizing a symposium and exhibition "125 Years of Esperanto" in the Polish Parliament.
