= Agnieszka Mozer =

Polish Esperantist

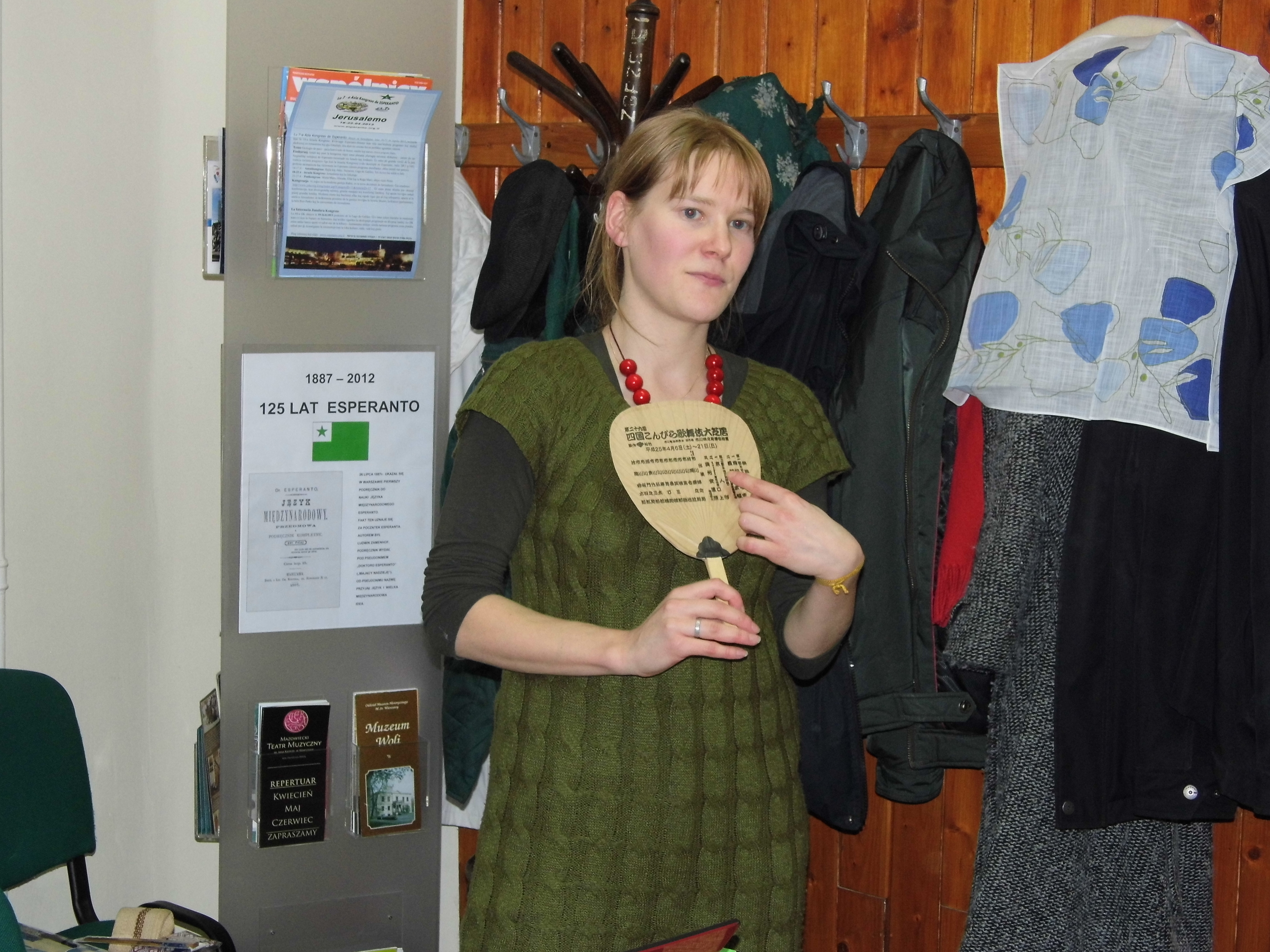
- Mozer in 2013
- Born: October 6, 1986 (age 39); Poland
- Occupation: Esperantist

Agnieszka Mozer (October 6, 1986) is a Polish Esperantist. From November 2010 to 2012 she was president of Polish Esperanto Youth.

Agnieszka Mozer lives in Warsaw and is a member of the Warsaw Wind club. She organised the International Youth Congresses, Action Weeks and Youth E-Weeks.

Since June 2019 she is vice-president of the Polish Esperanto Association.
