= Ellen Kate Limouzin =

British Esperantist, suffragist, and socialist (1870–1950)

- Born: 27 October 1870; Moulmein, Burma
- Died: 21 June 1950 (aged 79)
- Other names: Elaine Limouzin; EKL; Helene Limouzin-Adam
- Education: Bedford High School
- Occupations: suffragette, socialist, music hall performer, writer and Esperanto speaker
- Organization(s): Actresses' Franchise League, Fabian Society, Sennacieca Asocio Tutmonda
- Spouse: Eugène Lanti (m. 1931, died 1947)
- Relatives: George Orwell (nephew)

Ellen Kate Limouzin (27 October 1870 – 21 June 1950) was a British suffragette, socialist, music hall performer, writer and Esperanto speaker. She was the aunt of the author George Orwell and was also known as "Nellie" or "Hélène."

== Early life ==
Limouzin was born in 1870 in Moulmein, Burma, where she spent her childhood. She was half-French and half-English. Limouzin's younger sister Ida Mabel Blair (née Limouzin) became the mother of Eric Arthur Blair, better known as George Orwell. After moving from Burma to Britain, Limouzin and her sisters attended Bedford High School from September 1886.

== Activism and career in Britain ==
Limouzin has been described as "eccentric," "bohemian" and "radical".

In London, she ran a literary salon, and when new editions of two novels were published in 1916 by Oxford University Press (Cranford and Scenes of Clerical Life), Limouzin provided introductory notes. She additionally had a career as an actress in the music halls, taking the stage name "Elaine Limouzin." She performed in vaudeville entertainments and comedic feminist plays.

Limouzin developed friendships with many English leftists, writers and campaigners, such as Edith Nesbit, Conrad Noel, Emmeline Pankhurst, Sylvia Pankhurst, Francis Westrope and Myfanwy Westrope. There is an undated photo of her with the Pankhurst sisters, taken c. 1906–1909 at the Embankment in London.

Limouzin supported the campaign for women's enfranchisement and attended women's suffrage meetings. She chained herself to railings during suffrage protests and was arrested and imprisoned for her militant activism. She was involved in the Actresses' Franchise League, the women's suffrage organisation open to any woman who was or had been in the theatrical profession. She was also a member of the Fabian Society.

== Esperanto ==
Limouzin learned Esperanto, the world's most widely spoken constructed international auxiliary language. She joined the leftist ananational organisation Sennacieca Asocio Tutmonda (SAT, English: World Anational Association) as soon as it formed in 1921. She met the association founder and fellow Esperantist Eugène Adam, better known as Eugène Lanti, when they both attended meetings of the Communist Faction during the 3rd SAT Congress in Kassel, Germany in 1923. Like Limouzin, he was a committed communist, and he had been a revolutionary in Petrograd during the Russian Revolution in 1917. The couple were living together as companions by 1926, and married in 1931 in Paris. Whilst living in Paris with Lanti during the period of les Années folles, Limouzin contributed to radical political journals, wrote letters to newspapers and wrote articles in Esperanto using the pseudonym E.K.L.

In early 1928, Limouzin's nephew George Orwell also moved to live in Paris. She encouraged his literary career, giving him social support, financial support and meals whilst he wrote. Orwell met members of the French intelligenzia through her, including Henri Barbusse, with these contacts leading to Orwell's first published writings. When Orwell went to visit his aunt and her future husband Lanti, the couple conversed in Esperanto at home as Lanti refused to speak French. Orwell suffered as a non-speaker of Esperanto and developed a strong dislike for the language. Some Orwell scholars have suggested that this is why he included elements of Esperanto in the "Newspeak" language he created in his anti-totalitarian novel, Nineteen Eighty-Four.

When Orwell moved back to England, Limouzin helped her nephew to find part time work in Booklovers' Corner in Hampstead, a second hand bookshop owned by her friends the Westropes.

== Death ==
Limouzin's husband Lanti died by suicide in Mexico in 1947, leaving a note asking his survivors to notify the French consul and to send 750 pesos to Limouzin "as my legal wife."

Limouzin died of a haemorrhage into a tumour of her brain in 1950.

== See also ==
- Anarchism and Esperanto
