= Wasaburo Oishi =

Japanese meteorologist (1874–1950)

- 大石 和三郎
- Born: 15 March 1874; Tosu, Saga, Japan
- Died: 18 December 1950 (aged 76)
- Known for: Jet stream
- Awards: Order of the Sacred Treasure
- Scientific career
- Fields: Meteorology
- Institutions: Aerological Observatory

Wasaburo Oishi (大石 和三郎, Ōishi Wasaburō; 15 March 1874 – 18 December 1950) was a Japanese meteorologist. Born in Tosu, Saga, he is best known for his discovery of the high-altitude air currents now known as the jet stream. He was also an important Esperantist, serving as the second board president of the Japanese Esperanto Institute from 1930 to 1945.

== Jet stream and Esperanto ==
He wrote the first official report from Japan's Aerological Observatory (written in 1926 and in the auxiliary language of Esperanto). In this report (Raporto de Aerologia Observatorio de Tateno) data was stratified by season and used to produce the mean seasonal wind profiles. The profile for winter gave the first known evidence of the persistent strong westerlies over Japan that would later become known as the jet stream. In an attempt to reach an unresponsive foreign audience, Wasaburo Oishi published nineteen reports between 1926 and 1944, all of them written in Esperanto, in total 1246 pages. Wasaburo Oishi was not only the director of Japan's Tateno atmospheric observatory but also the head of the Japan Esperanto Society.

== World War II ==
Oishi's studies on the jet stream enabled Japan to attack North America during World War II with at least 9,000 incendiary bombs carried by stratospheric balloons and then dropped by a timer mechanism, potentially causing a forest fire. Very few bombs in this bombing campaign, called Project Fu-Go, actually reached their targets. "Guided by Ooishi's wind charts, 9,000 Fire balloon bombs, called Fu-go, were unleashed by Japan between November 1944 and April 1945." Oishi's wind calculations were wrong, and instead of taking 65 hours to reach America from Japan, it took 96 hours on average. Consequently, most of the balloons fell harmlessly into the Pacific Ocean, instead of reaching the American mainland.
