= Marcelle Tiard =

French Esperantist (1861–1932)

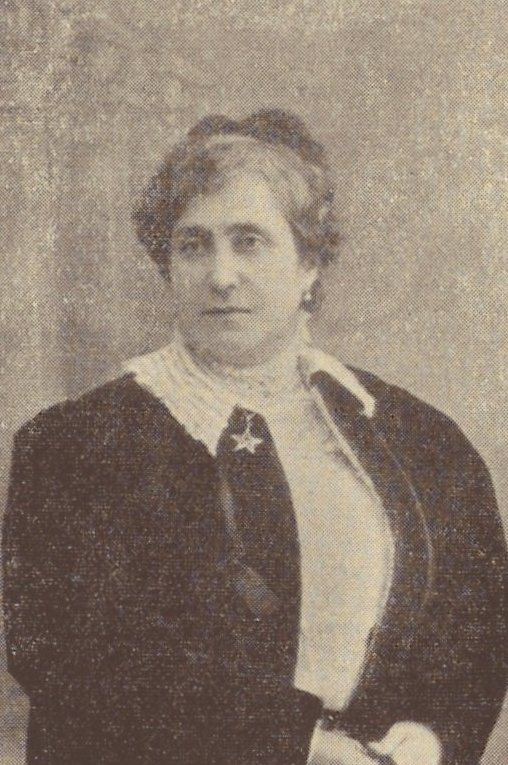
Marcelle Tiard

Marcelle Tiard (June 18, 1861 - June 1, 1932) was a French Esperantist.

== Biography ==
Marcelle Tiard was born on June 18, 1861, in Paris.

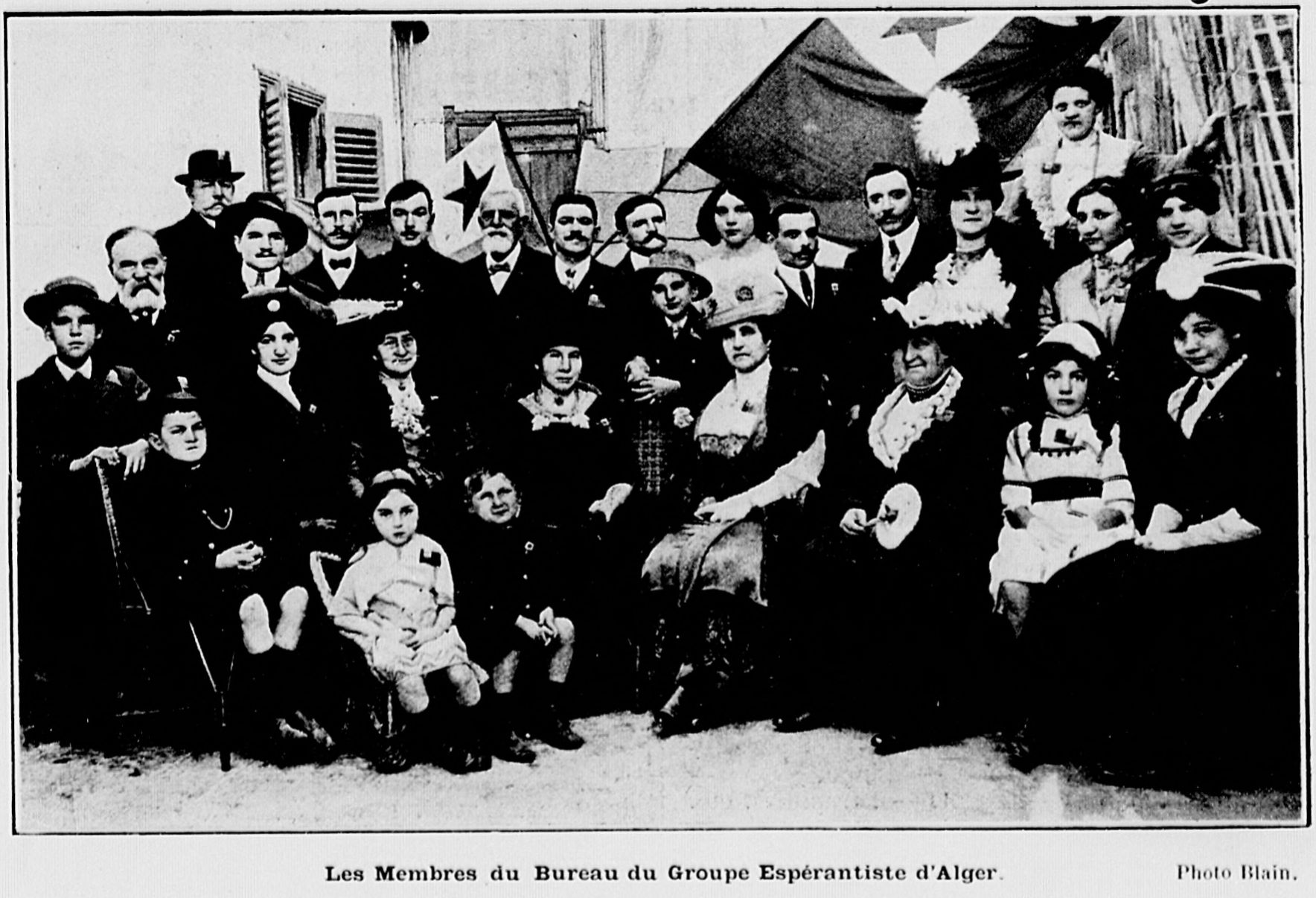
Marcelle Tiard with the Algiers group in 1913.

She learned Esperanto in 1903, before teaching it to the blind. She is known to the Adresaro de la Esperantistoj under the number 11420. Tiard presided over the Esperanto group of Nice and the Federation of Provence. She founded and presided over the Esperantist group of Algiers. In 1929, while in Budapest for the World Esperanto Congress, she co-founded the Unuiĝo de Esperantistaj Virinoj (Union of Esperantist Women) whose aim was to "sensitize women's, feminist and pacifist leagues to Esperanto". She was president of this union for some time and provided moral and financial support.

Marcelle Tiard died in Neuilly-sur-Seine, June 1, 1932.

== See also ==
- List of Esperanto speakers
