= Antoon Jozef Witteryck =

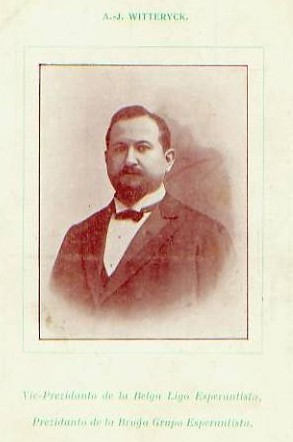
Antoon Jozef Witteryck.

Antoon Jozef Witteryck (6 June 1865 in Oostkamp – 3 July 1934 in Bruges) was a publisher and teacher from Belgium, and one of the first Esperantists in that country.

== Bibliography ==
- Het Esperanto in tien lessen. 2a eld. Brugge: A.-J. Witteryck.
- Conversations en quatre langues: English, Français, Nederlandsch, Esperanto. London 1906, 202 p.
- Zakboekje van den Nederlandschen Esperantist. Brugge: W. 1908, 31 p. 14 cm.
- Van Weyerbergh. Esperanto Gvidlibreto por turistoj en Brugo. 1910, 32 p. Redaktis W.
- De waarheid over Esperanto en Ido = La vérité sur l’Esperanto et l’Ido. S.l.: s.i. 1913, 14, 14 p. 25 cm
- Het Esperanto in tien lessen. 3a eld. Steenbrugge-bij-Brugge: De Lusthof.
- Het Esperanto in tien lessen. 6a eld. Steenbrugge: De Lusthof.
- Het Esperanto in tien lessen. Nieuwe uitg. [7a eld.] Steenbrugge-bij-Brugge: De Lusthof.
- Cours d’Esperanto. Grammaire Complète. Steenbrugge: De Lusthof. s.j., 30 p.
- L’anglais usuel en 15 leçons.
- L’anglais classique en 10 leçons.
- Lectures anglaises (suivies de notes explicatives).
- Het Engelsch voor het dagelijksch verkeer, in 15 lessen.
- Klassiek Engelsch in 10 lessen.
- Engelsche lezingen (met verklaringen) - 1ste deel.
- Engelsche lezingen (met modellen van brieven) -2de deel
- Flemish for Home Study, in 10 lessons (simple and comprehensive)
