= William Main Page =

Scottish lawyer (1869–1940)

William Main Page (8 October 1869 – 1 February 1940) was a British lawyer and Esperantist.

== Biography ==
William Page was born in London. He went to Lasswade in his youth, and worked as an analytical chemist with an oil company in the Lothians. Later, he entered the legal profession, and joined the firm of Cairns, McIntosh, & Morton. At his death he left a widow and one son, the Rev. W. H. D. Page, minister of Kirk on the Green, Leslie.

== Legal/civil work ==
- Senior partner of the firm of Cairns, McIntosh, & Morton, W.S., 31 Queen Street, Edinburgh at time of death.
- Solicitor in the Scottish High Court
- Vice-consul of Czechoslovakia in eastern Scotland.

== Religion ==
Page was a prominent layman in the Church of Scotland, and a well-known member of the General Assembly. Originally a member of the Episcopal Church, he became a Presbyterian, and was for many years connected with the Chalmers Church, West Port. In the General Assembly he was regarded as an authority on hymnology, and was secretary of the Public Worship and Aids to Devotion Committee. As a member of the join committee of the Presbyterian Churches he took an active part in the preparation of the revised Church Hymnary which was published a few years before 1940.

== Roles in Esperanto ==
Page was an Esperantist from 1905 and wrote many magazine articles on the subject of Esperanto. He was:

- Secretary of Edinburgh Esperanto Society 1906–14 and president 1914–15 and 1920–21.
- Editor of "Esperanto Monthly", 1914–19.
- Authored "Pitman's Commercial Esperanto", 1919.
- Editor of "The British Esperantist" 1920.
- Adviser of the International Central Committee in 1923–26.
- President of the World Congress in Edinburgh in 1926.
- President of the Scottish Esperanto Federation in 1927.
- Vice president of the Esperanto Association of Britain.
- Chief collaborator of the Encyclopedia of Esperanto.

(Sources, except death date: The Scotsman obituary and Encyclopedia of Esperanto)
