= Maria Angelova =

Bulgarian Esperantist and author

Maria Angelova (Bulgarian: Мария Ангелова) (1925 – 12 December 1999, Sofia) was a Bulgarian Esperantist and author.

== Works ==
- Kien ni iras) (Where we are going to), 1991.
