= People's Olympiad =

Planned multi-sport event in Barcelona in 1936

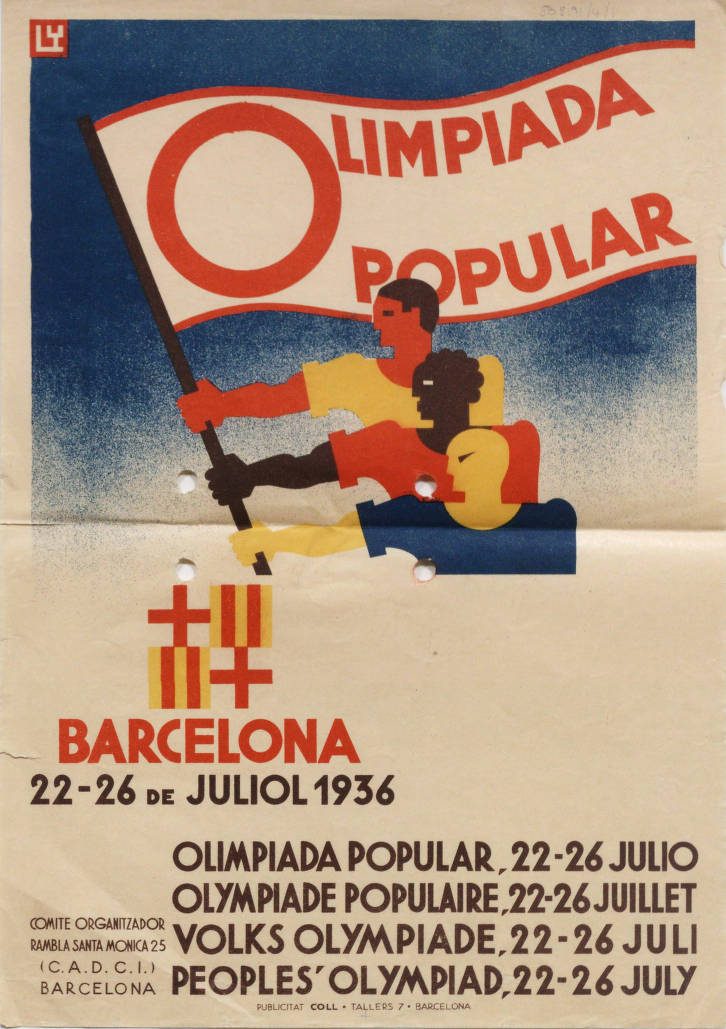
- Poster for the People's Olympiad
- Purpose: Alternative sporting event to protest against the 1936 Summer Olympics being held in Berlin under Nazi rule.
- Opened by: Games cancelled before inauguration. Planned: President Lluís Companys
- Headquarters: Barcelona, Catalonia (Spain)

The People's Olympiad (Catalan: Olimpíada Popular, Spanish: Olimpiada Popular) was a planned international multi-sport event that was intended to take place in 1936 in Barcelona, Catalonia, Spanish Republic. It was conceived as an anti-fascist protest event against the 1936 Summer Olympics being held in Berlin, which was then under control of the Nazi Party.

Despite gaining support from some athletes, and most significantly the Soviet Union and the Communist International organization, the People's Olympiad was never held, as a result of the outbreak of the Spanish Civil War. Fifty-six years later, Barcelona hosted the 1992 Summer Olympics.

The People's Olympiad was the first ever global attempt to boycott a modern Olympics.

== Background ==
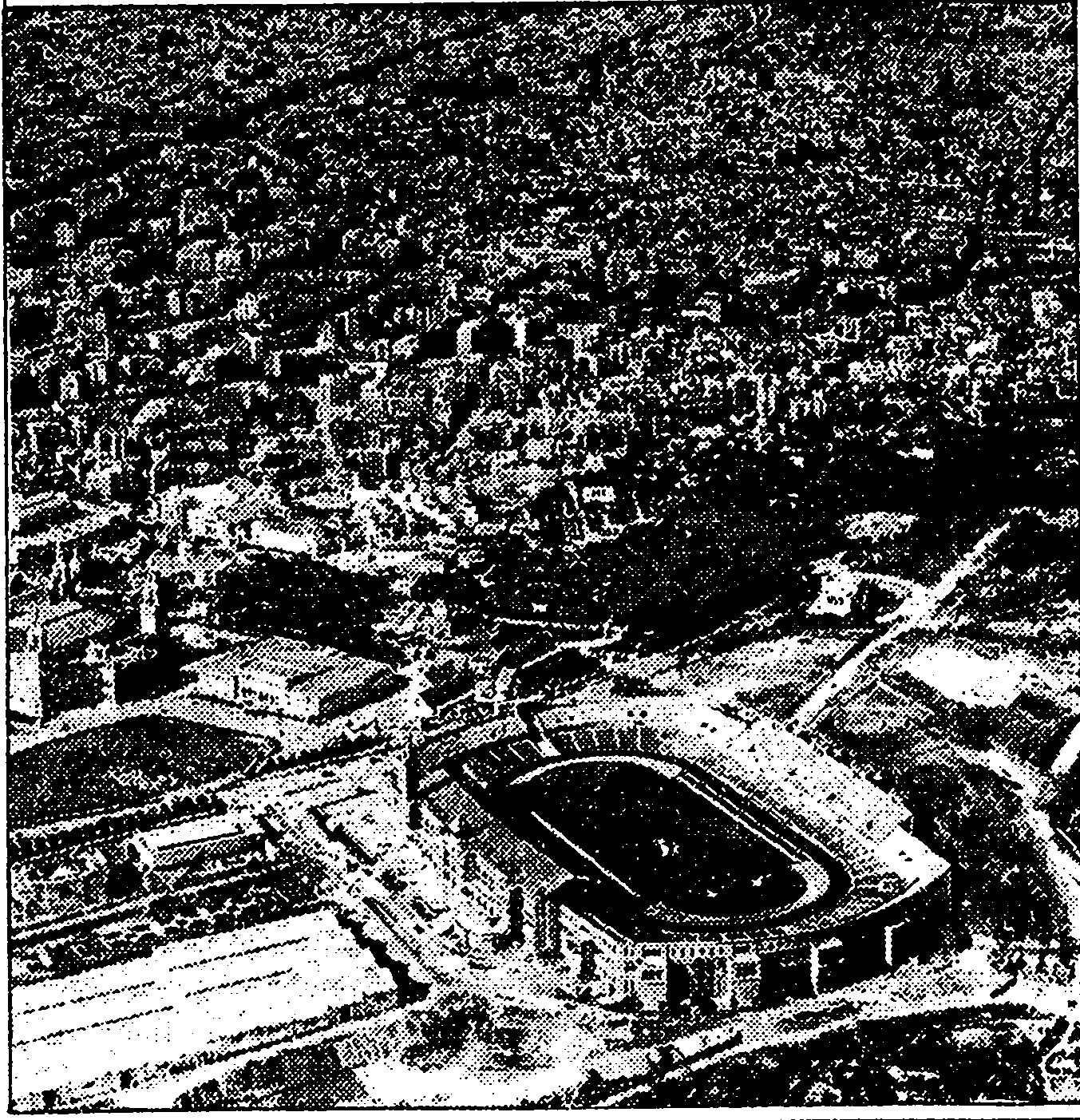
The Estadi Olímpic de Montjuïc in Barcelona was intended to be the main stadium for the People's Olympiad. Visible in the foreground of this 1929 photograph.

In 1931, the International Olympic Committee had selected Berlin, then the capital of the democratic Weimar Republic, to host the 1936 Summer Olympics at the 29th IOC Session in Barcelona. Berlin had defeated Barcelona, which was also vying to host the Games, by 43 votes to 16. During the same year, King Alfonso XIII went into exile, Spain adopted a republican constitution and Catalonia was recognized as an autonomous region within the Spanish Republic after a brief proclamation of a Catalan Republic.

Following the 1936 general election in Spain, the Pro-People's Sports Committee of Catalonia (Catalan: Comitè Català pro-Esport Popular, CCPEP), supported by the Government of Catalonia, as well as by the newly elected Spanish Popular Front government, advocated for the boycott of Spain to the Berlin Olympics in Nazi Germany and the organization of an alternative games in Barcelona. Invitations were made to many countries, and it was planned to use the hotels built for the 1929 Barcelona International Exposition as an Olympic-style Village. The games were scheduled to be held from July 19 to 26 and would have therefore ended six days prior to the start of the Berlin games. In addition to the usual sporting events, the Barcelona games would also have featured chess, folkdancing, music and theatre.

== Participants ==
A total of 6,000 athletes from 49 nations registered for the games. The largest contingents of athletes came from the United States, the United Kingdom, the Netherlands, Belgium, Czechoslovakia, Denmark, Norway, Sweden and French Algeria. There were also teams from Germany and Italy made up of political exiles from those countries. Teams representing Jewish exiles, Alsace, Catalonia (the host), Galicia, and the Basque Country also registered. The Soviet Union, under the rule of Joseph Stalin, had been holding its own version of the Olympics, known as the Spartakiad, organised by Red Sport International. Despite this, the Soviets agreed to attend the Barcelona competition.

Many of the athletes were sent by trade unions, workers' clubs and associations, socialist and communist parties, and left-wing groups, rather than by state-sponsored committees.

=== Nations expected to participate ===
Participating national teams
- Algeria
- Alsace
- Belgium
- Canada
- Catalonia (host)
- Czechoslovakia
- Denmark
- Euskadi
- Galicia
- France (1200)
- French Morocco
- Great Britain
- Greece
- Hungary
- Ireland
- Netherlands
- Norway
- Mandatory Palestine
- Portugal
- Rif
- Soviet Union
- Spain
- Sweden
- Switzerland
- United States

=== Exile teams ===
- (Germany) Germans
- (Italy) Italians
- Jews

== Opening ceremony, lodging and competition ==
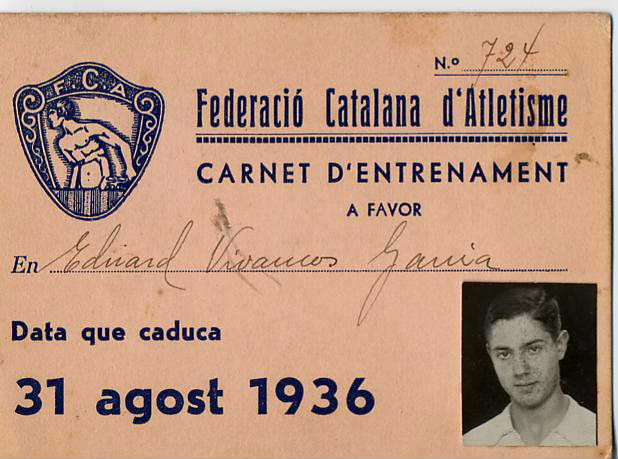
Catalan runner Eduard Vivancos accreditation card for the People's Olympiad

The proposed opening ceremony of the Olympiad included the parades of exiled Jews from Europe, as well as of people from North Africa under colonization, representing states and stateless nations. A song composed by Hanns Eisler, an exiled left-wing German Jew whose lyrics would be written by Josep Maria de Sagarra, a Catalan poet, would play in the background of the ceremony. Women would be allowed to compete in more events than the International Olympic Committee did at the time, in Berlin. It was planned that the President of Catalonia, Lluís Companys, would open the games, as the heads of state do with the Olympics.

There was no Olympic Village-like complex available because the committee lacked the time to build one, having only three months planning time. As a result, athletes first had to stay in hotels and hostels, and then the reassigned Hotel Olympic. Higher than expected numbers of visitors arriving for the games forced the Catalan government to try to find more lodging for athletes in a rush.

With the outbreak of the Spanish Civil War just as the games were to begin, the games were hastily cancelled. Some athletes never made it to Barcelona, as the borders had been closed, while many who were in the city for the beginning of the games made a hasty exit. However, at least 200 of the athletes, such as Clara Thalmann, remained in Spain, and joined workers' militias that were organized to defend the Second Spanish Republic against the Nationalists.

== See also ==
- Wide is the Gate – an Upton Sinclair novel starting in Barcelona
- International Workers' Olympiads
- Spartakiad
- Games of the New Emerging Forces
- Liberty Bell Classic
- Friendship Games
- Goodwill Games
- 1992 Summer Olympics
