= Don Harlow =

Esperantist and former president of Esperanto-USA (1942–2008)

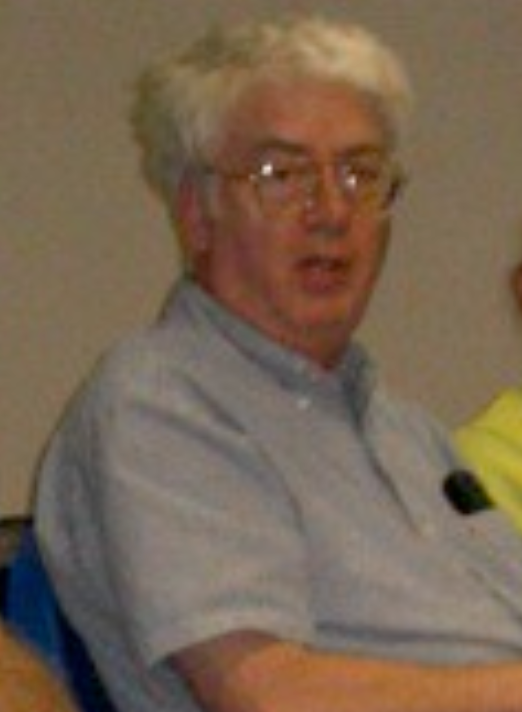
Harlow in 2005

Donald Harlow (July 8, 1942 – January 27, 2008) was an active Esperantist and former president of Esperanto-USA (E-USA, formerly Esperanto League for North America or ELNA), and also former editor of ELNA's magazine Esperanto USA. He authored a self-published book on the Esperanto movement, The Esperanto Book, which is available online. He also created the websites Esperanto Access (Esperanto pages for English speakers) and Literaturo en Esperanto, an extensive index of online Esperanto literature.

In 2007, the annual ELNA translation contest was renamed in his honor the Harlow Prize (or Premio Harlow). It was established to celebrate and promote the translation of American literature into Esperanto.
