= Anna Tuschinski =

Esperantist (1841–1939)

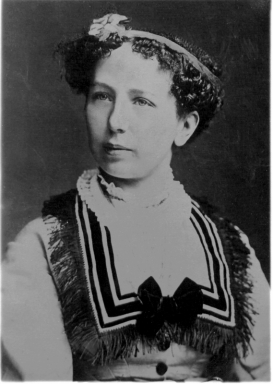
- Tuschinski in 1870
- Born: Anna Elisa Lorwein; 4 December 1841; Danzig, Kingdom of Prussia (now Gdańsk, Poland)
- Died: 9 October 1939 (aged 97); Danzig, Reichsgau West Prussia, Nazi Germany
- Occupation: Teacher
- Known for: Esperanto
- Spouse: Karol Tuschinski (died 1890)
- Children: 1

Anna Elisa Tuschinski (née Lorwein; 4 December 1841 – 9 October 1939) was an Esperantist from the city of Danzig. Trained as a teacher, she learned Esperanto in 1907 and began spreading the language throughout the city. Tuschinski was well-regarded in the international Esperanto movement, and is referred to as the "Mother of Esperanto".

== Biography ==
Anna Elisa Lorwein was born on 4 December 1841 in the city of Danzig (now Gdańsk), then part of the Kingdom of Prussia. Her father was a German merchant named Gustav Lorwein, while her mother was a Pole named Adela Juchnowicz. Little is recorded about her early life, though it is known that she worked as a teacher and married merchant Karol Tuschinski, having a daughter with him. Her husband died around 1890. Though she was raised in an Evangelical family, Tuschinski attended both Catholic and Jewish church services, and in her later life became aligned with the Baháʼí Faith. She was described by contemporary Martha Root as being "not tall, silent, awe-inspiring; rather she is very petite, slender, always smiling, richly blessed with the gift of humor, and so light is her step that she still dances with the young men at the Esperanto balls and informal parties".

In 1907, Tuschinski found a grammar pamphlet for Esperanto, a recently constructed international auxiliary language, and she was captivated with how "logical" the language seemed. The 66-year-old Tuschinski quickly learned the language and began teaching it in Danzig, founding the Gdańsk Esperanto Association in November 1907. The following year, she attended the 4th World Esperanto Congress in Dresden, where she met and danced with L. L. Zamenhof, the creator of Esperanto. Over the following years, Tuschinski spread the language throughout Danzig, and the GDA had grown to over 100 members by 1910. Due to her efforts, Danzig hosted of the 7th All-German Esperanto Congress in 1912, and she became referred to as the "Mother of Esperanto".

Despite World War I slowing her ability to spread Esperanto, the establishment of the Free City of Danzig after the war led to the further expansion of the language in the city; by 1920, there were six Esperanto classes in Danzig, with a total of around 130 students. In 1922, Tuschinski founded the Gdańsk Esperanto Congress in cooperation with the World Esperanto Association, and five years later, the city hosted the 19th World Esperanto Congress. Tuschinski, then age 86, served as the honorary president of the congress and gave the opening speech. She continued advocating for Esperanto until her death in Nazi-occupied Danzig on 9 October 1939, aged 98.

Tuschinski's life is featured in an episode of the 2023 documentary film Wrzeszczanki, produced by the Palma Foundation and showcasing four prominent women of the Wrzeszcz neighborhood of Gdańsk.
