= Fran Novljan =

Croatian educator, andragogue, and Esperantist

- Born: August 7, 1879
- Died: January 12, 1977 (aged 97)
- Occupations: Educator; Andragogue; Esperantist

Franjo (Fran) Novljan (7 August 1879 – 12 January 1977) was a Croatian educator, andragogue, and Esperantist.

== Biography ==
Novljan was born in Novljani, Boljunsko Polje, Istria (now Croatia, at the time Austria-Hungary). He went to classical grammar school in Sušak. There he founded the student society Nova nada. He studied mathematics and physics in Vienna. In 1901, during his studies, he founded with I. Ivančić the Istrian Committee of the Croatian Academic Society Zvonimir. He was drafted into the Austro-Hungarian army, and later became a teacher of mathematics and physics at Pazin Private Women's Teacher Training College and at the Croatian Gymnasium of Pazin. On his initiative, a kind of public college was established in Pazin in 1907. He gave public lectures at the Narodni dom, collaborated with the Academic Society "Istra", and worked in the Pazin Student Support Society. Returning from the army in 1918, he became involved in politics and diplomacy. participating in the establishment of the National Council of Slovenes, Croats and Serbs, of which he was a commissioner in Zagreb and Prague. He was member of the delegation to the Paris Peace Conference in 1919. He was given the task by the National Council of organizing the reception and accommodation of refugees from Istria. From 1920 he taught in Zagreb, then in Bjelovar, then in Nova Gradiška. In 1920 he became the editor of the Zagreb newspaper Radiša. In 1934 he gave impetus to the activities of the People's University in Nova Gradiška. In the same year, he became the editor of Novi Grad's Sadašnost. In 1939 he became the principal of a grammar school in Zagreb. The NDH sent him into retirement him in 1941.

He was a prominent member and commissioner of Matica hrvatska for Istria.

Novljan was an active Esperantist. He was among the founders of the Prosvjetnoga saveza (Educational Alliance), of which he was first secretary. He organized Esperanto institutions in Zagreb. Novljan collaborated with Esperanto newspapers and magazines. He was the author of the Esperanto textbook Internacia lingvo esperanto i Esperanto en tridek lecionoj.

Novljan had been collecting, writing and describing ethnographic material in and about the Boljun region since he was young. This effort resulted in the work Boljun, kmiečki život i už (a) nci. He wrote the work Gospodarstvo, prosvjeta, politika with Josip Predavec and Stjepan Radić, and published it in Zagreb in 1907.

He died in Zagreb.
