= Georges Lagrange =

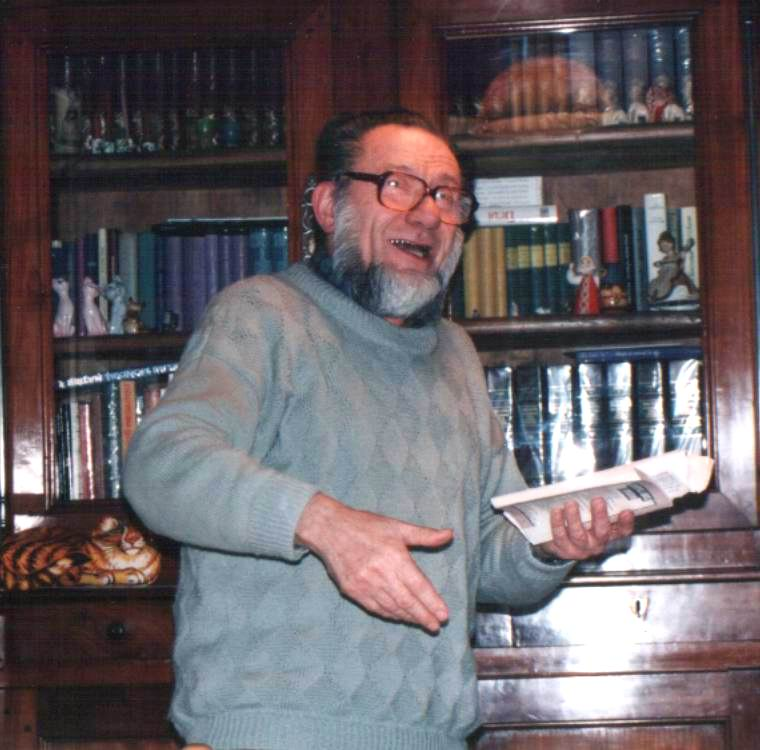
Georges Lagrange at the conference

Georges Lagrange (French pronunciation: [ʒɔʁʒ la.ɡʁɑ̃ʒ]; August 31, 1928 in Gagny, Seine-Saint-Denis – April 30, 2004 in Poitiers) was a French Esperantist writer and member of the Academy of Esperanto. He translated several theater pieces from French to Esperanto, acted in some of them, and wrote poems and detective novels under the pseudonym Serĝo Elgo.

== Some translations ==
- Andromaka, and Fedra, Jean Racine
- Hernani, Victor Hugo,
- Justuloj, Albert Camus
- Fatomaŝino, Jean Cocteau
- La kalva Kantistino, Eugène Ionesco
