= Josip Predavec =

Croatian politician (1884–1933)

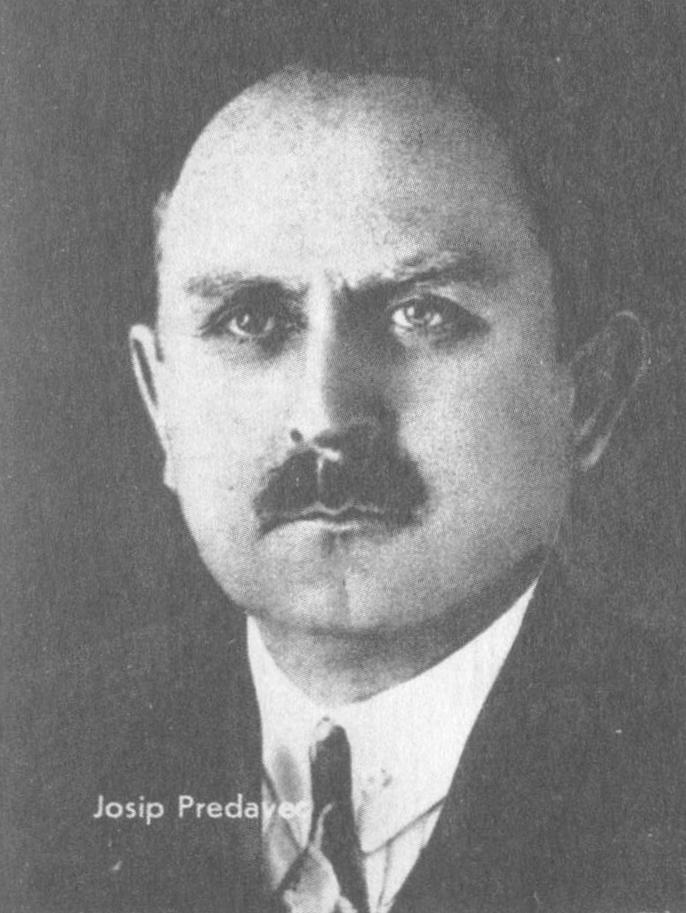
Josip Predavec

Josip Predavec (1 July 1884 in Rugvica – 14 July 1933 in Dugo Selo) was a Croatian politician, vice-president of the Croatian Peasant Party, who was murdered in 1933.

In 1929 Predavec was serving as vice-president of the Croatian Peasant Party. On January 6, King Alexander proclaimed a royal dictatorship which banned the activities of political parties such as the Peasant. Soon after, Predavec was put on a show trial for the bankruptcy of the Peasant Collective Bank. At the trial he was defended by Mile Budak. Predavec was found guilty and sentenced to two and a half years in jail.

He had been released by the time of the meeting of the Peasant-Democrat Coalition meeting held from 5 to 7 November 1932 during which the Zagreb Points was passed, the joint statement by the Croatian Peasant Party and the Independent Democratic Party laying out their opposition to the Royal Dictatorship.

Predavec wrote the book Gospodarstvo, prosvjeta, politika with Fran Novljan and Stjepan Radić, which was published by Novljan in Zagreb in 1907.

== Death ==
He was killed at his estate in Dugo Selo by Tomo Koščec, who claimed to be acting from personal reasons, on July 14, 1933. His body was interred at the Croatian Peasant Party's arcade in Mirogoj Cemetery, where the remains of representatives assassinated in the National Assembly lie (Stjepan Radić, Pavle Radić and Đuro Basariček).
