= Nadija Hordijenko Andrianova =

Ukrainian writer and translator of Esperanto

- Надія Гордієнко-Андріанова
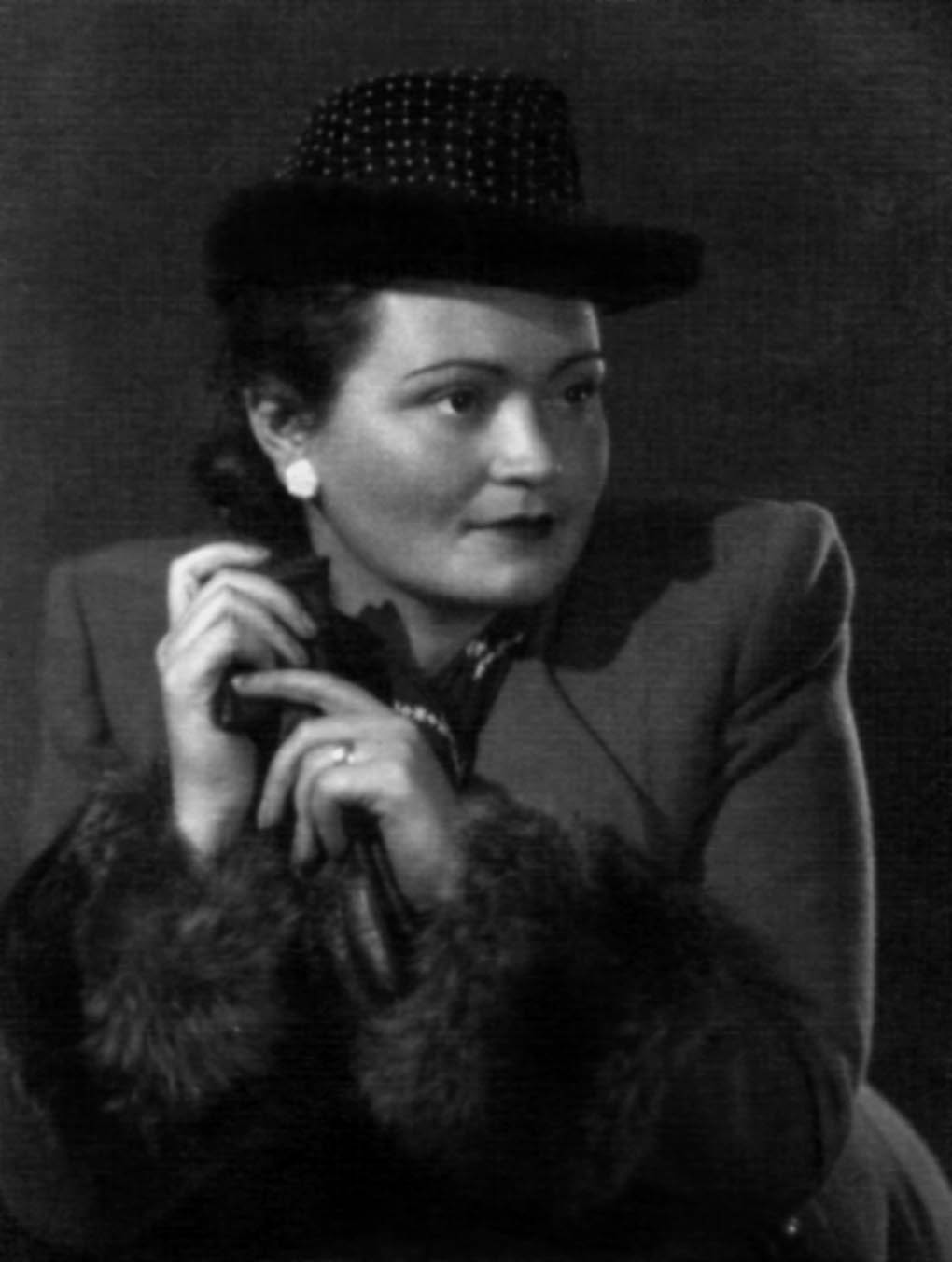
- Hordijenko Andrianova, late 1940s
- Born: Nadija Mykolajivna Andrianova; 15 December 1921; Vasylkiv, Ukrainian SSR, Soviet Union
- Died: 27 March 1998 (aged 76); Kyiv, Ukraine
- Education: Taras Shevchenko National University of Kyiv (1945)
- Occupations: Writer; translator; Esperantist; literary critic
- Writing career
- Language: Esperanto; Ukrainian
- Notable awards: International Literary Competition (1986)

Nadija Mykolajivna Hordijenko Andrianova (Ukrainian: Надія Миколаївна Гордієнко-Андріанова [nɐˈd⁽ʲ⁾ijɐ mɪkoˈlɑjiu̯nɐ ɦord⁽ʲ⁾iˈjɛnko ɐnd⁽ʲ⁾r⁽ʲ⁾iˈɑnowɐ]; also Andrianova Hordijenko; 15 December 1921 – 27 March 1998) was a Ukrainian writer and translator of the Esperanto language.

She graduated in literature and journalism at Kyiv University in 1945, and studied foreign languages until 1950. She wrote as a literary critic and translator for a number of journals, including Radianskyi selianin (1945–46), Paco and Hungara Vivo. Between 1946–62, she was the editor of the State Literary Publishing House of Ukraine (now Dnipro Publishers). She was also active as a popularizer of the Esperanto language, founding the Esperanto Commission at the Council for Friendship and Cultural Relations with Foreign Countries (1968–73), whose bulletin Tra la Soveta Ukrainio she was chief editor for. Since 1957, she was a member of the Ukrainian Literary Union.

As a translator from Esperanto, Russian, German, English, Bulgarian and French to Ukrainian, she adapted works by authors of the likes of Vikenty Veresaev, Vladimir Korolenko, Alexander Herzen, Aleksandr I. Kuprin, Alexander Ostrovsky, Konstantin Fedin, Wolfgang Schreyer, Manfred Gregor, Helen Keller, Vasili Eroshenko, Bruno Apitz, Henri Barbusse, the Brothers Grimm, Alphonse Daudet, Victor Hugo, Theodore Dreiser, Maurice Maeterlinck, Guy de Maupassant, Ludwig Renn, Bertolt Brecht, Anatole France and Stefan Zweig, among others. She also translated to Esperanto works by the following authors of Ukrainian literature: Taras Shevchenko, Ivan Franko, Lesya Ukrainka, Maksym Rylsky, Oles Honchar, Ivan Drach and Yevhen Hutsalo.

In 1987, the Hungarian Esperanto Association published her autobiography Vagante tra la mondo maltrankvila.

== Awards ==
In 1986, she won a prize at the International Literary Competition in Vittoria, Italy.

== Selected works ==
=== Publications ===
- "Monumentoj de l'eterna amikeco; Renkonto kun Baba Paraŝkeva; Disiĝo kun Rodopoj; Glorkanto al Jambol; Glorkanto al Esperanto". Bukedo (in Esperanto): 64–74.
- Vagante tra la mondo maltrankvila (in Esperanto). Budapest: Hungarian Esperanto Association. 1987. ISBN 963-571-182-4.

=== Translations ===
- Ukrainaj popolaj fabeloj (in Esperanto). Sofia: BEA. 1983.
- Ukrainka, Lesja (1971). Liriko (in Esperanto). Kyiv: Ukrainian Esperanto Commission at the Council for Friendship and Cultural Relations with Foreign Countries.
