= Logocracy =

Form of government by use of words

Logocracy is the rule of, or government by, words. It is derived from the Greek λόγος (logos)—"word" and from κράτος (kratos)—to "govern". The term can be used either positively, ironically, or negatively.

== Historical examples ==
The United States is described as a logocracy in Washington Irving's 1807 work Salmagundi. A visiting foreigner, "Mustapha Rub-a-dub Keli Khan", describes it as such, by which he means that via the tricky use of words, one can have power over others. Those most adept at this are termed "slang-whangers", while Congress is a "blustering, windy assembly". Mustapha describes how:

"unknown to these people themselves, their government is a pure unadulterated LOGOCRACY or government of words. The whole nation does every thing viva voce, or, by word of mouth, and in this manner is one of the most military nations in existence [...] In a logocracy thou well knowest there is little or no occasion for fire arms, or any such destructive weapons. Every offensive or defensive measure is enforced by wordy battle, and paper war; he who has the longest tongue or readiest quill, is sure to gain the victory—will carry horror, abuse, and ink shed into the very trenches of the enemy, and without mercy or remorse, put men, women, and children to the point of the—pen!"

The Soviet Union was described by Nobel Prize winner Czesław Miłosz as a logocracy. It was for example, according to Christine D. Tomei, a "pseudo-reality created by mere words". Moreover, after the revolution Luciano Pellicani describes how a "language reform plan" was introduced by Kisselev. In it he "stressed that the old mentality would never be overthrown, if the structure of the Russian language was not also transformed and purged."

This process led to a Soviet language that George Orwell would later dub "neo-language", and was a precursor to his Nineteen Eighty-Four Newspeak. The new Soviet 'language' was less a real language than an 'orthogloxy', a "stereotyped jargon consisting of formulas and empty slogans, whose purpose was to prevent people from thinking outside the boundaries of collective thought"—i.e. it was speech which destroyed individuality. Janina Frentzel-Zagórska, however, queries the importance of political language in the USSR, saying that "the old ideological 'Newspeak' had completely disappeared in the Soviet Union long before" the fall of Communism.

Totalitarianism, according to political theorist Hannah Arendt, can be considered a logocracy, since in it ideas are no longer important, just how they are expressed.

Academic Yahya Michot has referred to Sunni Islam as a "popular" or "laic logocracy", in that it is government by the word of the Koran.

== See also ==
- Linguistic relativity
- Political correctness
