= Magda Šaturová =

Slovak esperantist

- Born: 4 July 1929; Bratislava, Czechoslovakia
- Died: 10 September 2016 (aged 87)
- Occupation: Translator

Magda Šaturová-Seppová (4 July 1929 – 10 September 2016) was a Slovak Esperantist and translator, who translated several Slovak books to Esperanto and authored multiple Esperanto-Slovak dictionaries. In 2004, at the 89th World Esperanto Congress in Beijing, she was elected an Honorary Member of the Universal Esperanto Association. She also translated books from Esperanto, English and Hungarian to Slovak.

Šaturová studied English literature at the Comenius University, graduating in 1952. She was fluent in Slovak, Hungarian, German, English, French and, of course, Esperanto. She was married to a fellow esperantist František Šatura. They had three children.
