= Newspeak =

Fictional language in the novel "Nineteen Eighty-Four"

In the 1949 dystopian novel Nineteen Eighty-Four (also published as 1984), by George Orwell, Newspeak is the fictional language of Oceania, a totalitarian superstate. To meet the ideological requirements of Ingsoc (English Socialism) in Oceania, the Party created Newspeak, a controlled language of simplified grammar and restricted vocabulary designed to prevent people from being able to think critically. The Newspeak language thus limits the person's ability to articulate and communicate abstract concepts, such as personal identity, self-expression, and free will, which are thoughtcrimes, acts of personal independence that contradict the ideological orthodoxy of Ingsoc collectivism.

In the appendix to the novel, "The Principles of Newspeak", Orwell explains that Newspeak follows most rules of English grammar, yet is a language characterised by a continually diminishing vocabulary; complete thoughts are reduced to simple terms of simplistic meaning. The political contractions of Newspeak – Ingsoc (English Socialism), Minitrue (Ministry of Truth), Miniplenty (Ministry of Plenty) – are similar to Nazi and Soviet contractions in the 20th century, such as Gestapo (Geheime Staatspolizei), politburo (Political Bureau of the Central Committee of the Communist Party of the Soviet Union), Comintern (Communist International), kolkhoz (collective farm), and Komsomol (communist youth union). Newspeak contractions usually are syllabic abbreviations meant to conceal the speaker's ideology from the speaker and the listener.

== Development of Newspeak ==
As a constructed language, Newspeak is a language of planned phonology, limited grammar, and finite vocabulary, much like the phonology, grammar, and vocabulary of Basic English (British American Scientific International Commercial English), which was proposed by the British linguist Charles Kay Ogden in 1930. As a controlled language without complex constructions or ambiguous usages, Basic English was designed to be easy to learn, to sound, and to speak, with a vocabulary of 850 words composed specifically to facilitate the communication of facts, not the communication of abstract thought. While employed as a propagandist by BBC during the Second World War (1939–1945), Orwell grew to believe that the constructions of Basic English, as a controlled language, imposed functional limitations upon the speech, the writing, and the thinking of the users.

When Orwell visited his aunt Ellen Kate Limouzin and her husband Eugène Lanti in Paris, the couple conversed in the constructed international auxiliary language of Esperanto at home as Lanti refused to speak French. Orwell suffered as a non-speaker of Esperanto and developed a strong dislike for the language, which some scholars have suggested as influential in the development of Newspeak.

In the essay "Politics and the English Language" (1946) and in "The Principles of Newspeak" appendix to Nineteen Eighty-Four (1949), Orwell discusses the communication function of English and contemporary ideological changes in usage during the 1940s. In the novel, the linguistic decadence of English is the central theme about language-as-communication.In the essay, Standard English was characterised by dying metaphors, pretentious diction, and high-flown rhetoric. Orwell concludes: "I said earlier that the decadence of our language is probably curable. Those who deny this [decadence] may argue that language merely reflects existing social conditions, and that we cannot influence its development, by any direct tinkering with words or constructions."

Orwell argued that the decline of English went hand-in-hand with the decline of intellectualism among society, and thus facilitated the manipulation of listeners and speakers and writers into consequent political chaos. The story of Nineteen Eighty-Four portrays the connection between authoritarian regimes and doublespeak language, earlier discussed in "Politics and the English Language":

When the general atmosphere is bad, language must suffer. I should expect to find – this is a guess, which I have not sufficient knowledge to verify – that the German, Russian and Italian languages have all deteriorated in the last ten or fifteen years, as a result of dictatorship. But if thought corrupts language, language can also corrupt thought.

In contemporary political usage, the term Newspeak is used to impugn an opponent who introduces new definitions of words to push a political agenda.

== Principles ==
To eliminate the expression of ambiguity and nuance from Oldspeak (Standard English) in order to reduce the English language's communication functions, Newspeak uses simplistic constructions of language, such as the dichotomies of pleasure vs. pain and happiness vs. sadness. Such dichotomies produced the linguistic and political concepts of goodthink and crimethink that reinforce the totalitarianism of The Party over the people of Oceania. The long-term goal of The Party is that, by 2050, Newspeak would be the universal language of every member of The Party and of Oceanian society, except for the Proles, the working class of Oceania.

In Newspeak, English root-words function both as nouns and as verbs, which reduces the vocabulary available for the speaker to communicate meaning; e.g. as a noun and as a verb, the word think eliminates the word thought to functionally communicate thoughts, which are the products of intellectualism. As a form of personal communication, Newspeak is spoken in staccato rhythm, using short words that are easy to pronounce, so that speech is physically automatic and intellectually unconscious, by which mental habits the user of Newspeak avoids critical thinking. English words of comparative and superlative meanings and irregular spellings were simplified; thus, better becomes gooder and best becomes goodest. The Newspeak prefixes plus- and doubleplus- are used for emphasis, e.g. pluscold means "very cold" and doublepluscold means "extremely cold". Newspeak forms adjectives by appending the suffix -ful to a root-word, e.g. goodthinkful means "orthodox in thought"; whilst adverbs are formed by adding the suffix -wise, e.g. goodthinkwise means "in an orthodox manner".

=== Thought control ===
The intellectual purpose of Newspeak is to make all anti-Ingsoc thoughts "literally unthinkable" as speech. As constructed, Newspeak vocabulary communicates the exact expression of sense and meaning that a member of the Party could wish to express, while excluding secondary denotations and connotations, eliminating the ways of lateral thinking (indirect thinking), which allow a word to have additional meanings. The linguistic simplification of Oldspeak into Newspeak was realised with neologisms, the elimination of ideologically undesirable words, and the elimination of the politically unorthodox meanings of words.

The word free still existed in Newspeak, but only to communicate the absence of something, e.g. "The dog is free from lice" or "This field is free of weeds". The word could not denote free will, because intellectual freedom was no longer supposed to exist in Oceania. The limitations of Newspeak's vocabulary enabled the Party to effectively control the population's minds, by allowing the user only a very narrow range of spoken and written thought; hence, words such as: crimethink (thought crime), doublethink (accepting contradictory beliefs), and Ingsoc communicated only their surface meanings.

In the story of Nineteen Eighty-Four, the lexicologist character Syme discusses his editorial work on the latest edition of the Newspeak Dictionary:

By 2050—earlier, probably—all real knowledge of Oldspeak will have disappeared. The whole literature of the past will have been destroyed. Chaucer, Shakespeare, Milton, Byron—they'll exist only in Newspeak versions, not merely changed into something different, but actually contradictory of what they used to be. Even the literature of The Party will change. Even the slogans will change. How could you have a slogan like Freedom is Slavery when the concept of freedom has been abolished? The whole climate of thought will be different. In fact, there will be no thought, as we understand it now. Orthodoxy means not thinking—not needing to think. Orthodoxy is unconsciousness.

=== Vocabulary ===
Newspeak words are classified by three distinct classes: the A, B, and C vocabularies.

The words of the A vocabulary describe the functional concepts of daily life (e.g. eating and drinking, working and cooking). It consists mostly of English words, but they are very small in number compared to English, and each word's meanings are "far more rigidly defined" than in English.

The words of the B vocabulary are deliberately constructed for political purposes to convey complex ideas in a simple form. They are compound words and noun-verbs with political significance that are meant to impose and instill in Oceania's citizens the correct mental attitudes required by the Party. In the appendix, Orwell explains that the very structure of the B vocabulary (the fact that they are compound words) carries ideological weight. The large number of contractions in the B vocabulary – for example, the Ministry of Truth being called Minitrue, the Records Department being called Recdep, the Fiction Department being called Ficdep, the Teleprogrammes Department being called Teledep – is not done simply to save time. As with examples of compound words in the political language of the 20th century – Nazi, Gestapo, Politburo, Comintern, Inprecor, Agitprop, and many others – Orwell remarks that the Party believed that abbreviating a name could "narrowly and subtly" alter a word's meaning. Newspeak is supposed to make this effort a conscious purpose:

[...]Comintern is a word that can be uttered almost without taking thought, whereas Communist International is a phrase over which one is obliged to linger at least momentarily. In the same way, the associations called up by a word like Minitrue are fewer and more controllable than those called up by Ministry of Truth. This accounted not only for the habit of abbreviating whenever possible, but also for the almost exaggerated care that was taken to make every word easily pronounceable.

The B words in Newspeak are supposed to sound pleasant, while also being easily pronounceable, in an attempt to make speech on anything political "staccato and monotonous" and, ultimately, mask from the speaker all ideological content.

The words of the C vocabulary are scientific and technical terms that supplement the linguistic functions of the A and B vocabularies. These words are the same scientific terms in English, but many of them have had their meanings rigidified to attempt, as with the A vocabulary, to prevent speakers from being able to express anti-government thoughts. Distribution of the C vocabulary is limited, because the Party does not want citizens to know more than a select few ways of life or techniques of production. Hence, the Oldspeak word science has no equivalent term in Newspeak; instead, these words are simply treated as specific technical words for speaking of technical fields.

== Grammar ==
Newspeak's grammar is greatly simplifed compared to English. It also has two "outstanding" characteristics: almost completely interchangeable linguistic functions between the parts of speech (any word can function as a verb, noun, adjective, or adverb), and heavy inflectional regularity in the construction of usages and of words. Inflectional regularity means that most irregular words are replaced with regular words combined with prefixes and suffixes. For example, the preterite and the past participle constructions of verbs are alike, with both ending in –ed. Hence, the Newspeak preterite of the English word steal is stealed, and that of the word think is thinked. Likewise, the past participles of swim, give, bring, speak, and take were, respectively swimmed, gived, bringed, speaked, and taked, with all irregular forms (swam, gave, brought, spoke, and took) being eliminated. The auxiliaries (including to be), pronouns, demonstratives, and relatives still inflect irregularly. They mostly follow their use in English, but the tenses are dropped for the words whom, shall, and should; whom being replaced by who, and shall and should by will and would.

=== Prefixes ===
- "Un-" is used to indicate negation, as Newspeak has no non-political antonyms. For example, the Standard English words warm and hot are replaced by uncold, and the moral concept communicated with the word bad is expressed as ungood. When prepended to a verb, the prefix "un-" communicates a negative imperative mood; thus, the Newspeak word unproceed means "do not proceed" in Standard English. In the case of unperson, the 'un' indicates that the person (officially) never existed (or, in other words, never was a person).
- "Plus-" is an intensifier that replaces very and more; thus, plusgood replaces very good and English words such as great.
- "Doubleplus-" is an intensifier that replaces extremely and superlatives; for example, doubleplusgood replaces words such as fantastic and excellent.
- "Ante-" is the prefix that replaces before; thus antefiling replaces the English phrase "before filing".
- "Post-" is the prefix that replaces after.
- "Up-" and "down-" are prefixes which relate to things above or below a frame of reference. This may be literal, or it could be figurative, such as in the case of upsub (submitting (a thing, usually) to a higher authority).
- "Good-" and "Crime-" are prefixes which relate to ideological correctness; compare goodthink (ideologically correct thought) and crimethink (any anti-Ingsoc thoughts).
- "Old-" indicates a (usually derogatory) reference to the times before Ingsoc; such as oldspeak (pre-newspeak Standard English) or oldthink (ideals since abolished by the Party).
- "Mal-" indicates (treasonous) inaccuracy (according to the Party); for example, any old quotes or reports which contradict the current truth expressed by the party are considered malquotes and malreports.

=== Suffixes ===
In spoken and written Newspeak, suffixes are also used in the elimination of irregular conjugations:

- "-ful" transforms any word into an adjective, e.g. the English words fast, quick, and rapid are replaced by speedful and words such as slow and melancholy are replaced by unspeedful. Goodthink is transformed to goodthinkful.
- "-d" and "-ed" form the past tense of a verb, e.g. ran becomes runned, stole becomes stealed, drove becomes drived, thought becomes thinked, drank becomes drinked, and goodthink is transformed to goodthinked.
- "-ing" forms the present participle of a verb, e.g. goodthinking (actively practising goodthink).
- "-er" forms the more comparison of an adjective, e.g. better becomes gooder.
  - "-er" also forms the verbal noun, e.g. goodthinker (one whom practices goodthink)
- "-est" forms the most comparison of an adjective, e.g. best becomes goodest.
- "-s" and "-es" transform a noun into its plural form, e.g. men becomes mans, oxen becomes oxes, and lives becomes lifes.
- "-wise" transforms any word into an adverb by eliminating all English adverbs not already ending in "-wise", e.g. quickly becomes speedwise, slowly becomes unspeedwise, carefully becomes carewise, goodthink is transformed to goodthinkwise, and words like fully, completely, and totally become fullwise.

Therefore, the Oldspeak sentence, "He ran extremely quickly," would become, "He runned doubleplusspeedwise."

== Newspeak vocabulary ==
This is a list of Newspeak words known from the novel. It does not include words carried over directly from English with no change in meaning, nor does it include regular uses of the listed affixes (e.g. "unbellyfeel") unless they are particularly significant.

The novel says that the Ministry of Truth uses a jargon "not actually Newspeak, but consisting largely of Newspeak words" for its internal memos. As many of the words in this list (e.g. "bb", "upsub") come from such memos, it is not certain whether those words are actually Newspeak.

- 3 yp – abbreviation of the Ninth Three-Year Plan, a production plan that is which briefly mentioned in a slip of paper to Winston.
- ante – the prefix that replaces before
- artsem – artificial insemination
- bb – Big Brother (Note: The appendix "The Principles of Newspeak" indicates that Big Brother is another, if not the only acceptable name for the figurehead in Newspeak.)
- bellyfeel – the blind, enthusiastic acceptance of an idea
- blackwhite – to accept whatever one is told, regardless of the facts; in the novel, it is described as "to say that black is white when [the Party says so]" and "to believe that black is white, and more, to know that black is white, and to forget that one has ever believed the contrary" (See also 2 + 2 = 5)
- crimestop – to rid oneself of or fail to understand unorthodox thoughts that go against Ingsoc's ideology
- crimethink – thoughts and concepts that go against Ingsoc such as liberty, equality, and privacy, and also the criminal act of holding such thoughts; frequently referred to as "thoughtcrime"
- dayorder – order of the day
- dep – department
- doubleplusgood – the word that replaces Oldspeak words meaning "superlatively good", such as excellent, fabulous, and fantastic
- doubleplusungood – the word that replaces Oldspeak words meaning "superlatively bad", such as terrible and horrible
- doublethink – the act of simultaneously believing two, mutually contradictory ideas
- duckspeak – automatic vocal support of political orthodoxies; this usually indicates one's delivery of speech dealing with political matters, delivered without any active thought and sounding very much like noise ("to quack like a duck"), but very clearly fully in line with Party ideology. In the novel, Syme, a Newspeak philologist, states "It is one of those interesting words that have two contradictory meanings. Applied to an opponent, it is abuse, applied to someone you agree with, it is praise."
- equal – the same in amount or quantity; not used in the sense of having equal rights or freedoms
- facecrime – a facial expression which reveals that one has committed thoughtcrime
- Ficdep – the Ministry of Truth's Fiction Department
- free – the absence and the lack of something; "intellectually free" and "politically free" have been replaced by crimethinkful
- fullwise – the word that replaces words such as fully, completely, and totally
- goodthink – a synonym for "political orthodoxy" and "a politically orthodox thought" as defined by the Party
- goodsex – sexual intercourse only for procreation, with no physical pleasure on the part of the woman, and strictly within marriage
- goodwise – the word that replaces well as an adverb
- Ingsoc – the political ideology of the Party, formerly known as English Socialism
- joycamp – labour camp
- malquoted – inaccurate representations of the words of Big Brother and of the Party, often used to justify manipulation of historical records
- malreported – something that has been reported incorrectly or in a way that contradicts the Party's official version of events
- Miniluv – the Ministry of Love, where the secret police interrogate and torture the enemies of Oceania (torture and brainwashing)
- Minipax – the Ministry of Peace, which wages war for Oceania
- Miniplenty – the Ministry of Plenty, which keeps the population in continual economic hardship (starvation and rationing)
- Minitrue – the Ministry of Truth, which manufactures consent by way of lies, propaganda, and distorted historical records, while supplying the proles (proletariat) with synthetic culture and entertainment
- Oldspeak – Standard English
- oldthink – ideas from the time before the Party's revolution, such as objectivity and rationalism
- ownlife – a person's anti-social tendency to enjoy solitude and individualism
- plusgood – the word that replaces Oldspeak words meaning "very good", such as great
- plusungood – the word that replaces "very bad"
- Pornosec – the pornography production section of the Ministry of Truth's Fiction Department
- prolefeed – popular culture for entertaining Oceania's working class
- Recdep – the Ministry of Truth's Records Department, where Winston Smith rewrites historical records so they conform to the Party's agenda
- rectify – the Ministry of Truth's euphemism for distorting a historical record
- ref – to refer (to someone or something)
- sec – sector
- sexcrime – any sex act that deviates from Party directives to use sex only for Party-approved procreation, such as fornication, adultery, oral/anal sex, and homosexuality
- speakwrite – a machine that transcribes speech into text
- Teledep – the Ministry of Truth's Telecommunications Department
- telescreen – a two-way television set with which the Party spies upon Oceania's population
- thoughtcrime – describes the personal beliefs that are contrary to the accepted norms of society
- thinkpol – the Thought Police, the secret police force of Oceania's government
- unperson – an executed person whose existence is erased from history and memory
- upsub – an upwards submission to higher authority

== See also ==
- Algospeak
- Authoritarian socialism
- Basic English
- Buzzword
  - Buzzword bingo
  - Buzzword compliant
- Glossary of the Greek military junta
- Glossary of Nazi Germany
- Groupthink
- Inclusive language
- Language and thought
- Linguistic determinism
- Linguistic imperialism
- Logocracy
- LTI – Lingua Tertii Imperii ("The Language of the Third Reich")
- Philosophy of language
- Politics and the English Language
- Sapir–Whorf hypothesis
- Soviet phraseology
- Un-word of the year

=== Fiction ===
- Ascian language
- Nadsat
