= Isaj Dratwer =

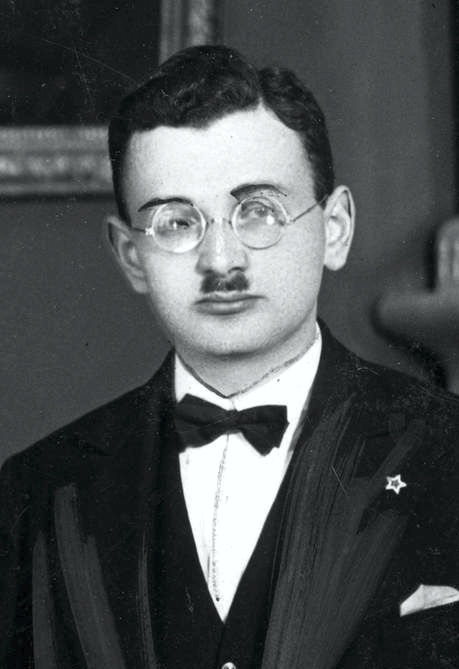
- Isaj Dratwer in 1939
- Born: January 1, 1905
- Died: 1985 (aged 80)
- Occupations: Bacteriologist, Esperantist

Isaj Dratwer (born January 1, 1905, Warsaw, died 1985) was a Polish Jewish bacteriologist and esperantist. In the Esperanto movement, Dratwer was a strong advocate, President of the Esperanto Academy, and committee secretary in 1927 and 1931. He often published articles or letters in the Heroldo de Esperanto (Esperanto Herald), Pola Esperantisto (Polish Esperantist) and others. He also translated Russian-language novels by Romanov in 1932.

He survived the Nazi concentration camps. In the 1950s he was secretary-general of the Polish Esperanto Association and in the 1960s he was president of the Esperanto League of Israel.

== Works ==
- Pri internacia lingvo dum jarcentoj. Tel-Aviv, 1st edition, 1970, 142 p.; 2nd edition, 1977, 320 p.
- Lidja Zamenhof. Vivo kaj agado. (Lidja Zamenhof, Life and work) Antverpeno/La Laguna, 1980, 112 p.
