= Hans Jakob (Esperantist) =

Hans Jakob Notz (Heidelberg, 15 December 1891 – Geneva, 1967) was a German-born Swiss Esperantist. His real name was Franz.

A student of Commerce, he moved from Heidelberg to Geneva in 1912, so that he could follow his studies. He would live in Geneva the rest of his life.

There he started to work for the World Esperanto Association, of which he had been a member since 1909. In 1934 he resigned from the role of Director, as a form of protest, and started working elsewhere. In the end, he worked in an office of the Swiss federation until he retired.

He got married two times, and had a daughter. He was a member of the Swiss Socialist Party.

== Jakob and Esperanto ==
In 1920 Jakob became the director of the central office of UEA; he cared after the publication of Jarlibroj and after the magazine Esperanto. He became General Director of the World Esperanto Association in 1924; he left the post in 1934, when he resigned, as a form of protest, during the World Esperanto Congress in Stockholm.

Since 1936, when the association split into two branches (headquartered respectively in Geneva and London), he began once again to serve as a redactor for the Genevan association. After the reunification of the two associations, in 1947, he joined the governing council of the reborn UEA and started caring after the magazine. In 1955 he resigned from all the posts as a form of protest, but he was nevertheless awarded the title "honorary redactor".

In 1960 the governing council of UEA learnt that Jakob had been unduly taking some money from the association; a years-long judicial procedure followed suit. When Jakob died, in 1967, UEA inherited part of his money.

== Works ==
- Universala Esperanto-Asocio 1908-1933: Historia skizo, Geneva, 1934
- Servisto de l' ideo: 50 jaroj ĉe Universala Esperanto-Asocio / 1908 - 1958; a history of UEA with an autobiographical connotation, redacted by Mark Fettes and published by Flandra Esperanto-Ligo in 1995.
- Jakob also contributed to the 1934 Enciklopedio de Esperanto, under the pseudonym "George Agricola".

== Bibliography ==
- Marcus Sikosek (Ziko van Dijk): Die neutrale Sprache. Eine politische Geschichte des Esperanto-Weltbundes. Skonpres, Bydgoszcz, 2006. 459 pages. ISBN 978-83-89962-03-4.
