= Yamaga Taiji =

Japanese anarchist and Esperantist (1892–1970)

Yamaga Taiji (Japanese: 山鹿 泰治, ヤマガ タイジ) (1892–1970) was a Japanese anarchist and Esperantist.

== Biography ==
Yamaga Taiji was born in 1892 to a printing family in Kyoto. Yamaga moved to Tokyo, where he studied Esperanto with historian and Esperantist Katsumu Kuroita. At age sixteen, Yamaga served as the secretary of Kuroita's Japan Esperanto Society. In 1911, Yamaga was introduced to anarchist Sakae Osugi. Yamaga became an assistant to anarchist Osugi. At Osugi's request, Yamaga visited Chinese anarchist Liu Shifu and his comrades in Shanghai. He stayed at Shifu's headquarter for several weeks. Shifu invited Yamaga to help him publish the journal Minsheng.

Yamaga returned to Japan to help with the publication of the Heimin Shimbun. In 1922, Yamaga was able secure Osugi a false passport.

He taught Esperanto, a compulsory subject, at the Shanghai National Labor University founded by the Chinese Nationalist Party.

Beginning in 1939, he lived in Shanghai, Kaohsiung, Taipei, and Manila. He returned to Kyoto in 1946. In 1960, Yamaga attended the tenth international meeting of the War Resisters' International in India. In 1962, Yamaga began writing an illustrated memoirs entitled The Twilight Journal. The Yamaga Manga. He died on December 6, 1970.

During his time as a political prisoner, he first read the Tao Te Ching and considered it to be an Eastern form of anarchism. Despite his Chinese anarchist associates considered the book too passive, Yamaga both championed and translated it into Japanese (1939) and Esperanto (1957). He included commentary on each chapter in his Esperanto version. He wrote that Laozi's chapter 57, for example, was "the first anarchist statement" against politics, the State, and against one person ruling another. (Peter Kropotkin had made a similar claim of lineage.) Yamaga's Esperanto translation traveled the globe, as Eduardo Vivancos translated it into Spanish and an anarchist press printed it in Mexico.

He is survived by his wife Mika Shigehara.
