= Japanese Esperanto Institute =

Esperanto language center in Japan

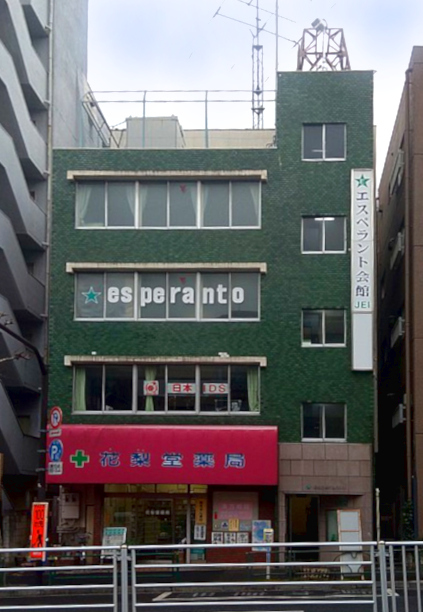
Headquarter of the Japanese Esperanto Institute.

The Japanese Esperanto Institute (Esperanto: Japana Esperanto-Instituto; Japanese: 日本エスペラント協会, Nihon Esuperanto-Kyokai) or JEI is the largest center of the Japanese Esperanto movement.

== Background ==
The Japanese Esperanto Institute was founded in 1919, mainly by Osaka Kenzi. Its official headquarters are in Tokyo, on Waseda Avenue.

It is the national affiliate of the World Esperanto Association. Its premises include a library, bookshop, classrooms and archives. It has over 1,300 members. There are 80 local Esperanto clubs in Japan. The Institute publishes the journal La Revuo Orienta ("The Oriental Review").

One of its first directors was Ōishi Wasaburō, the discoverer of the strong upper air currents known as jet streams.
