= Eugène Lanti =

French Esperantist, socialist, and writer (1879–1947)

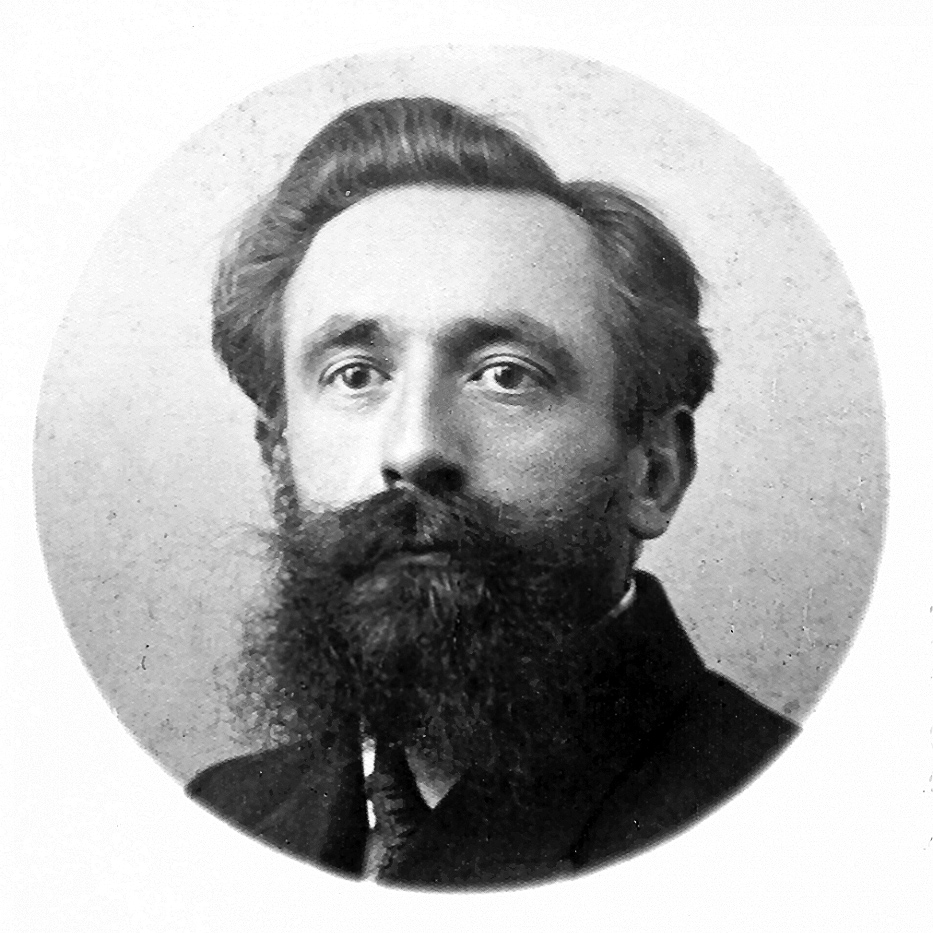
- Born: 19 July 1879; Néhou
- Died: 17 January 1947 (aged 67); Mexico City
- Occupation: Writer
- Spouse(s): Ellen Kate Limouzin

Eugène Lanti was a pseudonym of Eugène Aristide Alfred Adam (19 July 1879 in Normandy, France – 17 January 1947 in Mexico), an Esperantist, socialist and writer. He was a founder of Sennacieca Asocio Tutmonda, and a longtime editor of the internationalist socialist magazine Sennaciulo. Lanti was a critic of Stalinism and the theoretician of a new doctrine, anationalism, which aimed to eliminate the very concept of the nation as a guiding idea of social organisation.

== Biography ==
Lanti's parents were peasant farmers. In his early life he worked as an agricultural labourer, carpenter, furniture maker and designer. He was self-educated, and studied in the evening. In 1914 he was mobilised in the First World War and served as an ambulance driver. He learnt Esperanto in 1914–15 at the Western Front, but in 1919 was almost persuaded to abandon Esperanto in favour of Ido. Following the war, he returned to Paris, became acquainted with Lucien Bannier and Ludoviko Glodeau, and he reaffirmed his support for Esperanto with his editorship of Liberiga Stelo.

In the 1920s Lanti lived in Paris with Ellen Kate Limouzin, the aunt of George Orwell. Orwell visited the couple and suffered as a non-speaker of Esperanto, and developed a strong dislike for the language. It has been suggested that Orwell included elements of Esperanto in the "Newspeak" language he created in his anti-totalitarian novel, Nineteen Eighty-Four.

== Lanti's political career ==
In his youth Lanti had been attracted to anarchism, but in 1920 he abandoned anarchism and became a founding member of the French Communist Party. In 1921 in Prague he was the initiator and de facto leader of Sennacieca Asocio Tutmonda (SAT), a broad-based Esperanto-speaking organisation (containing Communists, Social Democrats and anarchists) which does not organise along national lines.

In 1933 Lanti, wounded by personal attacks and criticisms of his leadership, left his position of president of the Central Committee of SAT, a position he had occupied since the foundation of the organization. He continued, however, to play a role in the organisation chiefly as a writer. In 1935 Lanti founded the independent magazine Herezulo in which he criticised the Soviet regime more forcefully than in Sennaciulo.

== Lanti as lexicographer ==
Lanti was self-taught both in his use of literary French and Esperanto. He worked with Petit Larousse, and sought to create an Esperanto dictionary of the same type. He was centrally involved in the project run by SAT for the writing and design of the Plena Vortaro which later became today's Plena Ilustrita Vortaro.

== Later years ==
After his retirement in 1937, to meet Esperantists, Lanti left France for good and travelled to Spain, Portugal, North Africa, Japan, Australia, New Zealand and South America. Suffering from an incurable illness, he hanged himself in his flat in Mexico on 17 January 1947.
