= Sennacieca Asocio Tutmonda =

Independent Esperanto association

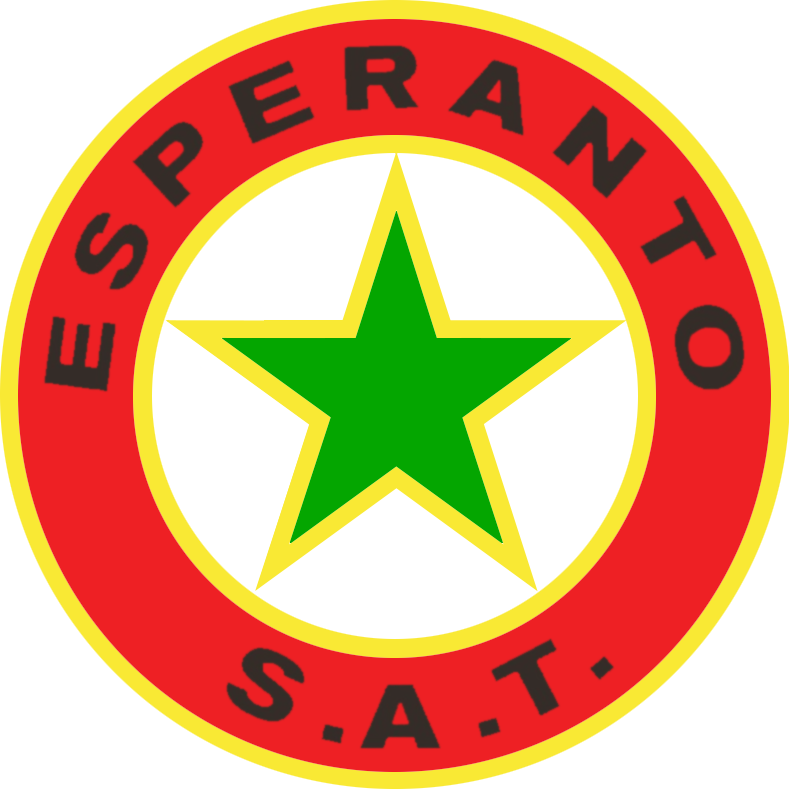
SAT Logo

Sennacieca Asocio Tutmonda (pronounced [sennat͡siˈet͡sa asoˈt͡sio tutˈmonda], SAT; English: World Anational Association) is an independent worldwide cultural Esperanto association of a general far left-wing orientation. Its headquarters are in Paris. According to Jacques Schram, chairman of the Executive Committee, the membership totalled 881 in 2003. In 2006 SAT had 724 members. In 2015-2016 there were 525.

SAT uses Esperanto as its working language and aims through the use of Esperanto to enable progressive individuals, organizations and workers of all countries to exchange ideas and meet on the basis of equality across national barriers. Members of SAT are involved in socialist, anarchist, peace, trade union, anti-nationalist, feminist and environmental activities, among others.

== History ==
SAT was founded in 1921 by Eugène Lanti (pseudonym of Eugène Adam) and others as an organisation of the workers' Esperanto movement. It was the largest and most active between the two World Wars. At its high point in 1929-1930 it had 6524 members in 1674 communities in 42 countries. It suffered heavy attrition soon after, however, when "cosmopolitan" activities, a category into which Esperanto fell, began to be persecuted in the Soviet Union after the onset of Stalinism, and after the ban on the workers' Esperanto movement in Germany that took effect immediately after the Nazi takeover in 1933. The Soviet Union and Germany had been the countries in which SAT had the greatest number of members. Ideologically motivated internal schisms, involving at various times anarchists, communists and social democrats, also took a toll.

== Aims ==
The following declaration of aims became part of the Statute at the foundation of SAT in 1921, and remains valid to this day:

"a) to utilise the international language Esperanto for the class aims of the worldwide working class; b) to promote mutual relations among members in the best and most worthy way possible, in order to instill in them a strong sense of human solidarity; c) to instruct, educate and enlighten the members in such a way as to make them the most capable and best of the so-called internationalists; d) to serve as an intermediary in relations among organisations using other languages but having aims analogous to those of SAT; e) to be an intermediary and supporter in the creation of an Esperanto literature consisting both of translations and original texts, and which reflects the ideal of our association."

In 1928 it was further clarified in the following addendum:

"SAT, an educational and cultural organisation rather than an overtly political one, tries to induce its members to be understanding and tolerant of the political and philosophical schools or systems that lie at the base of the various workers' parties that are oriented toward class struggle and of trade-union movements; it seeks, by means of comparison of facts and ideas and by means of free discussion, to enable its members to avoid the dogmatisation of the teachings they encounter in their particular milieus. In short, SAT constantly applies a rationally elaborated language on a worldwide scale in order to aid in the creation of intellects that think rationally and are able to compare accurately, understand correctly and assess ideas, theses and tendencies in such a way as to render them capable of electing independently the path they believe most direct or most expedient to the end of liberating their class and guiding the human race towards a level of civilisation and culture that is as advanced as possible."

SAT does not exist primarily to promote Esperanto – although it has a department that engages in such activity – but rather puts Esperanto to use for its political and educational purposes. Esperanto is promoted by separate regional organisations that are linked to SAT by contract. Most of these organisations are not national in scope, but encompass the territory of a particular language. The largest such organisation is SAT-Amikaro, which encompasses all French-speaking territories.

== Structure ==
SAT has a non-national structure that deliberately avoids taking national differences into account. Its members join individually, not through the intermediary of a national section. The Universal Esperanto Association was structured in the same way when it was founded at the beginning of the 20th century by Hector Hodler. As for SAT, it was laid out by Eugène Lanti in a series of articles that appeared prior to the foundation of the Association in 1921.

The decision-making structure of SAT is, in theory, close to the organisational base, to the extent that all congress decisions should become valid only after a referendum. This statutory provision is intended to foment grass-roots democracy. In practice, many congress decisions are never submitted to a referendum. The association is governed by an eight-member Executive Committee, currently headed by Vinko Markov.

== Affiliated organizations ==
=== SATEB ===
SATEB (Workers’ Esperanto Movement) is the British affiliate of the SAT. It organizes an annual residential weekend at the Wedgwood Memorial College, Barlaston, Stoke-on-Trent. The main feature of these meetings is the visit of Esperanto-speaking lecturers from abroad (e.g. from Cuba, Germany, the Netherlands, Belgium, and other countries).

Members of SATEB receive the bilingual quarterly magazine La Verda Proleto.

==== Proposed suspension ====
At the 2007 annual meeting of SATEB—which seven people attended, including the guest speaker—the committee proposed a motion to suspend activity of SATEB until there emerged sufficient people to perform its essential roles. However, after debate it was decided to continue at a minimal level of activity.

== Activity ==
SAT publishes the monthly magazine Sennaciulo ["The Non-National"] and the annual cultural review Sennacieca Revuo. SAT's publishing cooperative also produces a variety of books, some of them of an educational nature, such as the Plena Ilustrita Vortaro, the most comprehensive Esperanto dictionary, as well as socially engaged literary works. It has recently begun to publish educational and political matter on the Internet.

It organises an annual international congress, which deals with both the affairs of the association and matters of general political concern.

== See also ==
- Anarchism and Esperanto
