= 2021 in public domain =

When a work's copyright expires, it enters the public domain. The following is a list of creators whose works entered the public domain in 2021. Since laws vary globally, the copyright status of some works are not uniform.

== Entering the public domain in countries with life + 70 years ==
With the exception of Belarus (where the copyright protection is life + 50 years) and Spain (which has a copyright term of life + 80 years for creators that died before 1987), a work enters the public domain in Europe 70 years after the creator's death, if it was published during the creator's lifetime. For previously unpublished material, those who publish it first will have the publication rights for 25 years. The list is sorted alphabetically and includes a notable work of the creator that entered the public domain on 1 January 2021.

| Names | Country | Death | Occupation | Notable work |
|---|---|---|---|---|
| Henry H. Arnold | United States | 15 January 1950 | General | Published works |
| Octave-Louis Aubert | France | 14 January 1950 | Writer, journalist | Le Livre de la Bretagne |
| Irving Bacheller | United States | 24 February 1950 | Writer, journalist | Eben Holden |
| Sergei Bakhrushin | Russia | 8 March 1950 | Historian | |
| Miklós Bánffy | Hungary | 5 June 1950 | Nobleman, politician, writer | A Transylvanian Tale |
| Pavel Bazhov | Russia | 3 December 1950 | Writer | The Malachite Box |
| Max Beckmann | Germany | 27 December 1950 | Painter, draftsman, printmaker, sculptor | |
| William Rose Benét | United States | 4 May 1950 | Writer, poet, editor | Saturday Review of Literature, The Reader's Encyclopedia |
| Lev Berg | Russia | 24 December 1950 | Geographer, biologist and ichthyologist | |
| Ben Black | United States | 26 December 1950 | Composer, lyricist | "Moonlight and Roses" |
| Léon Blum | France | 30 March 1950 | Politician | Les Problèmes de la Paix |
| Ambrogio Bollati | Italy | 26 March 1950 | General, Historian | Works |
| D. K. Broster | United Kingdom | 7 February 1950 | Novelist | The Flight of the Heron |
| Herbert Ashwin Budd | United Kingdom | 1950 | Painter | |
| Joe Burke | United States | 9 June 1950 | Songwriter, Composer, pianist | "Dancing With Tears in My Eyes", "Painting the Clouds With Sunshine", "Rambling Rose", "Tip-Toe Through the Tulips" |
| Edgar Rice Burroughs | United States | 19 March 1950 | Author of adventure and science fiction | Tarzan and Barsoom |
| J. Carlos | Brazil | 2 October 1950 | Cartoonist, illustrator, graphic designer, sculptor | |
| Basilio Cascella | Italy | 24 July 1950 | Artist | Il bagno della pastora |
| Alfonso Daniel Rodríguez Castelao | Spain | 7 January 1950 | Painter | |
| Neville William Cayley | Australia | 17 March 1950 | Ornithologist & artist | "What Bird is That?", 1931 |
| Francesco Cilea | Italy | 20 November 1950 | Composer | L'arlesiana and Adriana Lecouvreur |
| Leôncio Correia (pt) | Brazil | 19 June 1950 | Lawyer, politician, writer and journalist | |
| Erle Cox | Australia | 20 November 1950 | Journalist and science fiction writer | Out of the Silence |
| Walter Damrosch | United States | 22 December 1950 | Composer | |
| Frank Parker Day | Canada | 30 July 1950 | Author and academic | |
| Warwick Deeping | United Kingdom | 20 April 1950 | Author | Sorrell and Son |
| Buddy DeSylva | United States | 11 July 1950 | Songwriter | Avalon, Look For the Silver Lining, Somebody Loves Me |
| Edward d'Evry | United Kingdom | 25 December 1950 | Composer | |
| Lancelot de Mole | Australia | 6 May 1950 | Engineer & inventor | Tracked armoured vehicle, 1911 |
| Clément Doucet | Belgium | 15 October 1950 | Composer, pianist | |
| Anatoly Drozdov (ru) | Russia | 10 September 1950 | Composer, pianist | |
| Theodor Duesterberg | Germany | 4 November 1950 | Politician | The Steel Helmet and Hitler |
| Walter Eucken | Germany | 20 March 1950 | Economist | Works |
| Percy Keese Fitzhugh | United States | 5 July 1950 | Author of children and young adult literature | |
| Yevgeny Gunst | Russia | 30 January 1950 | Composer | |
| John Gould Fletcher | United States | 10 May 1950 | Poet | Selected Poems |
| Ernest Haycox | United States | 13 October 1950 | Author of Western fiction | |
| John Rippiner Heath | United Kingdom | 23 December 1950 | Doctor, musician, composer | Three Macedonian Sketches |
| William Hovgaard | Denmark; United States | 5 January 1950 | Professor, Writer | Submarine Boats, The Voyages Of The Norsemen To America |
| Heydar Huseynov | Azerbaijan | 15 August 1950 | Philosopher | Dialectical Materialism |
| Rex Ingram | United States | 2 July 1950 | Film director, producer, writer and actor | The Four Horsemen of the Apocalypse, The Prisoner of Zenda |
| George Cecil Ives | United Kingdom | 4 June 1950 | Writer, penal reformer | English Prisons Today |
| Émile Jaques-Dalcroze | Switzerland | 1 July 1950 | Composer, music educator | |
| Johannes V. Jensen | Denmark | 25 November 1950 | Author | The Long Journey |
| Charles L. Johnson | United States | 28 December 1950 | Composer | |
| Al Jolson | United States | 23 October 1950 | Songwriter | |
| Eddie Kilfeather | United States | 13 January 1950 | Composer | |
| Alfred Korzybski | Russian Empire; United States | 1 March 1950 | Engineer and founder of Institute of General Semantics | Science and Sanity: An Introduction to Non-Aristotelian Systems and General Semantics |
| Sigizmund Krzhizhanovsky | Russia | 28 December 1950 | Writer | |
| Harold Laski | United Kingdom | 24 March 1950 | Political theorist, economist | A Grammar of Politics |
| Harry Lauder | United Kingdom | 26 February 1950 | Comedian, Singer/songwriter | Roamin' in the Gloamin' |
| Lilian Sophia Locke | Australia | 1 July 1950 | Suffragette & Trade-unionist | Secretary of the United Council for Woman's Suffrage, 1890s |
| Heinrich Mann | Germany | 11 March 1950 | Writer | Professor Unrat |
| Edgar Lee Masters | United States | 5 March 1950 | Writer | Spoon River Anthology |
| F. O. Matthiessen | United States | 1 April 1950 | literary critic | American Renaissance: Art and Expression in the Age of Emerson and Whitman |
| Marcel Mauss | France | 10 February 1950 | Sociologist | The Gift |
| Ernest John Moeran | United Kingdom | 1 December 1950 | Composer | |
| Alfred Edward Moffat | United Kingdom | 6 June 1950 | Composer, collector of music | Meister-Schule der alten Zeit |
| Edna St Vincent Millay | United States | 19 October 1950 | Poet, playwright | Renascence |
| Ali Moustafa Mosharafa | Egypt | 16 January 1950 | Theoretical physicist | |
| Lewis Muir | United States | 19 January 1950 | Songwriter | Ragtime Cowboy Joe |
| Pavel Muratov | Russia | 5 February 1950 | Writer, art historian | Images of Italy |
| Nikolai Myaskovsky | Russia | 8 August 1950 | Composer | Symphony No. 6 (Myaskovsky) |
| Vaslav Nijinsky | Russia | 8 April 1950 | Ballet dancer and choreographer | Diary |
| George Orwell | United Kingdom | 21 January 1950 | Journalist and author | Animal Farm, Nineteen Eighty-Four also see George Orwell bibliography |
| Cesare Pavese | Italy | 27 August 1950 | Writer, translator | The Moon and the Bonfires |
| Max Pemberton | United Kingdom | 22 February 1950 | Novelist of adventure and mystery literature | |
| Octávio Pinto | Brazil | 31 October 1944 | Composer, architect | |
| Ernest Poole | United States | 10 January 1950 | Writer | His Family |
| Gustaf John Ramstedt | Russian Empire; Finland | 25 November 1950 | Explorer, linguist, diplomat | Seitsemän retkeä itään |
| R. R. Ryan | United Kingdom | 18 October 1950 | Author | |
| Eliel Saarinen | Russian Empire; Finland; United States | 1 July 1950 | Architect | Works |
| Rafael Sabatini | Italy; United Kingdom | 13 February 1950 | Writer | The Sea Hawk, Scaramouche, The Odissey of Captain Blood, Bellarion the Fortunate |
| Theophrastos Sakellaridis | Greece | 2 January 1950 | Composer, conductor | Ο Βαφτιστικός |
| Guðjón Samúelsson | Iceland | 25 April 1950 | Architect | Hallgrímskirkja, National Theatre of Iceland, Akureyrarkirkja |
| Joseph Schumpeter | Austria | 8 January 1950 | Economist | Capitalism, Socialism and Democracy |
| Milton Schwarzwald | United States | 2 March 1950 | Director, composer | |
| George Bernard Shaw | United Kingdom; Ireland | 2 November 1950 | Writer | Man and Superman, Pygmalion, Saint Joan |
| Adaline Shepherd | United States | 12 March 1950 | Composer | |
| Forrest Shreve | United States | 19 July 1950 | Botanist | Works |
| Martinus Sieveking | Netherlands | 26 November 1950 | Composer, music teacher | |
| Jan Smuts | South Africa | 11 September 1950 | Statesman, military leader, and philosopher | Holism and Evolution |
| John M. Stahl | United States | 12 January 1950 | Film Director and Producer | Father Was a Fullback |
| Olaf Stapledon | United Kingdom | 6 September 1950 | Philosopher and science fiction author | Star Maker, Last and First Men and Odd John |
| Henry L. Stimson | United States | 20 October 1950 | Politician | Democracy And Nationalism In Europe |
| Tatiana Sukhotina-Tolstaya | Russia | 21 September 1950 | Painter and memoirist | |
| Attilio Teruzzi | Italy | 26 April 1950 | Politician | Cirenaica Verde |
| Trilussa | Italy | 21 December 1950 | Poet | Works |
| Orhan Veli Kanık | Turkey | 14 November 1950 | Poet | Garip, Collected Poems |
| Xavier Villaurrutia | Mexico | 25 December 1950 | Poet, Playwright | Works |
| Archibald P. Wavell | United Kingdom | 24 May 1950 | General | Generals And Generalship |
| Kurt Weill | Germany | 3 April 1950 | Composer | The Threepenny Opera |
| Yi Gwangsu | South Korea | 25 October 1950 | Writer, independence activist | Heartless |

== Entering the public domain in countries with life + 80 years ==
Spain (for creators that died before 1987), Colombia and Equatorial Guinea have a copyright term of life + 80 years. The list is sorted alphabetically and includes one notable work that entered the public domain on 1 January 2021 for each creator.

List of authors
| Names | Country | Death | Occupation | Notable work |
|---|---|---|---|---|
| J.-H. Rosny aîné | France | 11 February 1940 | Writer | The Quest for Fire |
| Xerardo Álvarez Limeses | Spain | 1940 | Teacher, writer | |
| Manuel Azaña | Spain | 1940 | Politician, political writer, Prime Minister | |
| Julián Besteiro | Spain | 27 September 1940 | | |
| E. F. Benson | United Kingdom | 29 February 1940 | Writer, archaeologist | Mapp and Lucia |
| Mikhail Bulgakov | Russia | 10 March 1940 | Writer, playwright, medical doctor | The Master and Margarita |
| Rafael Flores Nieto | Spain | 25 November 1940 | Flamenco singer and guitarist | |
| Philip Francis Nowlan | United States | 1 February 1940 | Writer | Armageddon 2419 A.D. |
| F. Scott Fitzgerald | United States | 21 December 1940 | Novelist, essayist, screenwriter, and short-story writer | This Side of Paradise, The Beautiful and Damned, The Great Gatsby and Tender Is the Night |
| Carlos Gómez Carrera | Spain | 28 June 1940 | Cartoonist | |
| Antonio de Hoyos y Vinent | Spain | 1940 | Playwright | Bibliography |
| Louis J. Panella | United States | 3 March 1940 | Composer | |
| Enrique Peinador | Spain | 1940 | Businessman | |
| Indalecio Varela Lenzano | Spain | 1940 | Musicologist, music critic | |
| María Vinyals | Spain | 1940 | Publicist, essayist | |

== Countries with life + 60 years ==
In Bangladesh, India, and Venezuela a work enters the public domain 60 years after the creator's death.

| Names | Country | Death | Occupation | Notable work |
|---|---|---|---|---|
| Chris van Abkoude | Netherlands | 2 January 1960 | Writer, Novelist | Pietje Bell |
| Vai. Mu. Kothainayaki Ammal | India | 20 February 1960 | Novelist | |
| Lady Cynthia Asquith | United Kingdom | 31 March 1960 | Author and editor | This Mortal Coil |
| Rajshekhar Basu | India | 27 April 1960 | Chemist | |
| Eric Temple Bell | United Kingdom; United States | 21 December 1960 | Mathematician and science fiction writer | |
| Albert Camus | France | 4 January 1960 | Philosopher, author | The Stranger |
| A. Chakravarti | India | 10 February 1960 | Professor | |
| Indira Devi Chaudhurani | India | 12 August 1960 | Musician | |
| Sudhindranath Dutta | India | 25 June 1960 | Poet, journalist | |
| Victor Rousseau Emanuel | United Kingdom | 6 April 1960 | Author | |
| John Russell Fearn | United Kingdom | 18 September 1960 | Author | |
| M. Raghava Iyengar | India | 1960 | Literary scholar | |
| Jigar Moradabadi | India | 9 September 1960 | Poet | Yeh Hai Maikada |
| Bal Krishna Sharma Naveen | India | 29 April 1960 | Poet, journalist, activist | |
| Elsie J. Oxenham | United Kingdom | 9 January 1960 | Children's novelist | Abbey Series of books |
| Boris Pasternak | Russia | 30 May 1960 | Poet, author | Doctor Zhivago |
| Eden Phillpotts | United Kingdom | 29 December 1960 | Author, poet and dramatist | The Farmer's Wife |
| Kesari Balakrishna Pillai | India | 18 December 1960 | Literary critic, journalist | Kesari |
| Nathuram Premi | India | 30 January 1960 | Poet, publisher | |
| Navaratna Rama Rao | India | 1960 | Political leader, scholar | |
| Sushila Samad | India | 10 December 1960 | Poet, journalist | |
| Sripada Krishnamurty Sastry | India | 29 December 1960 | Poet | Mahamahopadhyaya |
| Kshitimohan Sen | India | 12 March 1960 | Professor | |
| Acharya Chatursen Shastri | India | 2 February 1960 | Writer | Dharamputra |
| Krishnalal Shridharani | India | 23 July 1960 | Poet, playwright | |
| Nevil Shute | United Kingdom | 12 January 1960 | Aeronautical engineer, novelist | On the Beach |
| Victor Sjöström | Sweden | 3 January 1960 | Film director, actor | The Phantom Carriage |
| C. J. Thomas | India | 14 July 1960 | Playwright, academic, artist | |
| Dadasaheb Torne | India | 19 January 1960 | Film director | Shree Pundalik |

== Entering the public domain in countries with life + 50 years ==
In most countries of Africa and Asia, as well as Belarus, Bolivia, Canada, New Zealand, Egypt and Uruguay, a work enters the public domain 50 years after the creator's death.

| Names | Country | Death | Occupation | Notable work |
|---|---|---|---|---|
| Abdul Hosein Amini | Iran | 3 July 1970 | Theologian | Al-Ghadir |
| Rita Angus | New Zealand | 25 January 1970 | Painter | Cass |
| Shmuel Yosef Agnon | Israel | 17 February 1970 | Writer | The Bridal Canopy |
| Fernando Arbello | Puerto Rico | 26 July 1970 | Musician | |
| Otto Baecker | Germany | 22 May 1970 | Cinematographer | Gold |
| Archibald Baxter | New Zealand | 10 August 1970 | Socialist, pacifist | We Will Not Cease |
| William Beaudine | United States | 18 March 1970 | Film director, actor | Boys Will Be Boys |
| George Blair | United States | 19 April 1970 | Film Director | |
| R. V. C. Bodley | United Kingdom | 26 May 1970 | Army officer, author | Algeria From Within |
| Louise Bogan | United States | 4 February 1970 | Poet | Body of This Death |
| Vera Brittain | United Kingdom | 29 March 1970 | Writer | Testament of Youth |
| William J. Brown | United States | 4 February 1970 | Architect | |
| Mohamed Fadhel Ben Achour | Tunisia | 20 April 1970 | Theologian | Works |
| Dulce Carman | New Zealand | 1970 | Author | Neath the Maori Moon |
| Rudolf Carnap | Germany | 14 September 1970 | Philosopher | Der Logische Aufbau der Welt |
| Choe Hyeon-bae | South Korea | 23 March 1970 | Educationalist | Selected publications |
| Émile Coderre | Canada | 6 April 1970 | Poet | Works |
| Charles Cotton | New Zealand | 29 June 1970 | Geologist | Geomorphology of New Zealand |
| Mohamed Abdelaziz Djaït | Tunisia | 5 January 1970 | Theologian | Works |
| William Dobell | Australia | 13 May 1970 | Artist | Mr Joshua Smith |
| Guy Endore | United States | 12 February 1970 | Author, screenwriter | The Werewolf of Paris |
| E. M. Forster | United Kingdom | 7 June 1970 | Writer | Works |
| Babbis Friis-Baastad | Norway | 10 January 1970 | Children's writer | Ikke ta Bamse |
| Erle Stanley Gardner | United States | 11 March 1970 | Author, lawyer | Perry Mason series of books |
| Maurice Gemayel | Lebanon | 31 October 1970 | Politician | Tripoli and Decentralization |
| L. Wolfe Gilbert | United States | 12 July 1970 | Songwriter | Down Yonder |
| Rube Goldberg | United States | 7 December 1970 | Cartoonist, News reporter, Sculptor, Engineer | |
| John Gunther | United States | 29 May 1970 | Author | Death Be Not Proud |
| Muhsin al-Hakim | Iraq | 1970 | Theologian | Minhaj as-Saleheen |
| Alice Hamilton | United States | 22 September 1970 | Physician, research scientist | Industrial Poisons in the United States |
| Lawren Harris | Canada | 29 January 1970 | Painter | |
| Marlen Haushofer | Austria | 21 March 1970 | Writer | |
| Erich Heckel | Germany | 27 January 1970 | Artist | Roquairol |
| Jimi Hendrix | United States | 18 September 1970 | Musician, singer-songwriter | "Purple Haze" |
| Roman Ingarden | Poland | 14 June 1970 | Philosopher | The Literary Work of Art |
| Michał Kalecki | Poland | 18 April 1970 | Economist | Próba teorii koniunktury |
| William Archibald Mackintosh | Canada | 29 December 1970 | Economist | Economic Problems Of The Prairie Provinces |
| Leopoldo Marechal | Argentina | 26 June 1970 | Writer | Adam Buenosayres |
| François Mauriac | France | 1 September 1970 | Writer | Thérèse Desqueyroux |
| Bruce McLaren | New Zealand | 2 June 1970 | Racing car driver | Bruce McLaren: From the Cockpit |
| Yukio Mishima | Japan | 25 November 1970 | Novelist, playwright, poet, writer, essayist, critic | Works |
| Gamal Abdel Nasser | Egypt | 28 September 1970 | Politician | Philosophy of Revolution |
| Charles Olson | United States | 10 January 1970 | Poet | Works |
| John Dos Passos | United States | 28 September 1970 | Novelist | U.S.A. trilogy |
| Waldo Peirce | United States | 8 March 1970 | Painter | Legends of the Hudson |
| Vladimir Propp | Russia | 22 August 1970 | Folklorist | Morphology of the Tale |
| Alf Prøysen | Norway | 23 November 1970 | Musician, Writer, Composer | Works |
| Erich Maria Remarque | Germany | 25 September 1970 | Novelist | All Quiet on the Western Front |
| Ali Riahi | Tunisia | 27 March 1970 | Musician | |
| Gonzalo Roig | Cuba | 13 June 1970 | Composer | Cecilia Valdés |
| Mark Rothko | United States | 25 February 1970 | Abstract painter | Black on Maroon |
| Bertrand Russell | United Kingdom | 2 February 1970 | Philosopher, mathematician | Principia Mathematica |
| Nelly Sachs | German Empire; Sweden | 12 May 1970 | Poet, Writer | Works |
| Ruth Sawyer | United States | 3 June 1970 | Writer | Roller Skates |
| Slim Harpo | United States | 31 January 1970 | Blues Musician | I'm a King Bee |
| William Stewart Wallace | Canada | 11 March 1970 | Historian | Encyclopedia of Canada |
| Hassan Taqizadeh | Iran | 28 January 1970 | Politician | Old Iranian Calendars |
| Sophie Treadwell | United States | 20 February 1970 | Playwright | Machinal |
| Jacob Viner | Canada | 12 September 1970 | Economist | Works |
| Otto Heinrich Warburg | Germany | 1 August 1970 | Physiologist | The Metabolism of Tumours |
| Leonard Wild | New Zealand | 23 July 1970 | Agricultural scientist, writer | An Experiment in Self-government, Soils and Manures in New Zealand |
| Harry M. Woods | United States | 14 January 1970 | Songwriter | When the Red, Red Robin (Comes Bob, Bob, Bobbin' Along) |
| Abraham Zapruder | United States | 30 August 1970 | Clothing manufacturer | Zapruder film |
| Mahmoud Zulfikar | Egypt | 22 May 1970 | Director | Filmography |

== Entering the public domain in Australia ==
In 2004 copyright in Australia changed from a "plus 50" law to a "plus 70" law, in line with the United States and the European Union. However, the change was not made retroactive (unlike the 1995 change in the European Union which brought the works of those who died from 1925 to 1944 back into copyright). Hence the work of an author who died before 1955 is normally in the public domain in Australia; but the copyright of authors was extended to 70 years after death for those who died in 1955 or later, and no more Australian authors would come out of copyright until 1 January 2026 (those who died in 1955).

Unpublished works by authors who died in 1950 entered the public domain. Any published literary, artistic, dramatic, or musical work (other than computer programs) by a not generally known author (anonymous or pseudonymous) from 1950 also entered the public domain.

| Names | Country | Death | Occupation | Notable work |
|---|---|---|---|---|
| Cyril Tenison White | Australia | 16 August 1950 | Botanist/Explorer | Made significant contributions to knowledge of the flora of Queensland and northern New South Wales, and was regarded as an authority on tropical plants. |
| Erle Cox | Australia | 20 November 1950 | Writer | "Out of the Silence" |
| Dame Mary Cook | Australia | 24 September 1950 | Social Work | Vice President of the "War Chest Society" and President of the "Parramatta Branch of the Red Cross Society" |
| Frank Brennan | Australia | 6 November 1950 | Politician | Noted Pacifist |
| Ted Colson | Australia | 27 February 1950 | Anthropologist | Crossing of the Simpson Desert |
| Ian Morrison | Australia | 12 August 1950 | Journalist | "This War against Japan : Thoughts on the Present Conflict in the Far East" 1944 |
| Andrew Oswald Wilson | Australia | 19 June 1950 | Architect | Boulder Town Hall |
| George Ainsworth | Australia | 11 October 1950 | Meteorologist & photographer | Leader of the Macquarie Island party of the Australian Antarctic Expedition, December 1911 to November 1913 |
| Neville William Cayley | Australia | 17 March 1950 | Ornithologist & artist | "What Bird is That?", 1931 |
| Lilian Sophia Locke | Australia | 1 July 1950 | Suffragette & Trade-unionist | Secretary of the United Council for Woman's Suffrage, 1890s |
| Lancelot de Mole | Australia | 6 May 1950 | Engineer & inventor | Tracked armoured vehicle, 1911 |
| Ada May Plante | Australia | 3 July 1950 | Painter | Founding exhibitor at Pioneering Post-Impressionist Melbourne Contemporary Group, 1932 |
| Beaumont Smith | Australia | 2 January 1950 | Film director | "Our Friends the Hayseeds", 1917 |
| Horace Stevens | Australia | 18 November 1950 | Opera singer | Samuel Coleridge Taylor's "Hiawatha" London premiere, 1924 |
| Clas Edvard Friström | Australia | 27 March 1950 | Painter | Exhibited 53 paintings with the Queensland Art Society, 1899-1902 |
| Constance Elizabeth Darcy | Australia | 25 April 1950 | Gynaecologist | Member of the Royal College of Obstetricians and Gynaecologists, London |
| Gustavus Athol Waterhouse | Australia | 29 July 1950 | Entomologist | "The butterflies of Australia", 1914 and "What butterfly is that? A guide to the butterflies of Australia", 1932 |
| Alexandrine Seager | Australia | 12 March 1950 | Businessperson | Founded the Cheer-Up Society to provide comfort and entertainment for World War One soldiers |
| Ted Theodore | Australia | 9 February 1950 | Politician | State president, Queensland Australian Workers' Union |

== Entering the public domain in the United States ==
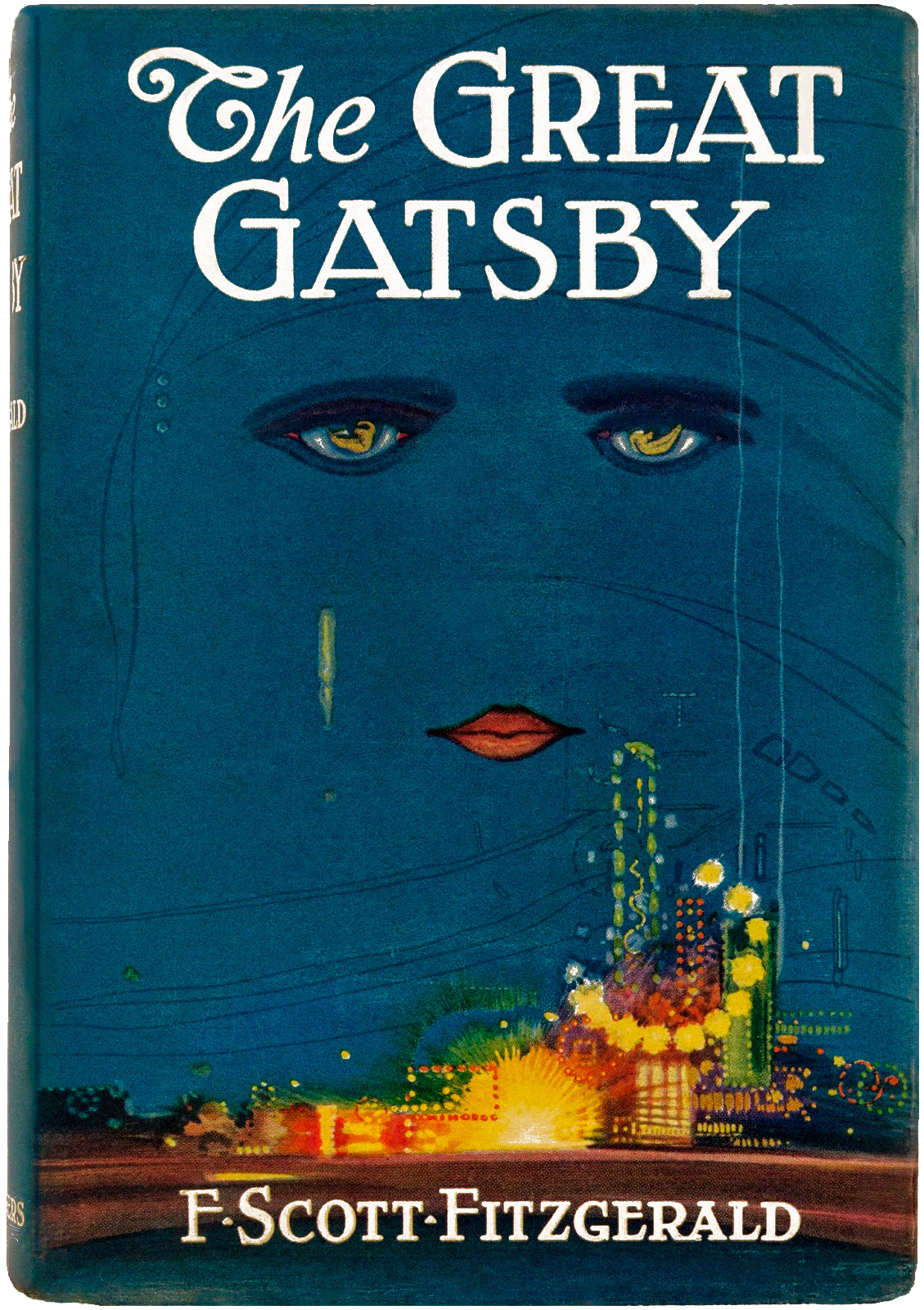
The Great Gatsby entered the public domain in the US in 2021.

Under the Copyright Term Extension Act, books published in 1925, films released in 1925, and other works published in 1925, entered the public domain in 2021. While sound recordings in general remained copyrighted (this was their last year before entering the public domain under the Music Modernization Act), all musical compositions published in 1925 entered the public domain in 2021. Additionally, unpublished works whose authors died in 1950 entered the public domain.

Notable books that entered the public domain in 2021 in the United States include The Great Gatsby by F. Scott Fitzgerald, Mrs Dalloway by Virginia Woolf, In Our Time by Ernest Hemingway, The Trial by Franz Kafka in its original German, An American Tragedy by Theodore Dreiser, Manhattan Transfer by John Dos Passos, The New Negro by Alain Locke (a collection of works from such writers as W. E. B. Du Bois, Countee Cullen, Langston Hughes, Zora Neale Hurston, Claude McKay, Jean Toomer, and Eric Walrond), Arrowsmith by Sinclair Lewis, The Secret of Chimneys by Agatha Christie, Those Barren Leaves by Aldous Huxley, The Painted Veil by W. Somerset Maugham, On the Trail of Negro Folk-Songs by Dorothy Scarborough, The Writing of Fiction by Edith Wharton, and A Daughter of the Samurai by Etsu Inagaki Sugimoto.

Notable films that entered the public domain include Harold Lloyd's The Freshman, The Merry Widow, Stella Dallas, Buster Keaton's Go West, His People, Lovers in Quarantine, Pretty Ladies, the original silent version of The Unholy Three, and the third Universal Monsters film The Phantom of the Opera. Notable songs that entered include Irving Berlin's song "Always", "Sweet Georgia Brown", George and Ira Gershwin's song "Looking for a Boy", Rodgers and Hart's song "Manhattan", "Ukulele Lady", and "Yes Sir, That's My Baby". Various songs by Gertrude "Ma" Rainey, Jelly Roll Morton, W. C. Handy, Duke Ellington, Fats Waller, Bessie Smith, Lovie Austin, Sidney Bechet, Fletcher Henderson, and Sippie Wallace also entered the public domain, as did Amy Beach's compositions The Singer and Song in the Hills.

== See also ==
- List of American films of 1925
- List of countries' copyright lengths
- Public Domain Day
- Creative Commons
- Public Domain
- Over 300 public domain authors available in Wikisource (any language), with descriptions from Wikidata
- 1920 in literature and 1970 in literature
