= 33 Revolutions per Minute (book) =

Non-fiction book

- First edition (UK)
- Author: Dorian Lynskey
- Language: English
- Genre: Non-fiction
- Publisher: Faber & Faber (UK); Ecco Press (US)
- Publication date: April 5, 2011
- Pages: 656
- ISBN: 978-0-061-67015-2
- OCLC: 641532418
- Dewey Decimal: 782.42
- LC Class: ML3780 .L97 2011

33 Revolutions per Minute: A History of Protest Songs, from Billie Holiday to Green Day is a 2011 non-fiction book written by music critic and journalist Dorian Lynskey. Written because he wished to document a "still-vital form of music", each of the book's 33 chapters describes the historical background, writing process, and influence of a notable protest song. The book begins with a chapter on the song "Strange Fruit", before moving from a discussion of protest music's origins to a broader discussion focusing on its expansion across countries and genres. 33 Revolutions per Minute has received generally positive reviews from critics, who praised its scope despite being "thin on critical insight".

== Background and publication ==
Dorian Lynskey is a British music critic and journalist who has written for publications like The Guardian, The Observer, and Q. In the epilogue of 33 Revolutions per Minute, Lynskey wrote how he initially began doing research into protest songs in order to document what he believed to be a "still-vital form of music". When selecting songs to cover, Lynskey noted in an interview that he first and foremost sought songs he enjoyed listening to, so that he would be willing to listen to them repeatedly. He also attempted to cast a wide net across genres and causes for protest, though he emphasized that the book was not meant to be a definitive list of protest songs and acknowledged that his selection of songs was "limited...to western pop music".

33 Revolutions per Minute was first released on April 5, 2011, being published by Faber & Faber in the United Kingdom and Ecco Press in the United States; an eBook was published the same year. In 2012, a French-language edition of the book was published by Payot et Rivages in Paris; in 2015, a Spanish-language edition of the book, and its eBook counterpart, were published by Malpaso Editorial in Barcelona.

== Synopsis ==
33 Revolutions per Minute consists of 33 chapters, in addition to a prologue, an epilogue, sources, and appendices. Each chapter details one notable protest song, including information about the song's influence, its writing process, and the historical background surrounding the song's release. Chapters are organized by chronological order, and split into five parts.

Part one (1939–1964) depicts the early years of protest music, and how it first intersected with popular music. Part two (1965–1973) demonstrates the continued evolution of protest music, with songs reflecting events like the Vietnam War and the black power movement. Part three (1973–1977) depicts various international scenes of protest music, used to illustrate its expansion outside the United States. Finally, parts four (1977–1987) and five (1989–2008) reflect on more modern examples of primarily American and British protest music, covering political scenes like opposition to the presidency of Ronald Reagan and the premiership of Margaret Thatcher, the 1984–1985 United Kingdom miners' strike, and the Iraq War.

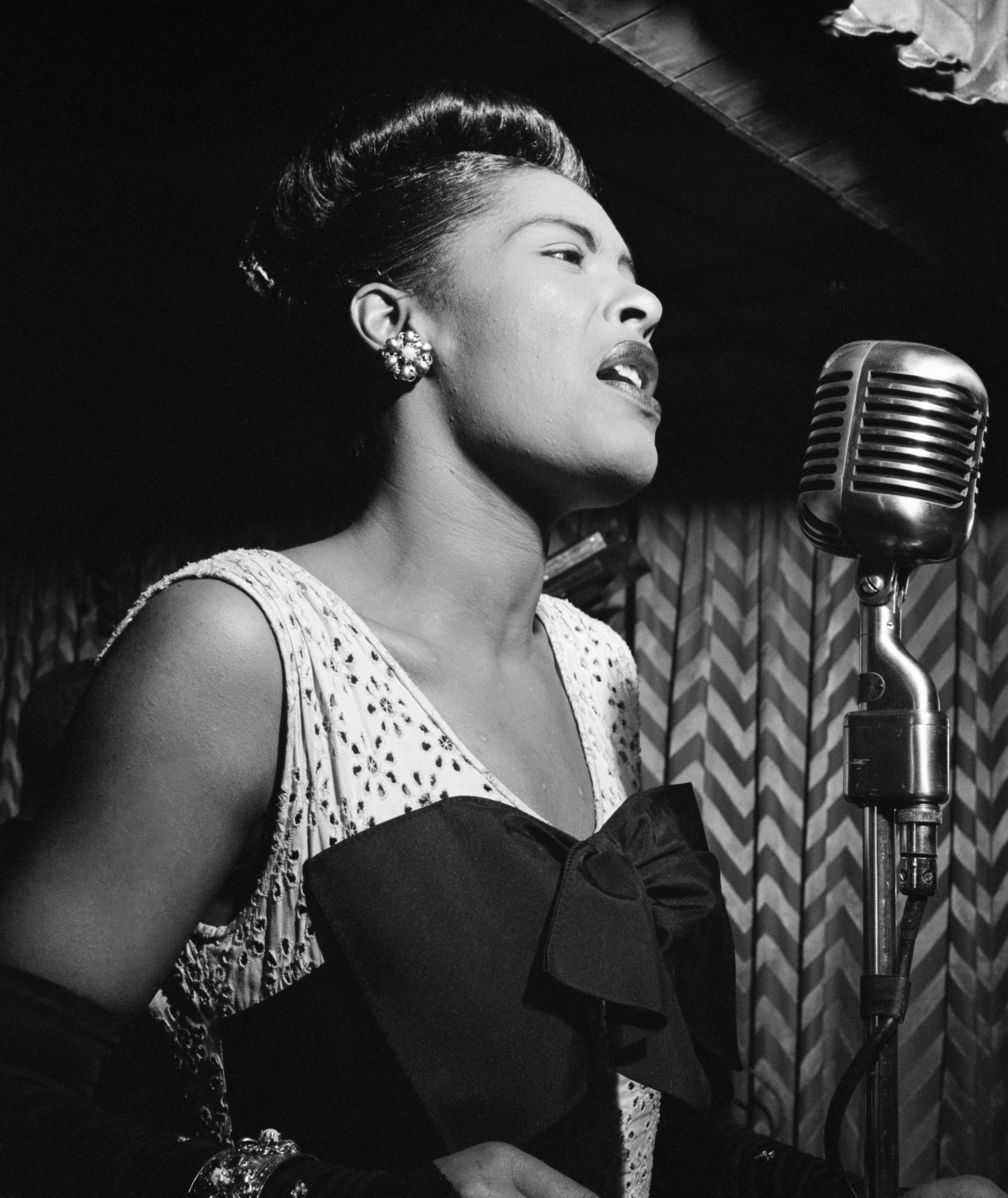
The first chapter of 33 Revolutions per Minute covers the history of "Strange Fruit" by Billie Holiday (pictured).

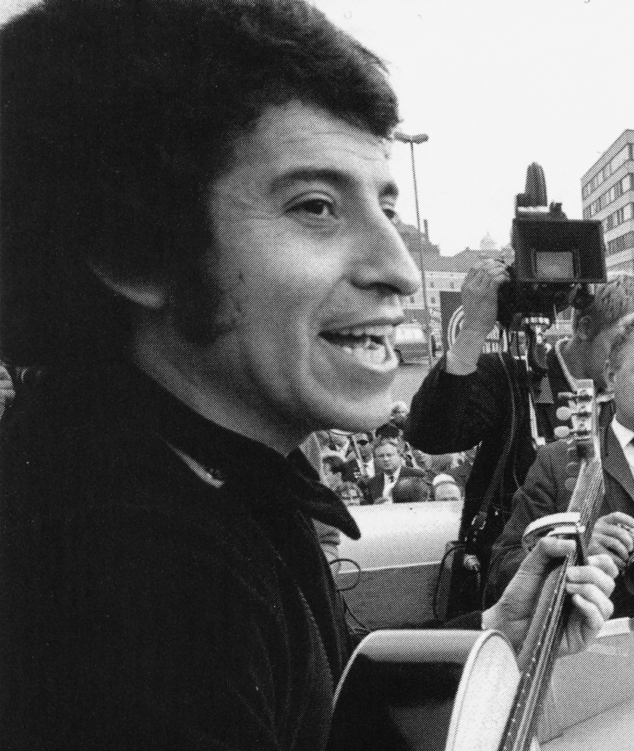
In the third section of 33 Revolutions per Minute, Lynskey tells the stories behind various protest songs outside the United States, including that of "Manifesto" by Víctor Jara (pictured).

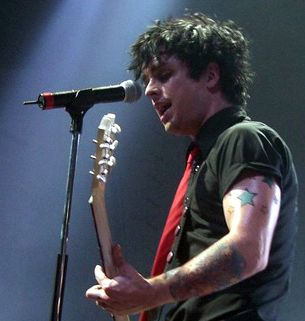
The final chapter of 33 Revolutions per Minute covers the song "American Idiot" by Green Day (frontman Billie Joe Armstrong pictured)

Chapters in 33 Revolutions per Minute
Part	Chapter	Song	Artist(s)
One (1939–1964)	1	"Strange Fruit"	Billie Holiday
One (1939–1964)	2	"This Land is Your Land"	Woody Guthrie
One (1939–1964)	3	"We Shall Overcome"	Zilphia Horton, Frank Hamilton, Guy Carawan, Pete Seeger
One (1939–1964)	4	"Masters of War"	Bob Dylan
One (1939–1964)	5	"Mississippi Goddam"	Nina Simone
Two (1965–1973)	6	"I-Feel-Like-I'm-Fixin'-to-Die"	Country Joe and the Fish
Two (1965–1973)	7	"Say It Loud – I'm Black and I'm Proud"	James Brown
Two (1965–1973)	8	"Give Peace a Chance"	Plastic Ono Band
Two (1965–1973)	9	"War"	Edwin Starr
Two (1965–1973)	10	"Ohio"	Crosby, Stills, Nash & Young
Two (1965–1973)	11	"The Revolution Will Not Be Televised"	Gil Scott-Heron
Two (1965–1973)	12	"Living for the City"	Stevie Wonder
Three (1973–1977)	13	"Manifesto"	Víctor Jara
Three (1973–1977)	14	"Zombie"	Fela Kuti and the Africa 70
Three (1973–1977)	15	"War Ina Babylon"	Max Romeo and the Upsetters
Four (1977–1987)	16	"White Riot"	The Clash
Four (1977–1987)	17	"I Was Born This Way"	Carl Bean
Four (1977–1987)	18	"Sonny's Lettah (Anti-Sus Poem)"	Linton Kwesi Johnson
Four (1977–1987)	19	"Holiday in Cambodia"	Dead Kennedys
Four (1977–1987)	20	"The Message"	Grandmaster Flash and the Furious Five, featuring Melle Mel and Duke Bootee
Four (1977–1987)	21	"How Does It Feel?"	Crass
Four (1977–1987)	22	"Two Tribes"	Frankie Goes to Hollywood
Four (1977–1987)	23	"Pride (In the Name of Love)"	U2
Four (1977–1987)	24	"Nelson Mandela"	The Special AKA
Four (1977–1987)	25	"Between the Wars"	Billy Bragg
Four (1977–1987)	26	"Exhuming McCarthy"	R.E.M.
Five (1989–2008)	27	"Fight the Power"	Public Enemy
Five (1989–2008)	28	"Her Jazz"	Huggy Bear
Five (1989–2008)	29	"Their Law"	The Prodigy, featuring Pop Will Eat Itself
Five (1989–2008)	30	"Of Walking Abortion"	Manic Street Preachers
Five (1989–2008)	31	"Sleep Now in the Fire"	Rage Against the Machine
Five (1989–2008)	32	"John Walker's Blues"	Steve Earle
Five (1989–2008)	33	"American Idiot"	Green Day

== Reception ==
33 Revolutions per Minute received generally positive reviews from critics, who praised its comprehensiveness despite being "thin on critical insight". Kirkus gave the book a starred review, writing how Lynskey "presents a difficult, risky art form in all its complexity" and commended his "complete command of the music and the events that sparked it". Vanessa Bush of Booklist similarly gave 33 Revolutions per Minute a starred review, praising the book for being "comprehensive and beautifully written". Sean Wilentz, writing for The New York Times, gave the book a positive review for its comprehensiveness and Lynskey's "crisp prose". However, Dwight Garner, also writing for The New York Times, gave 33 Revolutions per Minute a mixed review, criticized the book for being "mostly torpid and colorless" despite its wide selection of songs. In addition, Michael Azerrad, writing for The Wall Street Journal, criticized the book's lack of focus, noting that "most chapters devote only a few paragraphs to the song they're ostensibly about, then delve into deep, deep background".

Martin Chilton of The Telegraph praised the book for its scope and Lynskey's nuanced description of the musicians he covered. Dave Shiflett of The Washington Post similarly praised the book for Lynskey's balanced coverage, commenting that he "writes passionately and often admiringly but doesn't stint on the criticism", and particularly praised his coverage of Dylan. In contrast, Carolyn Kellogg of the Los Angeles Times criticized Lynskey's coverage of Dylan as shallow, and wrote that 33 Revolutions per Minute, despite its "robust" list of protest songs, lacked "a sense of what they're good for".

== See also ==
- Protest songs in the United States
- Music and politics
- The Ministry of Truth, another book by Dorian Lynskey
