= Panella (surname) =

Panella is a surname. Notable people with the surname include:

- Clementina Panella, Italian archaeologist
- Frank Panella (1878–1953), American composer
- Giovanni Bonifacio Panella (died 1417), Italian Roman Catholic prelate
- Jack Panella (born 1955), American judge
- Louis J. Panella (1881–1940), American musician, composer, and teacher
- Pasquale Panella (born 1950), Italian lyricist and writer
- Alfredo Panella (1896–?), Italian motorcycle racer

== See also ==
- Panelli, surname
