= Nineteen Eighty-Four =

1949 dystopian novel by George Orwell

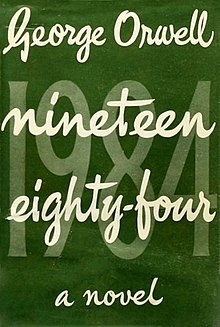
- First-edition cover
- Author: George Orwell
- Cover artist: Michael Kennard
- Language: English
- Genre: Dystopian; political fiction; social science fiction; speculative fiction
- Publisher: Secker & Warburg
- Publication date: 8 June 1949
- Publication place: United Kingdom
- Media type: Print (hardback and paperback)
- Pages: 328
- OCLC: 470015866
- Dewey Decimal: 823.912
- LC Class: PZ3.O793 Ni2
- Preceded by: Animal Farm

Nineteen Eighty-Four (also published as 1984) is a dystopian and speculative fiction novel by the English writer George Orwell. It was published on 8 June 1949 by Secker & Warburg as Orwell's ninth and final completed book. Thematically, it centres on totalitarianism, mass surveillance and repressive regimentation of people and behaviours. Nineteen Eighty-Four has often been regarded as a classic and has been acknowledged for its impact on 20th-century literature.

The story takes place in a fictional future. The year is believed to be 1984, but this is uncertain. Much of the world is in perpetual war. Great Britain, now known as Airstrip One, has become a province of the totalitarian superstate Oceania, which is led by Big Brother, a dictatorial leader supported by an intense cult of personality manufactured by the Party's Thought Police. The Party engages in omnipresent government surveillance and, through the Ministry of Truth, historical negationism and constant propaganda to persecute individuality and independent thinking. Orwell described his book as a "satire", and a display of the "perversions to which a centralised economy is liable", while also stating he believed "that something resembling it could arrive". The novel examines the role of truth and facts within societies and the ways in which they can be manipulated. Parallels have been drawn between the novel and real-world totalitarianism, mass surveillance and violations of freedom of expression, among other themes.

Nineteen Eighty-Four has become a classic literary example of dystopian and political fiction. It popularised "Orwellian" as an adjective, and many terms used in it have entered common usage, including "Big Brother", "doublethink", "Thought Police", "thoughtcrime", and "Newspeak", as well as the expression "2 + 2 = 5". Time magazine included it on its list of the 100 best English-language novels published from 1923 to 2005, and it was placed on the Modern Library's 100 Best Novels list, reaching number 13 on the editors' list and number 6 on the readers' list. In 2003 it was listed at number 8 on The Big Read survey by the BBC. In a poll of the greatest books of all time for The Guardian, the novel placed 16th. It has been adapted across media, most famously as a film in 1984 starring John Hurt, Suzanna Hamilton and Richard Burton.

== Plot summary ==
As the narrative opens on "April 4th, 1984", a date whose validity is questioned by the protagonist, the world has been ravaged for decades by global war, civil conflict and revolution. What was once the island of Great Britain is now Airstrip One, a province of Oceania, one of the three totalitarian super-states that rule the world. It is ruled by "the Party" under the ideology of "Ingsoc", a Newspeak shortening of "English Socialism". Also present is the mysterious leader Big Brother, about whom there is an intense cult of personality. The Party brutally purges anyone who does not fully conform to their regime, using the Thought Police and constant surveillance through telescreens (two-way televisions), cameras and hidden microphones. Those who fall out of favour with the Party become "unpersons", with all evidence of their existence destroyed.

Winston Smith is a member of the Outer Party, working at the Ministry of Truth in London, where he rewrites historical records to conform to the state's ever-changing version of history. Winston revises past editions of The Times, while the original documents are destroyed after being dropped into ducts known as memory holes, which lead to an immense furnace. He secretly opposes the Party's rule and dreams of rebellion, despite knowing that he is already a "thought-criminal" and is likely to be caught one day.

While in a prole neighbourhood, he meets Mr Charrington, the owner of an antiques shop, and buys a diary where he writes criticisms of the Party and Big Brother. To his dismay, when he visits a prole quarter, he discovers they have no political consciousness. As he works in the Ministry of Truth, he observes Julia, a young woman maintaining the novel-writing machines at the ministry. Winston suspects she is a spy and develops an intense hatred of her. He vaguely suspects that O'Brien, a member of the Inner Party and a superior of his, is part of an enigmatic underground resistance movement known as the Brotherhood, formed by Big Brother's reviled political rival, Emmanuel Goldstein.

One day, Julia discreetly hands Winston a love note, and the two begin a secret affair. Julia explains that she also loathes the Party, but Winston observes that she is politically apathetic and uninterested in overthrowing the regime. Initially meeting in the country, they later meet in a rented room above Mr Charrington's shop. During the affair, Winston remembers the disappearance of his family during the civil war of the 1950s and his tense relationship with his estranged wife Katharine. Weeks later, O'Brien invites Winston to his flat, where he introduces himself as a member of the Brotherhood and sends Winston a copy of The Theory and Practice of Oligarchical Collectivism by Goldstein.

Meanwhile, during the nation's Hate Week, Oceania's enemy suddenly changes from Eurasia to Eastasia, which goes mostly unnoticed. Winston is recalled to the Ministry to assist in making the necessary revisions to the records. Winston and Julia read parts of Goldstein's book, which explains how the Party maintains power, the true meanings of its slogans, and the concept of perpetual war. It argues that the Party can be overthrown if the proles rise against it. However, Winston never gets the opportunity to read the chapter that explains why the Party took power and is motivated to maintain it.

Winston and Julia are captured when Mr Charrington is revealed to be an undercover Thought Police agent, and they are separated and imprisoned at the Ministry of Love. O'Brien also shows himself to be a member of the Thought Police and a participant in a false flag operation that targets political dissidents within the Party. Over several months, Winston is starved and relentlessly tortured to bring his beliefs in line with the Party. O'Brien tells Winston that he will never know whether the Brotherhood actually exists and that Goldstein's book was written collaboratively by him and other Party members; furthermore, O'Brien reveals to Winston that the Party sees power not as a means but as an end, and the ultimate purpose of the Party is to seek power entirely for its own sake. For the final stage of re-education, O'Brien takes Winston to Room 101, which contains each prisoner's worst fear. When confronted with rat torture, Winston begs for the method to be used on Julia instead of him.

Winston is released into public life and continues to frequent the Chestnut Tree café. He encounters Julia, and both reveal that they have betrayed each other and are no longer in love. Back in the café, a news alert celebrates Oceania's supposed massive victory over Eurasian armies in Africa. Winston finally accepts that he loves Big Brother.

=== Epilogue ===
The novel includes an epilogue, an appendix of around 1,000 words, titled Principles of Newspeak, and written in the voice of the (or possibly a second) narrator, using counterfactual past-subjunctive tense. It is referred to in a footnote to the book's seventh paragraph. Some critics have read it as implying the failure of Newspeak to become dominant and the collapse of The Party some years after the events of the novel, describing it as a "happy ending". Orwell wrote to his literary agent in 1949, urging that the appendix be retained for the American edition.

== Characters ==
=== Main characters ===
- Winston Smith: the 39-year-old protagonist who is a phlegmatic everyman harbouring thoughts of rebellion and is curious about the Party's power and the past before the Revolution.
- Julia: Winston's lover, who publicly espouses Party doctrine as a member of the fanatical Junior Anti-Sex League. Julia enjoys her small acts of rebellion and has no interest in giving up her lifestyle.
- O'Brien: an Inner Party official who is secretly a member of the Thought Police. He poses as a member of the Brotherhood, the counter-revolutionary resistance, to catch Winston.
- Big Brother and Emmanuel Goldstein never physically appear, but are important to the plot and have a significant role in the worldbuilding.
  - Big Brother: the leader and figurehead of the Party that rules Oceania. A deep cult of personality is formed around him. It is not revealed whether he really exists.
  - Emmanuel Goldstein: ostensibly a former leading figure in the Party who became the counter-revolutionary leader of the Brotherhood, and author of the book The Theory and Practice of Oligarchical Collectivism. Goldstein is the symbolic enemy of the state—the national nemesis who ideologically unites the people of Oceania with the Party, especially during the Two Minutes Hate and other forms of fear-mongering. However, O'Brien tells Winston the book was actually written by members of the Inner Party including himself thus making Goldstein's actual existence at least questionable.

=== Secondary characters ===
- Aaronson, Jones, and Rutherford: former members of the Inner Party whom Winston vaguely remembers as among the original leaders of the Revolution, long before he had heard of Big Brother. They confessed to treasonable conspiracies with foreign powers, were released, were rearrested and executed during the political purges of the 1960s. In between their confessions and executions, Winston saw them drinking in the Chestnut Tree Café — two with broken noses, suggesting that they had been subjected to at least some degree of torture. Later, at work, Winston sees newspaper evidence contradicting their confessions but drops it into a memory hole. Eleven years later, he is confronted with the same photograph during his interrogation but O'Brien destroys it and immediately denies having seen it.
- Ampleforth: Winston's one-time Records Department colleague who was imprisoned for leaving the word "God" in a poem by Rudyard Kipling as he could not find another rhyme for "rod"; (Note: This may be a reference to "McAndrew's Hymn", which includes the lines "From coupler-flange to spindle-guide I see Thy Hand, O God— / Predestination in the stride o' yon connectin'-rod".) Winston encounters him at the Ministry of Love. Ampleforth is a dreamer and intellectual who takes pleasure in his work, and respects poetry and language, traits which cause him to inevitably incur disfavour from the Party.
- Mr Charrington: an undercover officer of the Thought Police masquerading as a kind and sympathetic antiques dealer among the proles.
- Katharine Smith: the emotionally indifferent wife whom Winston "can't get rid of". Despite disliking sexual intercourse, Katharine married Winston because it was their "duty to the Party". Although she was a "goodthinkful" ideologue, they separated because the couple could not conceive children. Divorce is not permitted but couples who cannot have children may live separately. For much of the story Winston lives in vague hope that Katharine may die or could be "got rid of" so that he may marry Julia. He regrets not having killed her by pushing her over the edge of a quarry when he had the chance many years previously.
- The Parsons family:
  - Tom Parsons: Winston's naïve neighbour, and an ideal member of the Outer Party: an uneducated, suggestible man who is utterly loyal to the Party, and fully believes in its perfect image. He is socially active and participates in the Party activities for his social class. He is friendly towards Smith and punishes his bullying son for firing a catapult at Winston. Later, as a prisoner, Winston sees Parsons imprisoned in the Ministry of Love, after his young daughter reported him to the Thought Police for reportedly speaking against Big Brother in his sleep. Even this does not dampen Parsons's belief in the Party — he says he could do "good work" in the hard labour camps.
  - Mrs Parsons: Parsons's wife is a wan and hapless woman who, even before her husband's arrest, is justifiably afraid of her own children.
  - The Parsons children: a nine-year-old son and seven-year-old daughter. Both are members of the Spies, a youth organisation that focuses on indoctrinating children with Party ideals and training them to report any suspected incidents of unorthodoxy. They represent the new generation of Oceanians, the model society envisioned by the Inner Party with no memory of life before Big Brother and no family ties or emotional sentiment.
- Syme: Winston's colleague at the Ministry of Truth, a lexicographer involved in compiling a new edition of the Newspeak dictionary. Although he is enthusiastic about his work and support for the Party, Winston notes, "He is too intelligent. He sees too clearly and speaks too plainly." Winston predicts, correctly, that Syme will become an unperson.

== Writing and publication ==
=== Conception ===
The Orwell Archive at University College London contains undated notes about ideas that evolved into Nineteen Eighty-Four. The notebooks have been deemed "unlikely to have been completed later than January 1944", and "there is a strong suspicion that some of the material in them dates back to the early part of the war".

In one letter from 1948 Orwell claims to have "first thought of [the book] in 1943", while in another he says he thought of it in 1944 and cites the Tehran Conference in 1943 as inspiration: "What it is really meant to do is to discuss the implications of dividing the world up into 'Zones of Influence' (I thought of it in 1944 as a result of the Tehran Conference), and in addition to indicate by parodying them the intellectual implications of totalitarianism". Orwell had toured Austria in May 1945 and observed manoeuvring he thought would probably lead to separate Soviet and Allied Zones of Occupation.

In January 1944, the Russian literary historian Gleb Struve introduced Orwell to Yevgeny Zamyatin's 1924 dystopian novel, We. In his response Orwell expressed an interest in the genre, and informed Struve that he had begun writing ideas for one of his own, "that may get written sooner or later". In 1946 Orwell wrote about the 1931 dystopian novel Brave New World by Aldous Huxley in his article "Freedom and Happiness" for the Tribune, and noted similarities to We. By this time Orwell had scored a critical and commercial hit with his 1945 political satire, Animal Farm, which raised his profile. For a follow-up he decided to produce a dystopian work of his own.

=== Writing ===
In a June 1944 meeting with Fredric Warburg, co-founder of his British publisher Secker & Warburg, shortly before the release of Animal Farm, Orwell announced that he had written the first 12 pages of his new novel. As he could then only earn a living from journalism, he predicted the book would not see a release before 1947. Progress was slow; by the end of September 1945 Orwell had written some 50 pages. Orwell became disenchanted with the restrictions and pressures involved with journalism and grew to detest city life in London. He suffered from bronchiectasis and a lesion in one lung; the harsh winter worsened his health.

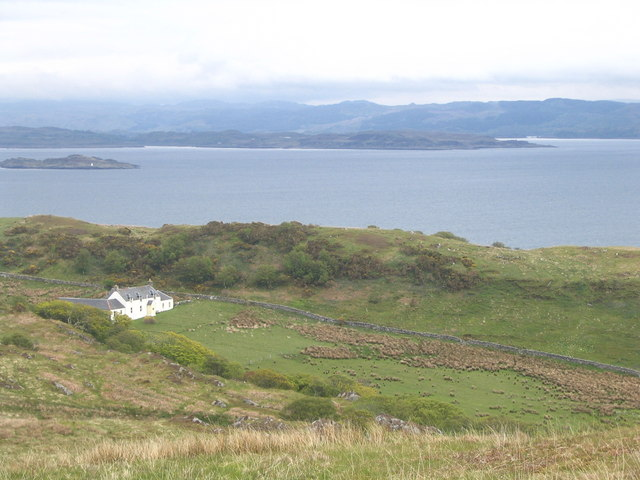
The novel was completed at Barnhill, Jura.

In May 1946, Orwell arrived on the Scottish island of Jura. He had wanted to retreat to a Hebridean island for several years; David Astor recommended he should stay at Barnhill, a remote farmhouse on the island that his family owned, with no electricity or hot water. Here Orwell intermittently drafted and finished Nineteen Eighty-Four. His first stay lasted until October 1946, and during it he made little progress on the few already completed pages, and for a period of three months he did not work on it at all.

After spending the winter in London, Orwell returned to Jura; in May 1947 he reported to Warburg that despite progress being slow and difficult, he was roughly a third of the way through. He sent his "ghastly mess" of a first-draft manuscript to London, where Miranda Christen volunteered to type a clean version.

Orwell's health worsened further in September, and he was confined to his bed with inflammation of the lungs. He lost almost two stone (28 pounds or 12.7 kg) in weight and had recurring night sweats, but he decided not to see a doctor and continued writing. On 7 November 1947, he completed the first draft in bed, and subsequently travelled to East Kilbride near Glasgow for medical treatment at Hairmyres Hospital, where a specialist confirmed a chronic and infectious case of tuberculosis.

Orwell was discharged in the summer of 1948, after which he returned to Jura and produced a full second draft of Nineteen Eighty-Four, which he finished in November. He asked Warburg to have someone come to Barnhill and retype the manuscript, which was so untidy that the task was only considered possible if Orwell were present, as only he could understand it. The previous volunteer had left the country and no other could be found at short notice, so an impatient Orwell retyped it himself at a rate of roughly 4,000 words a day during bouts of fever and bloody coughing fits. On 4 December 1948, Orwell sent the finished manuscript to Secker & Warburg and left Barnhill for good in January 1949. He recovered at a sanitarium in the Cotswolds.

=== Title ===
Shortly before completion of the second draft, Orwell vacillated between two titles: The Last Man in Europe, an early title, and Nineteen Eighty-Four. Warburg suggested the latter, which he took to be a more commercially viable choice. There has been a theory – doubted by Dorian Lynskey (author of a 2019 book about Nineteen Eighty-Four) – that 1984 was chosen simply as an inversion of the year 1948, the year in which it was being completed. Lynskey says the idea was "first suggested by Orwell's US publisher", and it was also mentioned by Christopher Hitchens in his introduction to the 2003 edition of Animal Farm and 1984, which also notes that the date was meant to give "an immediacy and urgency to the menace of totalitarian rule". However, Lynskey does not believe the inversion theory:

This idea ... seems far too cute for such a serious book. ... Scholars have raised other possibilities. [His wife] Eileen wrote a poem for her old school's centenary called 'End of the Century: 1984.' G. K. Chesterton's 1904 political satire The Napoleon of Notting Hill, which mocks the art of prophecy, opens in 1984. The year is also a significant date in The Iron Heel. But all of these connections are exposed as no more than coincidences by the early drafts of the novel ... First he wrote 1980, then 1982, and only later 1984. The most fateful date in literature was a late amendment.

The novel and its title resonate particularly with the poem End of Century, 1984, written by George Orwell’s first wife, Eileen Blair.

Published in 1934 to mark the fiftieth anniversary of her childhood school, Sunderland High School, the poem envisions the world in 1984, fifty years to the future. At the time, Eileen was twenty-nine, keenly aware of the rise of European fascism and was concerned about the future of science and the arts.

Eileen served as Orwell's typist and her influence on his style is analyzed in the books Eileen: The Making of Georges Orwell (2020) by Sylvia Topp and Wifedom: Mrs Orwell’s Invisible Life (2023) by Anna Funder. It has been suggested that the novel's title was a tribute to his wife, who died in 1945.

=== Publication ===
A 1947 draft manuscript of the first page of Nineteen Eighty-Four, showing the editorial development

In the run up to publication Orwell called the novel "a beastly book" and expressed some disappointment towards it, thinking it would have been improved had he not been so ill. This was typical of Orwell, who had talked down his other books shortly before their release. Nevertheless, it was enthusiastically received by Secker & Warburg, who acted quickly; before Orwell had left Jura he rejected their proposed blurb that portrayed it as "a thriller mixed up with a love story". He also refused a proposal from the American Book of the Month Club to release an edition without the appendix and chapter on Goldstein's book, a decision which Warburg claimed cut off about £40,000 in sales.

Nineteen Eighty-Four was published on 8 June 1949 in Britain; Orwell predicted earnings of around £500. A first print of 25,575 copies was followed by a further 5,000 copies in March and August 1950. It had the most immediate impact in the United States, following its release there on 13 June 1949 by Harcourt Brace, & Co. An initial print of 20,000 copies was quickly followed by another 10,000 on 1 July, and again on 7 September. By 1970, over 8 million copies had been sold in the US, and in 1984, it topped the country's all-time best seller list.

In June 1952 Orwell's widow, Sonia Brownell, sold the sole remaining manuscript at a charity auction for £50. The draft remains the only surviving literary manuscript from Orwell, and is held at the John Hay Library at Brown University in Providence, Rhode Island, US.

=== Variant English-language editions ===
In the original published UK and US editions of Nineteen Eighty-Four, numerous small variations in the text exist, the US edition altering Orwell's agreed edit of the text as was typical of publishing practices of the time in regard to spelling and punctuation, as well as some small edits and phrasings. While Orwell rejected a proposed book club edition which would see substantial sections of the book removed, these minor changes passed somewhat under the radar. Other more significant revisions and variant texts also exist, however.

In 1984, Peter Davison edited Nineteen Eighty-Four: The Facsimile of the Extant Manuscript, published by Secker and Warburg in Britain and Harcourt-Brace-Jovanovich in the United States. This reproduced, page-for-page, Brownell's copy of the original manuscript in facsimiles, as well as a complete typeset versions of that text, complete with Orwell's holograph and typewritten pages, and handwritten amendments and corrections. The book had a preface by Daniel Segal. It has been reprinted in various international editions with translated introductions and notes, and reprinted in English in limited edition formats.

In 1997, Davison produced a definitive text of Nineteen Eighty Four as part of Secker's 20-volume definitive edition of the Complete Works of George Orwell. This edition removed errors and reversed editorial changes in the original editions made without Orwell's oversight, all based on detailed reference to Orwell's original manuscript and notes. This text has gone on to be reprinted in various subsequent paperback editions, including one with an introduction by the novelist Thomas Pynchon, without obvious note that it is a revised text, and has been translated as an unexpurgated version of text.

In 2021, Polygon published Nineteen Eighty Four: The Jura Edition, with an introduction by Alex Massie.

== Sources for literary motifs ==
Nineteen Eighty-Four uses themes from life in the Soviet Union and wartime life in Great Britain as sources for many of its motifs. Some time at an unspecified date after the first American publication of the book, the producer Sidney Sheldon wrote to Orwell interested in adapting the novel to the Broadway stage. Orwell wrote in a letter to Sheldon (to whom he would sell the US stage rights) that his basic goal with Nineteen Eighty-Four was imagining the consequences of Stalinist government ruling British society:

[Nineteen Eighty-Four] was based chiefly on communism, because that is the dominant form of totalitarianism, but I was trying chiefly to imagine what communism would be like if it were firmly rooted in the English speaking countries, and was no longer a mere extension of the Russian Foreign Office.

According to Orwell's biographer D. J. Taylor Orwell's A Clergyman's Daughter (1935) has "essentially the same plot of Nineteen Eighty-Four ... It's about somebody who is spied upon, and eavesdropped upon, and oppressed by vast exterior forces they can do nothing about. It makes an attempt at rebellion and then has to compromise".

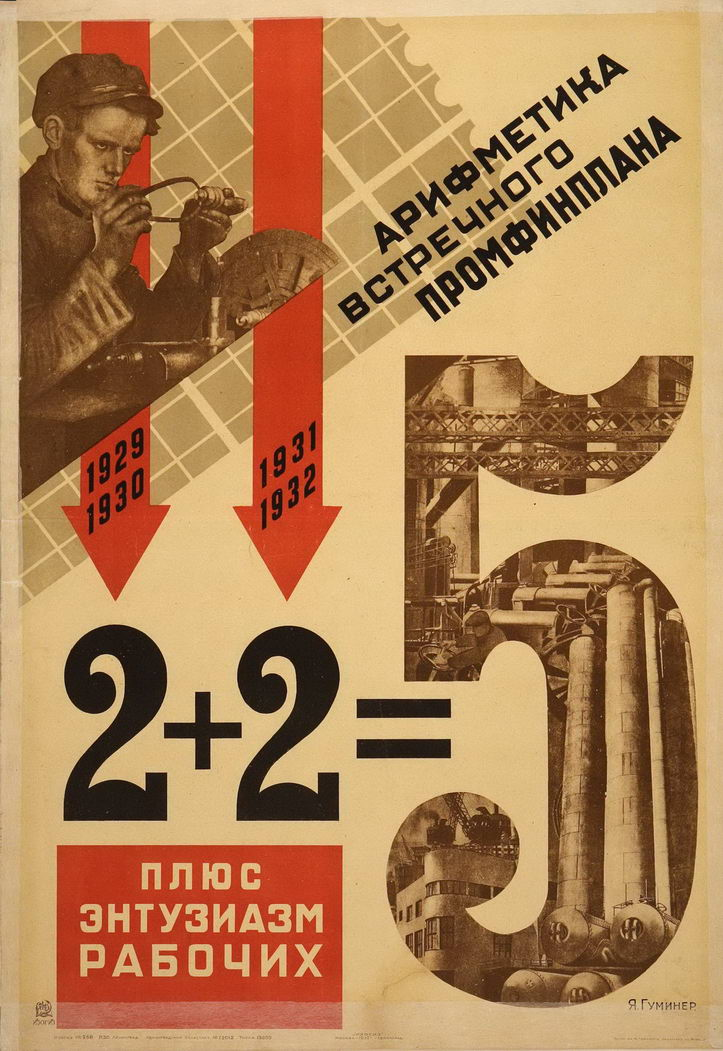
A 1931 poster for the first five-year plan of the Soviet Union by Yakov Guminer reading "The arithmetic of an industrial-financial counter-plan: 2 + 2 plus the enthusiasm of the workers = 5"

The statement "2 + 2 = 5", used to torment Winston Smith during his interrogation, was a communist party slogan from the second five-year plan, which encouraged fulfilment of the five-year plan in four years. The slogan was seen in electric lights on Moscow house-fronts, billboards and elsewhere.

The switch of Oceania's allegiance from Eastasia to Eurasia and the subsequent rewriting of history ("Oceania was at war with Eastasia: Oceania had always been at war with Eastasia. A large part of the political literature of five years was now completely obsolete"; ch 9) is evocative of the Soviet Union's changing relations with Nazi Germany. The two nations were open and frequently vehement critics of each other until the signing of the 1939 Treaty of Non-Aggression. Thereafter, and continuing until the Nazi invasion of the Soviet Union in 1941, no criticism of Germany was allowed in the Soviet press, and all references to prior party lines stopped—including in the majority of non-Russian communist parties who tended to follow the Russian line. Orwell had criticised the Communist Party of Great Britain for supporting the Treaty in his essays for Betrayal of the Left (1941). "The Hitler-Stalin pact of August 1939 reversed the Soviet Union's stated foreign policy. It was too much for many of the fellow-travellers like Gollancz [Orwell's sometime publisher] who had put their faith in a strategy of construction Popular Front governments and the peace bloc between Russia, Britain and France."

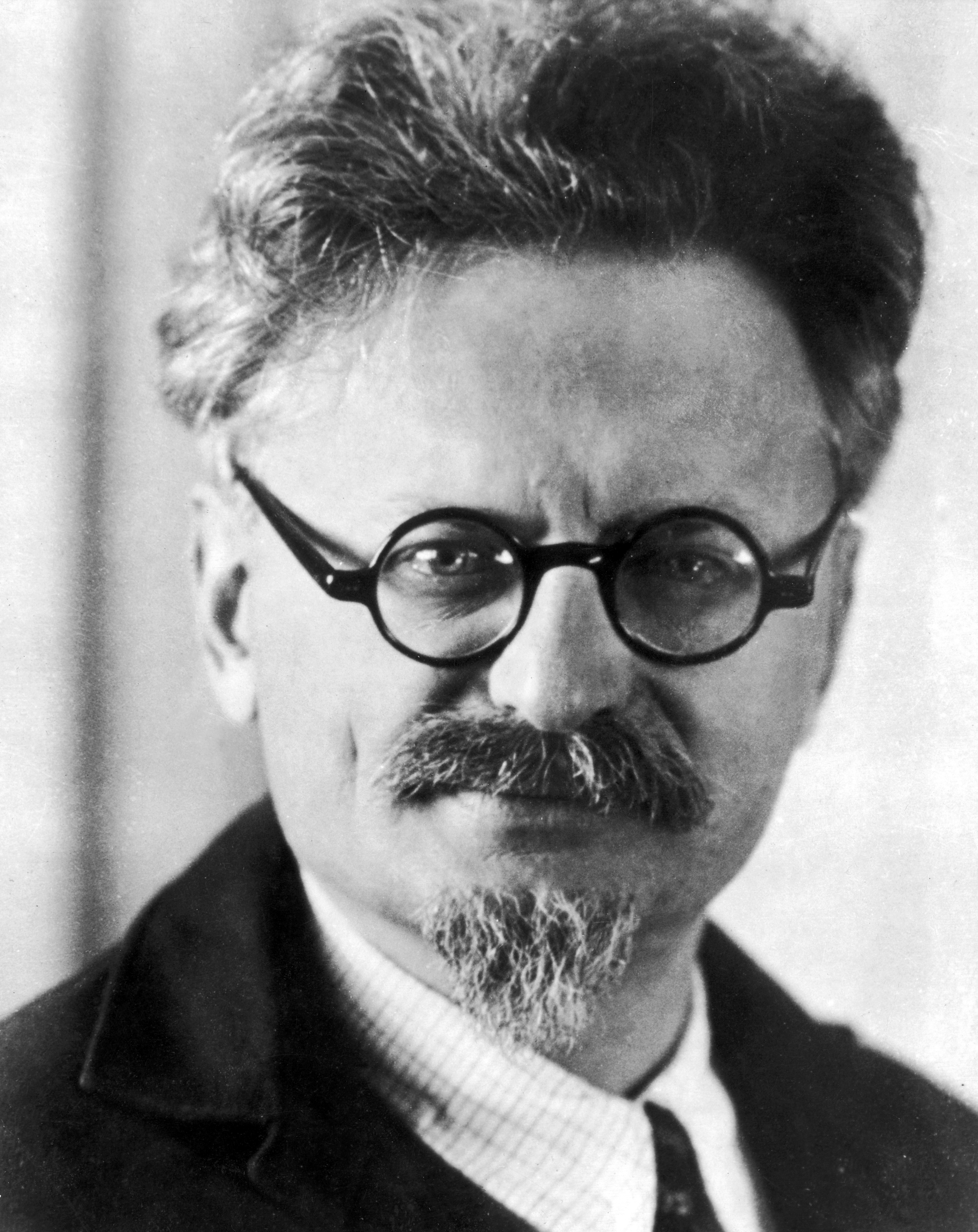
Leon Trotsky

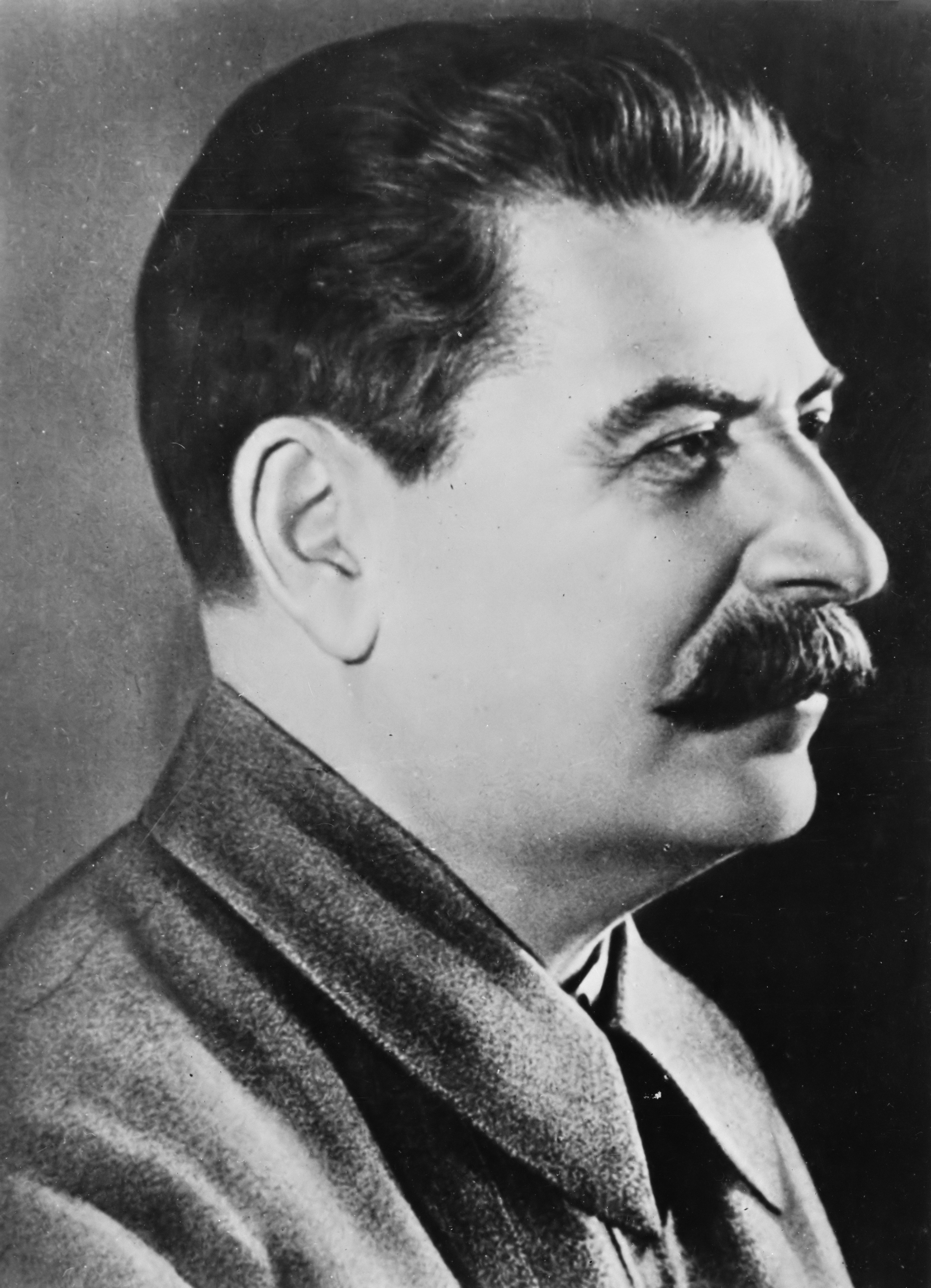
Joseph Stalin

Descriptions of Emmanuel Goldstein and Big Brother evoke Leon Trotsky and Joseph Stalin respectively.

The description of Emmanuel Goldstein, with a "small, goatee beard", evokes the image of Leon Trotsky. The film of Goldstein during the Two Minutes Hate is described as showing him being transformed into a bleating sheep. This image was used in a propaganda film during the Kino-eye period of Soviet film, which showed Trotsky transforming into a goat. (Trotsky was a formerly high-ranking party official who was ostracised and then wrote a book criticising party rule, The Revolution Betrayed, published in 1936.)

The omnipresent images of Big Brother, a man described as having a moustache, bears resemblance to the cult of personality built up around Joseph Stalin.

The news in Oceania emphasised production figures, just as it did in the Soviet Union, where record-setting in factories (by "Heroes of Socialist Labour") was especially glorified. The best known of these was Alexei Stakhanov, who purportedly set a record for coal mining in 1935.

The tortures of the Ministry of Love evoke the procedures used by the NKVD in their interrogations, including beatings, deprivation, and torture through the use of their greatest fear.

The random bombing of Airstrip One is based on the area bombing of London by Buzz bombs and the V-2 rocket in 1944–1945.

The Thought Police is based on the NKVD, which arrested people for "anti-Soviet" remarks.

The confessions of the "Thought Criminals" Rutherford, Aaronson and Jones are based on the show trials of the 1930s, which included fabricated confessions by the prominent Bolsheviks Nikolai Bukharin, Grigory Zinoviev, and Lev Kamenev to the effect that they were being paid by the Nazi government to undermine the Soviet regime under Leon Trotsky's direction.

The song "Under the Spreading Chestnut Tree" ("Under the spreading chestnut tree, I sold you, and you sold me") was based on an old English song called "Go no more a-rushing" ("Under the spreading chestnut tree, Where I knelt upon my knee, We were as happy as could be, 'Neath the spreading chestnut tree."). The song was published as early as 1891. The song was a popular camp song in the 1920s, sung with corresponding movements (like touching one's chest when singing "chest", and touching one's head when singing "nut"). Glenn Miller recorded the song in 1939.

The "Hates" (Two Minutes Hate and Hate Week) were inspired by the constant rallies sponsored by party organs throughout the Stalinist period. These were often short pep-talks given to workers before their shifts began (Two Minutes Hate), but could also last for days, as in the annual celebrations of the anniversary of the October Revolution (Hate Week).

Orwell fictionalised "newspeak", "doublethink" and "Ministry of Truth" based on both the Soviet press, and British wartime usage, such as "Miniform". In particular, he adapted Soviet ideological discourse constructed to ensure that public statements could not be questioned.

Winston Smith's job, "revising history" (and the "unperson" motif) are based on censorship of images in the Soviet Union, which airbrushed images of "fallen" people from group photographs and removed references to them in books and newspapers. In one well-known example, the second edition of the Great Soviet Encyclopedia had an article about Lavrentiy Beria. After his fall from power and execution, subscribers received a letter from the editor instructing them to cut out and destroy the three-page article on Beria and paste in its place enclosed replacement pages expanding the adjacent articles on F. W. Bergholz, the Bering Sea and Bishop Berkeley.

Big Brother's "Orders of the Day" were inspired by Stalin's regular wartime orders, called by the same name. A small collection of the more political of these have been published (together with his wartime speeches) in English as On the Great Patriotic War of the Soviet Union by Joseph Stalin. Like Big Brother's orders of the day, Stalin's frequently lauded heroic individuals, like Comrade Ogilvy, the fictitious hero Winston Smith invented to "rectify" (fabricate) a Big Brother Order of the day.

The Ingsoc slogan "Our new, happy life", repeated from telescreens, evokes Stalin's 1935 statement, which became a CPSU slogan, "Life has become better, Comrades; life has become more cheerful."

In 1940, the Argentine writer Jorge Luis Borges published "Tlön, Uqbar, Orbis Tertius", which describes the invention by a "benevolent secret society" of a world that would seek to remake human language and reality along human-invented lines. The story concludes with an appendix describing the success of the project. Borges' story addresses similar themes of epistemology, language and history to 1984.

The First World War inspired themes in Orwell's novel. For example, the phrase "we are the dead" is from the World War I poem "In Flanders Fields" by John McCrae, spoken by the corpse of a soldier on a battlefield.

During the Second World War Orwell believed British democracy as it existed before 1939 would not survive; the question being, "Would it end via Fascist coup d'état from above or via Socialist revolution from below?" Later he admitted that events proved him wrong: "What really matters is that I fell into the trap of assuming that 'the war and the revolution are inseparable'."

In his 1946 essay "Why I Write", Orwell explains that the serious works he wrote since the Spanish Civil War (1936–39) were "written, directly or indirectly, against totalitarianism and for democratic socialism". Nineteen Eighty-Four is a cautionary tale about revolution betrayed by totalitarian defenders previously proposed in Homage to Catalonia (1938) and Animal Farm (1945), while Coming Up for Air (1939) celebrates the personal and political freedoms lost in Nineteen Eighty-Four (1949). The biographer Michael Shelden notes Orwell's Edwardian childhood at Henley-on-Thames as the golden country; being bullied at St Cyprian's School as his empathy with victims; his life in the Indian Imperial Police in Burma and the techniques of violence, and wartime censorship in the BBC as capricious authority.

Other influences include Darkness at Noon (1940) and The Yogi and the Commissar (1945) by Arthur Koestler; The Iron Heel (1908) by Jack London; 1920: Dips into the Near Future by John A. Hobson; Brave New World (1932) by Aldous Huxley; We (1921) by Yevgeny Zamyatin which he reviewed in 1946; and The Managerial Revolution (1940) by James Burnham predicting perpetual war among three totalitarian superstates. Orwell told the writer Jacintha Buddicom that he would write a novel stylistically like A Modern Utopia (1905) by H. G. Wells.

Extrapolating from the Second World War, the novel's pastiche parallels the politics and rhetoric at war's end—the changed alliances at the "Cold War's" (1945–91) beginning; the Ministry of Truth derives from the BBC's overseas service, controlled by the Ministry of Information during the two World Wars; Room 101 derives from a conference room at BBC Broadcasting House; the Senate House of the University of London, containing the Ministry of Information is the architectural inspiration for the Minitrue; the post-war decrepitude derives from the socio-political life of the UK and the US, i.e., the impoverished Britain of 1948 losing its Empire despite newspaper-reported imperial triumph; and war ally but peace-time foe, Soviet Russia became Eurasia.

The term "English Socialism" has precedents in Orwell's wartime writings; in the essay "The Lion and the Unicorn: Socialism and the English Genius" (1941), he said that "the war and the revolution are inseparable... the fact that we are at war has turned Socialism from a textbook word into a realisable policy"—because Britain's superannuated social class system hindered the war effort and only a socialist economy would defeat Adolf Hitler. Given the middle class's grasping this, they too would abide socialist revolution and that only reactionary Britons would oppose it, thus limiting the force revolutionaries would need to take power. An English Socialism would come about which "will never lose touch with the tradition of compromise and the belief in a law that is above the State. It will shoot traitors, but it will give them a solemn trial beforehand and occasionally it will acquit them. It will crush any open revolt promptly and cruelly, but it will interfere very little with the spoken and written word."

In the world of Nineteen Eighty-Four "English Socialism" (or "Ingsoc" in Newspeak) is a totalitarian ideology unlike the English revolution he foresaw. Comparison of the wartime essay "The Lion and the Unicorn" with Nineteen Eighty-Four shows that he perceived a Big Brother regime as a perversion of his cherished socialist ideals and English Socialism. Thus, Oceania is a corruption of the British Empire he believed would evolve "into a federation of Socialist states, like a looser and freer version of the Union of Soviet Republics".

== Themes ==
=== Nationalism ===
Nineteen Eighty-Four expands upon the subjects summarised in Orwell's essay "Notes on Nationalism" about the lack of vocabulary needed to explain the unrecognised phenomena behind certain political forces. In Nineteen Eighty-Four, the Party's artificial, minimalist language 'Newspeak' addresses the matter.

- Positive nationalism: For instance, Oceanians' perpetual love for Big Brother. Orwell argues in the essay that ideologies such as Neo-Toryism and Celtic nationalism are defined by their obsessive sense of loyalty to some entity.
- Negative nationalism: For instance, Oceanians' perpetual hatred for Emmanuel Goldstein. Orwell argues in the essay that ideologies such as Trotskyism and antisemitism are defined by their obsessive hatred of some entity.
- Transferred nationalism: For instance, when Oceania's enemy changes, an orator makes a change mid-sentence, and the crowd instantly transfers its hatred to the new enemy. Orwell argues that ideologies such as Stalinism and redirected feelings of racial animus and class superiority among wealthy intellectuals exemplify this. Transferred nationalism swiftly redirects emotions from one power unit to another. In the novel, it happens during Hate Week, a Party rally against the original enemy. The crowd goes wild and destroys the posters that are now against their new friend, and many say that they must be the act of an agent of their new enemy and former friend. Many of the crowd must have put up the posters before the rally but think that the state of affairs had always been the case.

O'Brien concludes: "The object of persecution is persecution. The object of torture is torture. The object of power is power."

=== Futurology ===
In the novel O'Brien describes the Party's vision of the future:

There will be no curiosity, no enjoyment of the process of life. All competing pleasures will be destroyed. But always—do not forget this, Winston—always there will be the intoxication of power, constantly increasing and constantly growing subtler. Always, at every moment, there will be the thrill of victory, the sensation of trampling on an enemy who is helpless. If you want a picture of the future, imagine a boot stamping on a human face—forever.

— Part III, chapter III, Nineteen Eighty-Four

=== Censorship ===
One of the most notable themes in Nineteen Eighty-Four is censorship, especially in the Ministry of Truth, where photographs and public archives are manipulated to rid them of "unpersons" (people who have been erased from history by the Party). On the telescreens, almost all figures of production are grossly exaggerated or simply fabricated to indicate an ever-growing economy, even during times when the reality is the opposite. One small example of the endless censorship is Winston being charged with the task of eliminating a reference to an unperson in a newspaper article. He also proceeds to write an article about Comrade Ogilvy, a made-up party member who allegedly "displayed great heroism by leaping into the sea from a helicopter so that the dispatches he was carrying would not fall into enemy hands."

=== Surveillance ===
In Oceania the upper and middle classes have very little true privacy. All of their houses and flats are equipped with two-way telescreens so that they may be watched or listened to at any time. Similar telescreens are found at workstations and in public places, along with hidden microphones. Written correspondence is routinely opened and read by the government before it is delivered. The Thought Police employ undercover agents, who pose as normal citizens and report any person with subversive tendencies. Children are encouraged to report suspicious persons to the government, and some denounce their parents. Citizens are controlled, and the smallest sign of rebellion, even something as small as a suspicious facial expression, can result in immediate arrest and imprisonment. Thus, citizens are compelled to obedience.

=== Poverty and inequality ===
Almost the entire world lives in poverty; hunger, thirst, disease and filth are the norms. Ruined cities and towns are common: the consequence of perpetual wars and extreme economic inefficiency. Social decay and wrecked buildings surround Winston; aside from the ministries' headquarters, little of London was rebuilt. Middle-class citizens and proles consume synthetic foodstuffs and poor-quality "luxuries" such as oily gin and loosely-packed cigarettes, distributed under the "Victory" brand, a parody of the low-quality Indian-made "Victory" cigarettes, which British soldiers commonly smoked during the Second World War.

Winston describes something as simple as the repair of a broken window as requiring committee approval that can take several years and so most of those living in one of the blocks usually do the repairs themselves (Winston himself is called in by Mrs. Parsons to repair her blocked sink). All upper-class and middle-class residences include telescreens that serve both as outlets for propaganda and surveillance devices that allow the Thought Police to monitor them; they can be turned down, but the ones in middle-class residences cannot be turned off.

In contrast to their subordinates, the upper class of Oceanian society reside in clean and comfortable flats in their own quarters, with pantries well-stocked with foodstuffs such as wine, real coffee, real tea, real milk and real sugar, all denied to the general populace. Winston is astonished that the lifts in O'Brien's building work, the telescreens can be completely turned off, and O'Brien has an Asian manservant, Martin. All upper-class citizens are attended to by slaves captured in the "disputed zone", and "The Book" suggests that many have their own cars or even helicopters.

However, despite their insulation and overt privileges, the upper class are still not exempt from the government's brutal restriction of thought and behaviour, even while lies and propaganda apparently originate from their own ranks. Instead, the Oceanian government offers the upper class their "luxuries" in exchange for maintaining their loyalty to the state; non-conformant upper-class citizens can still be condemned, tortured, and executed just like any other individual. "The Book" makes clear that the upper class' living conditions are only "relatively" comfortable, and would be regarded as "austere" by those of the pre-revolutionary élite.

The proles live in poverty and are kept sedated with synthetic entertainment such as pornography, a national lottery whose "big prizes" are always won by non-existent people, and gin, "which the proles were not supposed to drink". At the same time, the proles are freer and less intimidated than the upper classes: they are not expected to be particularly patriotic and the levels of surveillance that they are subjected to are very low; they lack telescreens in their own homes. "The Book" indicates that because the middle class, not the lower class, traditionally starts revolutions, the model demands tight control of the middle class, with ambitious Outer-Party members neutralised via promotion to the Inner Party or "reintegration" (brainwashing via psychological and physical torture) by the Ministry of Love, and proles can be allowed intellectual freedom because they are deemed to lack intellect. Winston nonetheless believes that "the future belonged to the proles".

The standard of living of the populace is extremely low overall. Consumer goods are scarce, and those available through official channels are of low quality; for instance, despite the Party regularly reporting increased boot production, more than half of the Oceanian populace goes barefoot. The Party claims that poverty is a necessary sacrifice for the war effort, and "The Book" confirms that to be partially correct since the purpose of perpetual war is to consume surplus industrial production. As "The Book" explains, society is in fact designed to remain on the brink of starvation, as "In the long run, a hierarchical society was only possible on a basis of poverty and ignorance."

=== Thought monitoring ===
The Party monitors facial expressions and aims to find out and control the thoughts of citizens through the "Thought Police" and the detection and elimination of "thoughtcrime". The Party rejects the legal principle Cogitationis poenam nemo patitur ("Thought does not commit a crime").

It was terribly dangerous to let your thoughts wander when you were in any public place or within range of a telescreen. The smallest thing could give you away. A nervous tic, an unconscious look of anxiety, a habit of muttering to yourself—anything that carried with it the suggestion of abnormality, of having something to hide. In any case, to wear an improper expression on your face (to look incredulous when a victory was announced, for example) was itself a punishable offence. There was even a word for it in Newspeak: FACECRIME, it was called.

One is how to discover, against his will, what another human being is thinking, (...) The scientist of today is either a mixture of psychologist and inquisitor, studying with real ordinary minuteness the meaning of facial expressions, gestures, and tones of voice, and testing the truth-producing effects of drugs, shock therapy, hypnosis, and physical torture; (...)

We are not interested in those stupid crimes that you have committed. The Party is not interested in the overt act: the thought is all we care about.

== Critical reception ==
When it was first published, Nineteen Eighty-Four received critical acclaim. V. S. Pritchett, reviewing it for the New Statesman, wrote: "I do not think I have ever read a novel more frightening and depressing; and yet, such are the originality, the suspense, the speed of writing and withering indignation that it is impossible to put the book down." P. H. Newby, reviewing Nineteen Eighty-Four for The Listener magazine, described it as "the most arresting political novel written by an Englishman since Rex Warner's The Aerodrome." Nineteen Eighty-Four was also praised by Bertrand Russell, E. M. Forster and Harold Nicolson.

Conversely, Edward Shanks was dismissive of Nineteen Eighty-Four. Reviewing the book for The Sunday Times, Shanks wrote that Nineteen Eighty-Four "breaks all records for gloomy vaticination". C. S. Lewis was also critical of the novel, contending that the relationship of Julia and Winston, and especially the Party's view on sex, lacked credibility, and that the setting was "odious rather than tragic". The historian Isaac Deutscher was far more critical of Orwell from a Marxist perspective, and characterised him as a "simple minded anarchist". Deutscher argued that Orwell had failed to grasp Marxist dialectics and that Nineteen Eighty-Four had been appropriated for anti-communist Cold War propaganda. Despite this, Deutscher still acknowledged that few novels in history have achieved such massive popularity or made a comparable impact on politics.

Upon its publication many American reviewers interpreted it as a statement on the socialist policies of the British prime minister, Clement Attlee, or the policies of Joseph Stalin. Serving as prime minister from 1945 to 1951, Attlee implemented wide-ranging social reforms and changes in the British economy following the Second World War. The American trade union leader Francis A. Hanson wanted to recommend the book to his members, but was concerned with some of the reviews it had received, so Orwell wrote a letter to him. In it he described his novel as a satire, and said:

I do not believe that the kind of society I describe will necessarily arrive, but I believe (allowing, of course, for the fact that the book is a satire) that something resembling it could arrive...[it is] a show...[of the] perversions to which a centralised economy is liable and which have already been partly realisable in communism and fascism.

— George Orwell, Letter to Francis A. Hanson

Throughout its publication history Nineteen Eighty-Four has been banned and legally challenged as subversive or ideologically corrupting, like the dystopian novels We (1924) by Yevgeny Zamyatin, Brave New World (1932) by Aldous Huxley, Darkness at Noon (1940) by Arthur Koestler, Kallocain (1940) by Karin Boye and Fahrenheit 451 (1953) by Ray Bradbury.

According to Czesław Miłosz, a defector from Stalinist Poland, the book also made an impression behind the Iron Curtain. Writing in The Captive Mind, he stated "[a] few have become acquainted with Orwell's 1984; because it is both difficult to obtain and dangerous to possess, it is known only to certain members of the Inner Party. Orwell fascinates them through his insight into details they know well ... Even those who know Orwell only by hearsay are amazed that a writer who never lived in Russia should have so keen a perception into its life." The writer Christopher Hitchens has called this "one of the greatest compliments that one writer has ever bestowed upon another ... Only one or two years after Orwell's death, in other words, his book about a secret book circulated only within the Inner Party was itself a secret book circulated only within the Inner Party."

== Adaptations ==
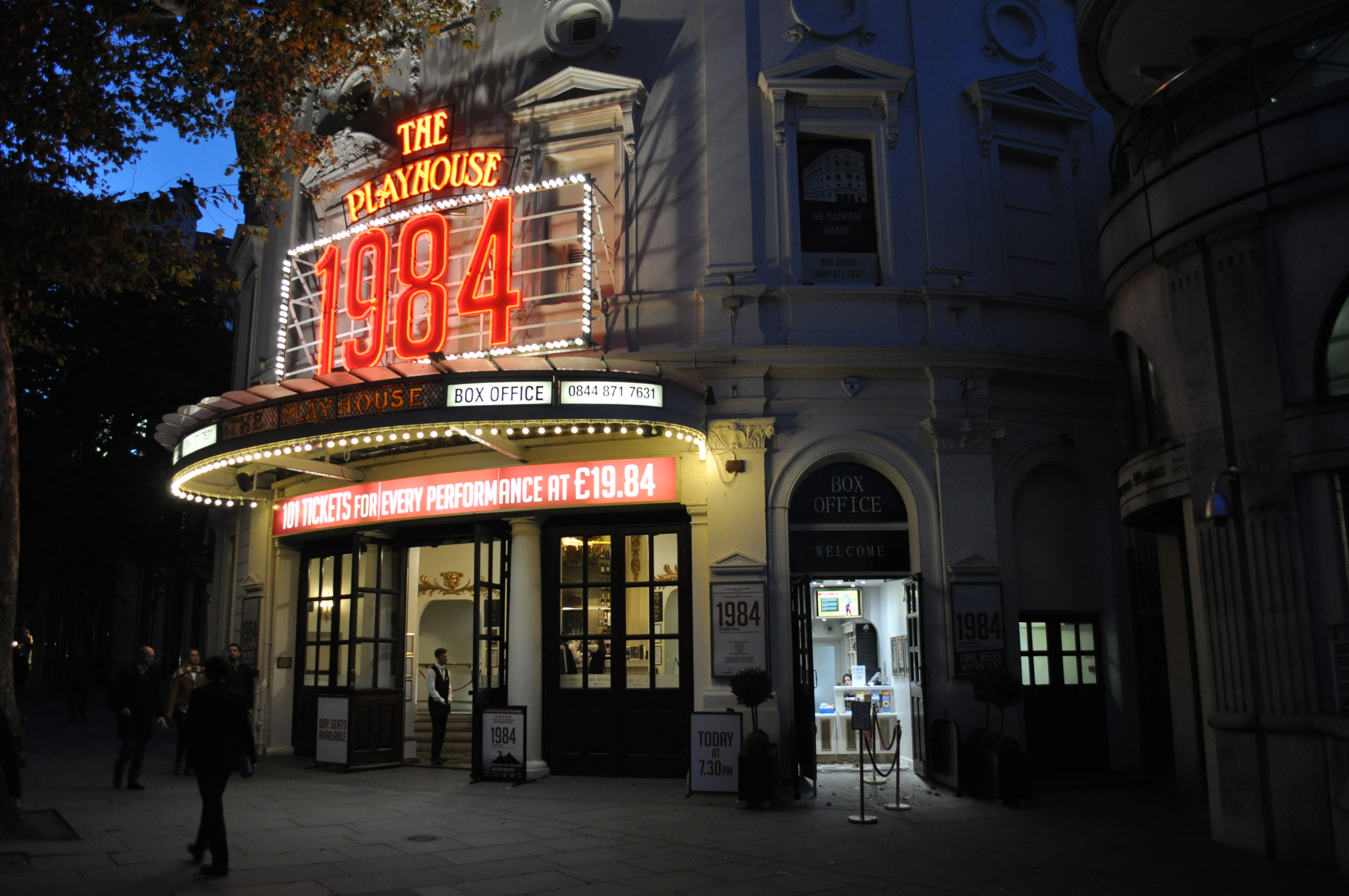
Stage play 1984 at the Playhouse Theatre in the West End in 2016

In the same year as the novel's publishing, a one-hour radio adaptation featuring David Niven was aired on the NBC radio network as part of the NBC University Theatre series. The first television adaptation appeared as part of CBS's Studio One series in September 1953. BBC Television broadcast an adaptation by Nigel Kneale in December 1954 that was watched by seven million viewers in the UK. Described as British television's first "watercooler moment" by The Telegraph, the BBC adaptation made a dramatic impact on a fledgling television audience who were horrified by the graphic depiction of a totalitarian regime controlling the population, including scenes of Winston Smith (Peter Cushing) being tormented in Room 101 by rats as punishment for daring to rebel against totalitarian rule.

The first feature film adaptation, 1984, was released in 1956. A second feature-length adaptation, Nineteen Eighty-Four, followed in 1984, a reasonably faithful adaptation, which starred John Hurt as Winston Smith and also featured Richard Burton in his final role. The story has been adapted several other times to radio, television and film; other media adaptations include theatre (a musical and a play), an opera and ballet. The BBC's 2013 Orwell season saw Christopher Eccleston star as Winston in a BBC Radio 4 adaptation. An audio dramatisation was released in 2024 to critical acclaim, starring Andrew Garfield as Winston, Tom Hardy as Big Brother, Cynthia Erivo as Julia, and Andrew Scott as O'Brien, featuring a score by Matt Bellamy and Ilan Eshkeri performed by a 60-piece orchestra at Abbey Road Studios. The 1983 novel 1985 is an unofficial sequel. The 2023 novel Julia, written by Sandra Newman, retold the novel from Julia's perspective. It was published with the permission of the Orwell estate.

== Translations ==
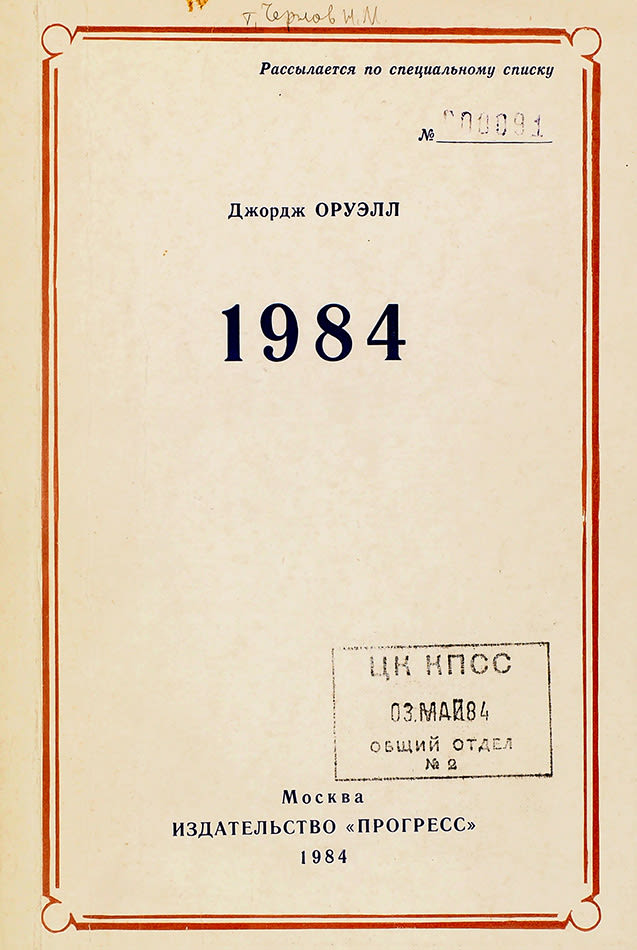
Nineteen Eighty-Four Russian version published in the Soviet Union in 1984. A limited edition, only for members of the Central Committee of the Communist Party of the Soviet Union.

The novel was banned in the Soviet Union until 1988, when the first publicly available Russian version in the country, translated by Vyacheslav Nedoshivin, was published in Kodry, a literary journal of Soviet Moldavia. In 1989, another Russian version, translated by Viktor Golyshev, was also published. Outside the Soviet Union, the first Russian version was serialised in the emigre magazine Grani in the mid-1950s, then published as a book in 1957 in Frankfurt. Another Russian version, translated by Sergei Tolstoy from a French version, was published in Rome in 1966. These translations were smuggled into the Soviet Union and became quite popular among dissidents. Some underground published translations also appeared in the Soviet Union. The Soviet philosopher Evald Ilyenkov translated it from German into Russian.

For the Soviet elite, as early as 1959, according to the order of the Ideological Department of the Central Committee of the Soviet Communist Party, the Foreign Literature Publishers secretly issued a Russian version of the novel, for the senior officers of the Communist Party.

In the People's Republic of China the first Simplified Chinese version, translated by Dong Leshan, was serialised in the periodical Selected Translations from Foreign Literature in 1979, for senior officials and intellectuals deemed politically reliable enough. In 1985, the Chinese version was published by Huacheng Publishing House, as a restricted publication. It was first available to the general public in 1988, by the same publisher. Amy Hawkins and Jeffrey Wasserstrom of The Atlantic stated in 2019 that the book is widely available in mainland China for several reasons: the general public largely no longer read books; because the elites who do read books feel connected to the ruling party anyway; and because the Communist Party sees being too aggressive in blocking cultural products as a liability. The authors stated, "It was—and remains—as easy to buy 1984 and Animal Farm in Shenzhen or Shanghai as it is in London or Los Angeles." They also stated that "The assumption is not that Chinese people can't figure out the meaning of 1984, but that the small number of people who will bother to read it won't pose much of a threat." The journalist Michael Rank argued that it is only because the novel is set in London and written by a foreigner that the Chinese authorities believe it has nothing to do with China.

By 1989, Nineteen Eighty-Four had been translated into 65 languages, more than any other novel in English at that time. The amateur translator Tsiu Ing-sing's Taiwanese Hokkien translation, which uses romanisation alongside Chinese characters, was published in 2025.

== Cultural impact ==
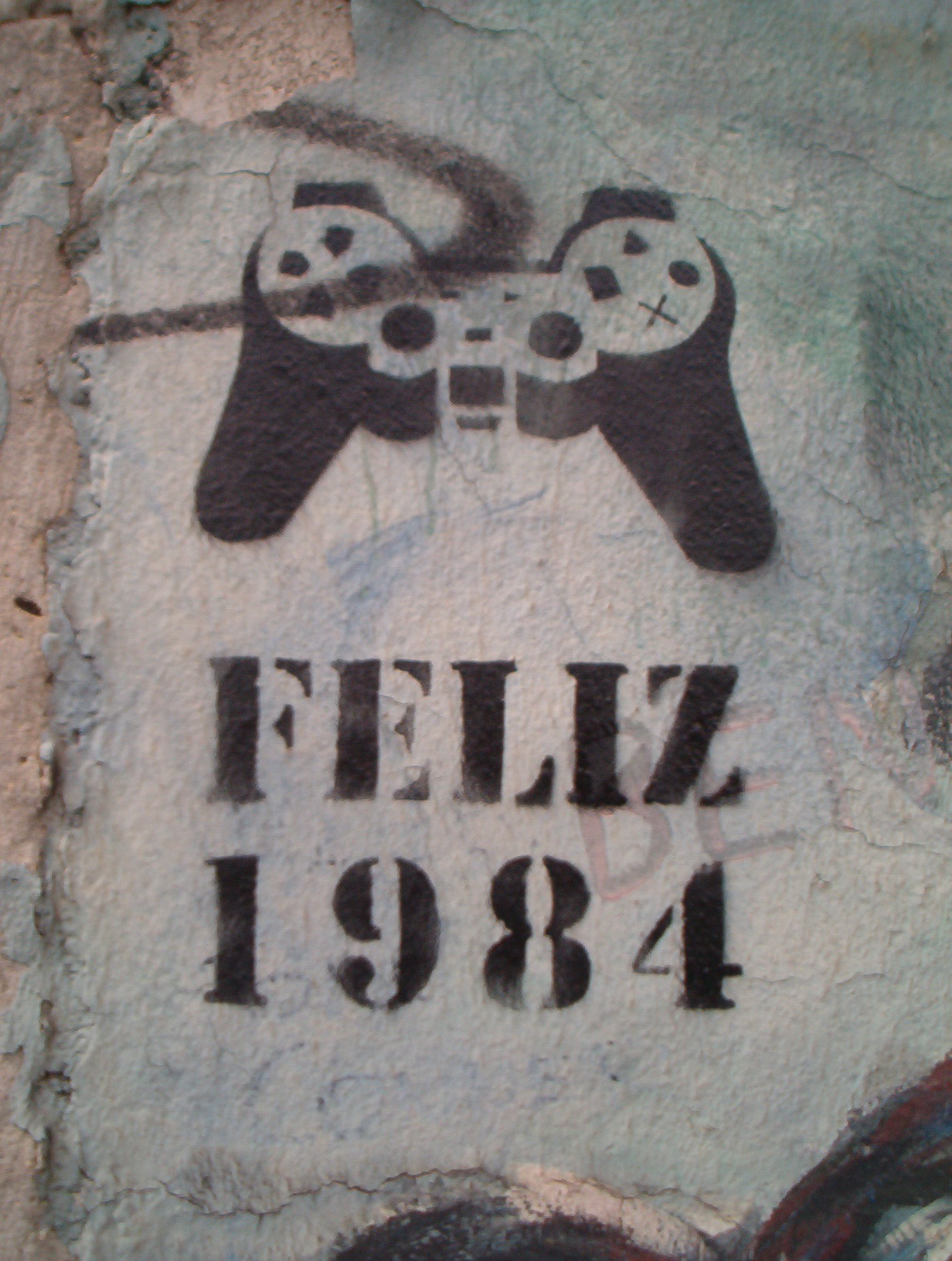
"Happy 1984" (in Spanish or Portuguese) stencil graffiti on a standing piece of the Berlin Wall, 2005

The effect of Nineteen Eighty-Four on the English language is extensive; the concepts of Big Brother, Room 101, the Thought Police, thoughtcrime, unperson, memory hole (oblivion), doublethink (simultaneously holding and believing contradictory beliefs) and Newspeak (ideological language) have become common phrases for denoting totalitarian authority. Doublespeak and groupthink are both deliberate elaborations of doublethink, and the adjective "Orwellian" means similar to Orwell's writings, especially Nineteen Eighty-Four. The practice of ending words with "-speak" (such as mediaspeak) is drawn from the novel. Orwell is perpetually associated with 1984; in July 1984 an asteroid was discovered by Antonín Mrkos and named after Orwell.

References to the themes, concepts and plot of Nineteen Eighty-Four have appeared frequently in other works, especially in popular music and video entertainment. An example is the worldwide hit reality television show Big Brother, in which a group of people live together in a large house, isolated from the outside world but continuously watched by television cameras.

Noam Chomsky adapted Orwell's neologism "unpeople" to describe those whom the state deems "unfit to enter history" and whom the state strips of the right to live in order to advance the state's sovereignty.

In November 2011, the United States federal government argued before the US Supreme Court that it could continue to use GPS tracking of individuals without first seeking a warrant. In response, Justice Stephen Breyer questioned what that means for a democratic society by referencing Nineteen Eighty-Four, stating "If you win this case, then there is nothing to prevent the police or the government from monitoring 24 hours a day the public movement of every citizen of the United States. So if you win, you suddenly produce what sounds like 1984 ..."

The book touches on the invasion of privacy and ubiquitous surveillance. From mid-2013 it was publicised that the American National Security Agency has been secretly monitoring and storing global internet traffic, including the bulk data collection of email and phone call data. Sales of Nineteen Eighty-Four increased by up to seven times within the first week of the 2013 mass surveillance leaks. The book again topped the Amazon.com sales charts in 2017 after a controversy involving Kellyanne Conway using the phrase "alternative facts" to explain discrepancies with the media.

On 5 November 2019, the BBC named Nineteen Eighty-Four on its list of the 100 most influential novels. In 2020, it was number three on the list of "Top Check Outs of All Time" by the New York Public Library.

Nineteen Eighty-Four entered the public domain on 1 January 2021, 70 years after Orwell's death, in most of the world. It is still under copyright in the US until 95 years after publication, or 2044.

== Brave New World comparisons ==
In October 1949, after reading Nineteen Eighty-Four, Huxley sent a letter to Orwell in which he argued that it would be more efficient for rulers to stay in power by the softer touch by allowing citizens to seek pleasure in order to control them rather than by use of brute force. He wrote:

Whether in actual fact the policy of the boot-on-the-face can go on indefinitely seems doubtful. My own belief is that the ruling oligarchy will find less arduous and wasteful ways of governing and of satisfying its lust for power, and these ways will resemble those which I described in Brave New World.

...

Within the next generation I believe that the world's rulers will discover that infant conditioning and narco-hypnosis are more efficient, as instruments of government, than clubs and prisons, and that the lust for power can be just as completely satisfied by suggesting people into loving their servitude as by flogging and kicking them into obedience.

In the decades since the publication of Nineteen Eighty-Four, there have been numerous comparisons to Huxley's Brave New World, which had been published 17 years earlier, in 1932. They are both predictions of societies dominated by a central government and are both based on extensions of the trends of their times. However, members of the ruling class of Nineteen Eighty-Four use brutal force, torture and harsh mind control to keep individuals submissive to authority, while rulers in Brave New World keep the citizens subservient via drugs, hypnosis, genetic conditioning and pleasurable distractions. Regarding censorship, in Nineteen Eighty-Four the government tightly controls information to keep the population in line, but in Huxley's world, so much information is published that readers are easily distracted and overlook the information that is relevant.

Elements of both novels can be seen in modern-day societies, with Huxley's vision being more dominant in the West and Orwell's vision more prevalent with dictatorships, as is pointed out in essays that compare the two novels, including Huxley's own Brave New World Revisited.

Comparisons with later dystopian novels like The Handmaid's Tale, Virtual Light, The Private Eye and The Children of Men have also been drawn.

== In popular culture ==
- In 1955, an episode of BBC's The Goon Show, 1985, was broadcast, written by Spike Milligan and Eric Sykes and based on Nigel Kneale's television adaptation. It was re-recorded about a month later with the same script but a slightly different cast. 1985 parodies many of the main scenes in Orwell's novel.
- In 1970, the American rock group Spirit released the song "1984" based on Orwell's novel.
- In 1973, the ex–Soft Machine bassist Hugh Hopper released an album called 1984 on the Columbia label (UK), consisting of instrumentals with Orwellian titles such as "Miniluv", "Minipax", "Minitrue" and so forth.
- In 1974, David Bowie released the album Diamond Dogs, which is thought to be loosely based on Nineteen Eighty-Four. It includes the tracks "We Are the Dead", "1984" and "Big Brother". Before the album was made, Bowie's management (MainMan) had planned for Bowie and Anthony Ingrassia (MainMan's creative consultant) to co-write and direct a musical production of Orwell's Nineteen Eighty-Four, but Orwell's widow refused to give MainMan the rights.
- In 1977, the British rock band the Jam released the album This Is the Modern World, which includes the track "Standards" by Paul Weller. This track concludes with the lyrics "...and ignorance is strength, we have God on our side, look, you know what happened to Winston."
- In 1984, Ridley Scott directed a television commercial, "1984", to launch Apple's Macintosh computer. The advertisement stated, "1984 won't be like 1984", suggesting that the Apple Mac would be freedom from Big Brother, i.e., the IBM PC.
- Rage Against the Machine's 2000 single, "Testify", from their album The Battle of Los Angeles, features the use of "The Party" slogan, "Who controls the past(now), controls the future. Who controls the present(now), controls the past."
- An episode of Doctor Who, "The God Complex", depicts an alien ship disguised as a hotel containing Room 101-like spaces, and also, like the novel, quotes the nursery rhyme "Oranges and Lemons".
- Radiohead's 2003 single "2 + 2 = 5", from their album Hail to the Thief, is Orwellian by title and content. Thom Yorke states, "I was listening to a lot of political programs on BBC Radio 4. I found myself writing down little nonsense phrases, those Orwellian euphemisms that [the British and American governments] are so fond of. They became the background of the record."
- In September 2009, the English rock band Muse released The Resistance, which included songs influenced by Nineteen Eighty-Four.
- In Marilyn Manson's autobiography The Long Hard Road Out of Hell, he states: "I was thoroughly terrified by the idea of the end of the world and the Antichrist. So I became obsessed with it... reading prophetic books like... 1984 by George Orwell..."
- The English band Bastille reference the novel in their song "Back to the Future", the fifth track on their 2022 album Give Me the Future, in the opening lyrics: "Feels like we danced into a nightmare/We're living 1984/If doublethink's no longer fiction/We'll dream of Huxley's Island shores."
- Released in 2004, KAKU P-Model/Susumu Hirasawa's song "Big Brother" directly references 1984, and the album itself is about a fictional dystopia in a distant future.
- The Used released a song by the same name, "1984", on their 2020 album Heartwork.

== See also ==
- Fahrenheit 451, a similar novel revolving around censorship
- Ideocracy
- Kallocain, a novel that takes place in a similar setting
- List of stories set in a future now in the past
- Mass surveillance
- Scapegoating
- V for Vendetta, a similar graphic novel and film
- We, a similar novel
