= Panelli =

Panelli is a surname. Notable people with the surname include:

- Angelo Panelli (1887–1967), Italian stamp forger
- Edward A. Panelli (1931–2024), American jurist
- John Panelli (1926–2012), American football player
- Paolo Panelli (1925–1997), Italian comedian and film actor
- Paolo Panelli (painter) (1656–1759), Italian painter

== See also ==
- Panella (surname)
