= Dorian Lynskey =

British culture journalist, writer and podcaster

Dorian Lynskey is a British writer and cultural journalist. He has written books including The Ministry of Truth, a history of Nineteen Eighty-Four, 33 Revolutions per Minute, a study of protest songs, and Everything Must Go, on narratives imagining the end of the world.
