= Carolyn Kellogg =

American author and book critic

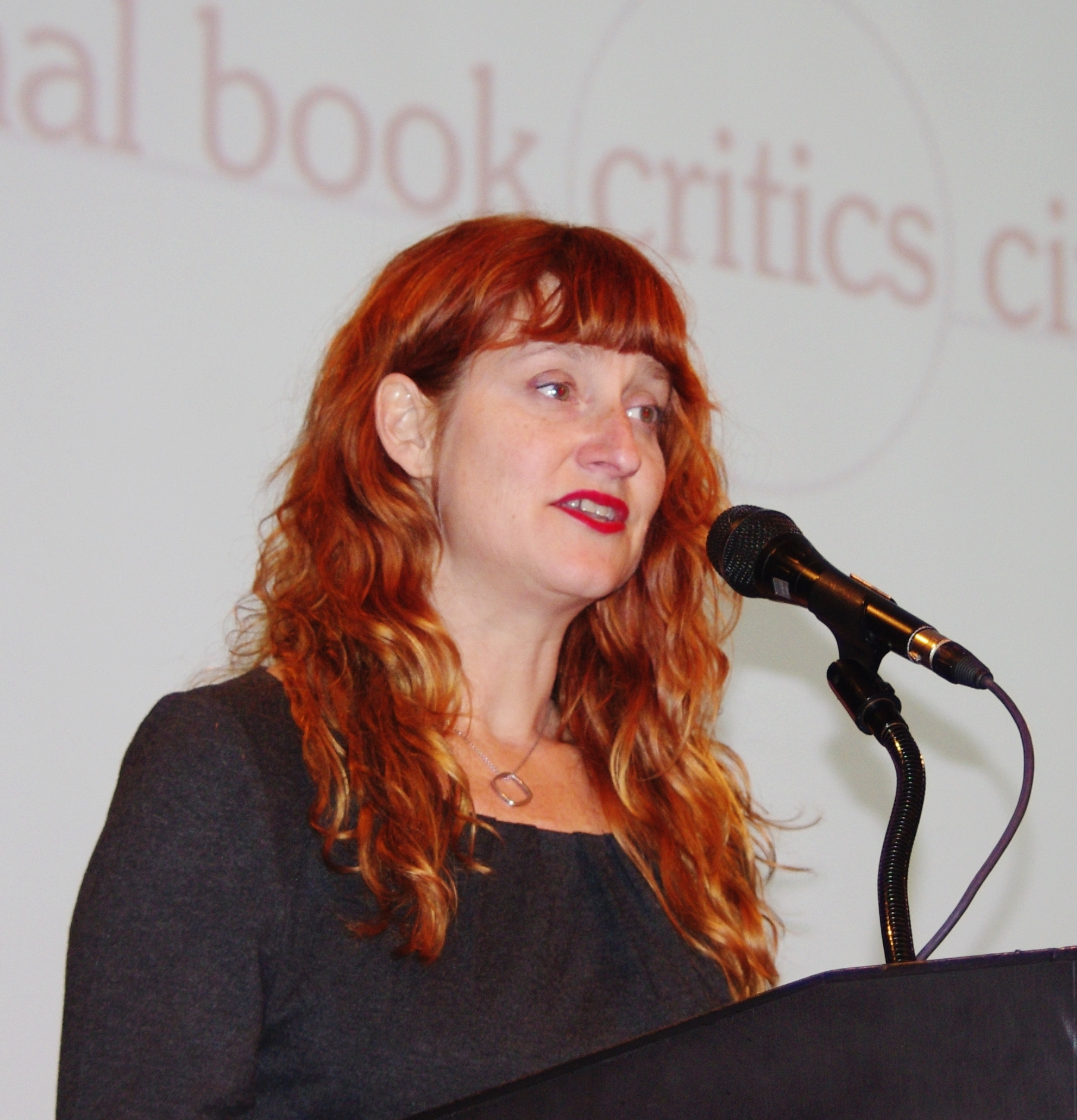
- Kellogg in 2011
- Born: United States
- Education: University of Southern California (BA); University of Pittsburgh (MFA)
- Occupations: Writer, journalist, book critic, author
- Writing career
- Genres: Journalism, literary criticism

Carolyn Kellogg is an American author and book critic. She worked at the Los Angeles Times as a staff writer covering books from 2010 to 2016. She was named Books Editor of the Los Angeles Times in 2016 and left at the end of 2018.

== Early life and education ==
Kellogg grew up in Rhode Island, the daughter of a librarian. She has a bachelor's degree from the University of Southern California and earned her MFA in fiction at the University of Pittsburgh, working with Chuck Kinder.

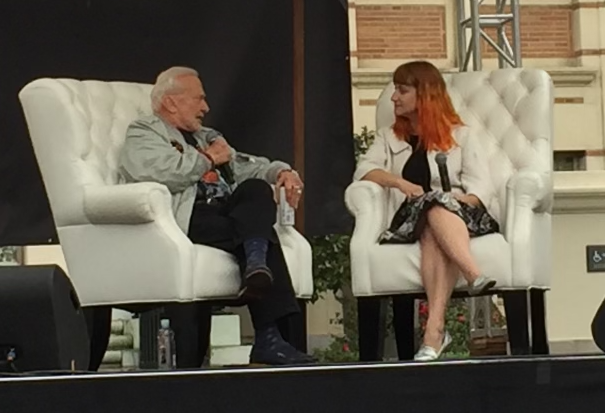
Kellogg interviewing Buzz Aldrin in 2016

== Career ==
Kellogg first worked at Disney Interactive in the 1990s in new media. Her management and editorial work has included the music-festival website Woodstock.com, LAist.com, and the public-radio show Marketplace. She wrote about her work as an early book blogger for The Paris Review.

Kellogg started covering book news for the LA Times in 2008 when she created their books blog, Jacket Copy, covering book and publishing industry news.

In 2010, she received a Times Editorial Award for her feature blogging. During her tenure at the LA Times, Kellogg did many notable interviews, including with Jimmy Carter, Juan Felipe Herrera, and Chimamanda Ngozi Adichie.

Kellogg was promoted to books editor in 2016. In 2019, she was a judge of the National Book Award in Nonfiction. She served on the board of the National Book Critics Circle as the vice president for six years.
