= Etsu Inagaki Sugimoto =

American novelist

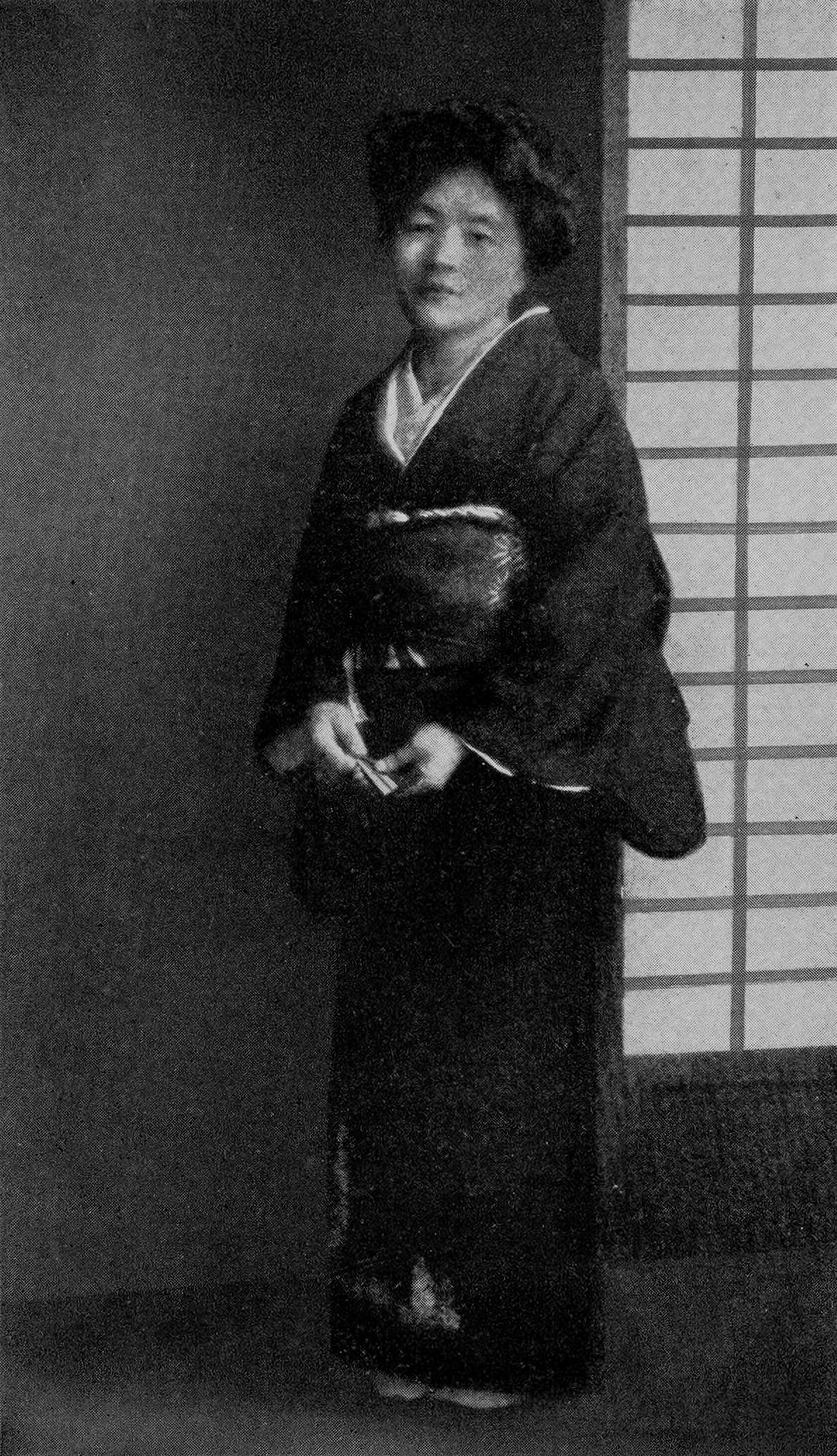
A photograph of Sugimoto from A Daughter of the Samurai, published 1925

Etsuko Sugimoto (杉本 鉞子, Sugimoto Etsuko; 1874 – June 20, 1950), also known as Etsu Inagaki Sugimoto, was a Japanese American autobiographer and novelist.

== Biography ==
She was born in Nagaoka in Echigo Province in Japan, now part of Niigata Prefecture. Her father had once been a high-ranking samurai official in Nagaoka, but with the breakdown of the feudal system shortly before her birth, the economic situation of her family took a turn for the worse.

Although originally destined to be a priestess, she became engaged, through an arranged marriage, to a Japanese merchant living in Cincinnati, Ohio. Etsu attended a Methodist school in Tokyo in preparation for her life in the U.S., and became a Christian.

In 1898, she journeyed to the US, where she married her fiancé and became mother of two daughters. After her husband's death, she returned to Japan, but later returned to the U.S. for her daughters to complete their education.

Later, she lived in New York City, where she turned to literature and taught Japanese language, culture and history at Columbia University. She also wrote for newspapers and magazines. She died in 1950.

== Works ==
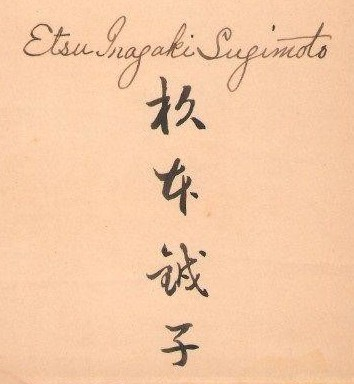
Sugimoto's signature

- A Daughter of the Samurai (1925)
- With Taro and Hana in Japan (in cooperation with Nancy Virginia Austen 1926-09-23)
- A Daughter of the Narikin (1932)
- In memoriam: Florence Mills Wilson (1933)
- A Daughter of the Nohfu (1935)
- Grandmother O Kyo (1940)
- But the Ships Are Sailing (1959, by Etsu's daughter Chiyono Sugimoto Kiyooka; the work contains biographical details of the last years of Etsu Sugimoto's life)
