= The Ministry of Truth (Lynskey book) =

2019 non-fiction book by Dorian Lynskey

- First edition (UK)
- Author: Dorian Lynskey
- Subject: History of literature
- Publication date: May 2019 Picador (UK); June 2019 Doubleday (US)
- Pages: 368
- ISBN: 9780385544054

External videos
- The author discusses the book on Dan Snow's History Hit podcast

The Ministry of Truth: The Biography of George Orwell's 1984 is a book-length history of George Orwell's 1949 dystopian novel Nineteen Eighty-Four written by Dorian Lynskey and published by Doubleday in 2019.
