= A Daughter of the Samurai =

1925 book by Etsu Inagaki Sugimoto

- Author: Etsu Inagaki Sugimoto
- Language: English
- Genre: Autobiographical novel
- Publisher: Doubleday
- Publication date: 1925
- ISBN: 978-1-64679-604-5
- Dewey Decimal: 952.03092
- Text: A Daughter of the Samurai at Wikisource

A Daughter of the Samurai is a 1925 (Note: Some sources date the book's publication in 1926, however it was originally published the year prior.) autobiographical novel by Etsu Inagaki Sugimoto.

== Conception ==
Etsu Inagaki Sugimoto (1874-1950) was a Japanese-American writer and educator. She was encouraged by Christopher Morley to write about her life in Japan. She was 51 years old and had been living in the US for over 20 years when she wrote, A Daughter of a Samurai. Her intention in writing the book, revealed by the protagonist, Etsu-bō, was to clarify the secret that was hidden from people in the East and the West:

Years passed, and Etsu-bō, the little girl who had listened to the story of the black ships and the red barbarians, herself went sailing on a black ship that moved without sails, to a new home in the distant land of the red barbarians. There she learned that hearts are the same on both sides of the world; but this is a secret that is hidden from the people of the East, and hidden from the people of the West.

— Etsu-bō, in Etsu Inagaki Sugimoto, A Daughter of the Samurai (1925), pg. 314

It initially was serialized in the Asia magazine before later being released as a book in 1925. A niece of Etsu's so-called "American mother", Florence Mills Wilson, had rewritten the manuscript prior to it being sent to publishers.

== Contents ==
The full text of A Daughter of the Samurai at Wikisource

The book consists of 32 chapters. It follows the immigration of Etsu-bō, author surrogate for Sugimoto, to the United States of America and compares the life of being a woman in Japan to in America.

== Reception ==
A year prior to its publication, the Immigration Act of 1924 prevented the immigration of people from Asian countries into the US, fueled by "Yellow Peril" myth. Despite this, or because of it, the book was successful, with Setsuko Hirakawa stating the book's success was due to increasing western curiosity of Japan. It had sold 10 million copies by 1962.

Critic reviews, both contemporary and retrospective, have praised the book. Dorothy E. Guttmacher, writing for the Baltimore Sun, compared her with Joseph Conrad, stating her style displayed both "vividness and charm." Daniel E. Ahearne for the Hartford Courant described the book as "pure pose-poetry". Richard G. Hubler for the Los Angeles Times described it as "a charming curtsy in print."

== Analysis ==
The book is commonly described as an autobiography or a memoir, however it is more accurate to describe it as an autobiographical novel as it is a work of fiction based on the actual events of Sugimoto's life.

It has been described as a "transnational feminist" novel which examines the lives of both Japanese and white women in the early 20th century. While admitting that American women are more "socially free" than Japanese women, Etsu-bō states they are the targets of male humor and disrespect in-contrast to the "subtle power" of Japanese women, whose role it is, as Etsu-bō explains, to manage the income and all expenses for the household, while granting their husbands pocket-money. Thus, they are financially educated, whereas she found that American women proclaim (sometimes with pride) to have no knowledge of financial matters.

== Translations ==
It has been translated into multiple languages, including a Japanese translation in 1943.

Language	Title	Translator(s)	Publisher	Year
French	Une fille du samouraï	René de Cérenville	Editions Victor Attinger	1930
Swedish				1934
German	Eine Tochter der Samurai		S. Fischer Verlag	1935
Finnish	Samurain tytär		Häftad, Finska	1937
Danish				1937
Polish				1937
Japanese	武士の娘	Miyo Ōiwa	Nagasaki Shoten	1943
Russian	Дочь самурая (Doch' samuraya)	Daria Loginova	Symposium	2024
Russian	Дочь самурая (Doch' samuraya)	Yulia Poleshchuk	Yandex Books	2024
