= Dulce Carman =

New Zealand romance writer

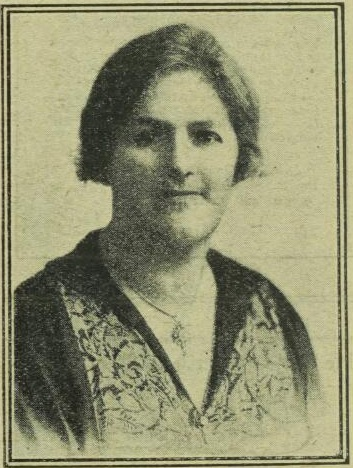
Dulce Carman

Edith Marie Dulce Carman (1883 — 1970) was a New Zealand romance writer who published over twenty novels. She was a cousin of the Canadian poet Bliss Carman.

Carman was born in Norwich, England, and emigrated with her family to Feilding in New Zealand in 1892. In 1906 she was one of twenty-one writers commended in the Lyceum Club's colonial literary competition. In December 1911 she married David Drummond, after which she moved to Dannevirke. She published short stories in New Zealand newspapers and magazines, before her first novel, The Broad Stairway, was published in 1925. She published her works under her maiden name. Carman went on to publish over 500 short stories and serialised novels in New Zealand newspapers and magazines.

She moved to Hastings for health reasons in 1932 after a severe illness which threatened her eyesight.

In 1948 her second novel, 'Neath the Maori Moon was published, and she continued to write despite ongoing health issues, publishing a further 26 novels between 1949 and 1967. In 1962 she was elected an honorary founder of the Romantic Novelists' Association.

Carman specialised in stories about 'Maoriland', a romantic, idealised version of New Zealand and Māori–European race relations. Carman's novels were set in rural areas in the North Island. She described them as 'family stories', suitable for all ages, rather than romances. Carman stated that she consulted Māori to make sure that her writing about Māori myths and practices was accurate. For example, Carman said about her novel A million dreams away, published in 1956:

It is a doubly checked version of the way in which the two races of New Zealand live in harmony and both races have claimed that it is correct and unbiased. The book was written because every one of my books has been quoted as a 'lesson in tolerance which other nations might copy'. I was urged to write a story stressing this aspect of our life here.

Although Carman's works were very popular during her lifetime, they have since been criticised as Anglocentric and patronising.

Carman died on 1 October 1970.
