= Louis J. Panella =

American musician, composer and teacher (1881-1940)

Louis J. Panella (1881 – March 13, 1940) was an American musician, composer, and teacher. He wrote many popular songs, both music and lyrics, and many pieces for concert bands. He was the brother of Frank Panella. Louis Panella played trumpet with the Pittsburgh Symphony Orchestra and taught trumpet at the Carnegie Institute of Technology (now Carnegie-Mellon University). His best known composition is a concert band march, American Red Cross.

== Partial list of songs ==
- My Sunshine Rosie Rose (1911)
- Love Tokens (1911)
- That Spooky Rag (1912) Words: Geo E Roesch
- Echoes of the Chimes (1914)
- Pansy Blossoms (1915)
- At the Dance (1915)
- Wedding Day (1915)
- Carolina Lullaby (1921) `Words by: Walter Hirsch
- The Pitt Panther (1923) Hail to Pitt Words: Howard E. Reppert
- Moonbeams (1924)
- Dance of the Kewpies (1926)
- The Woodpecker (1926)
- An Old Familiar Song (1931) a tribute to Stephen Collins Foster, Lyrics by Devolco C. Potter

== Partial list of works for band ==
- 1902 Allegiance to the Flag
- 1907 Fighting Chance
- 1911 Civic Pride
- 1918 American Red Cross March
- 1919 With the Colors
- 1922 The Pitt Panther
- 1924 In Command March
- 1924 The University of Dayton, Loyalty March
- 1932 Amerita
- 1932 The Junior
- 1933 Alhambra festival, overture
- Freshman
- Knights of Chivalry
- Master Melodies Overture
- Overture of Overtures
- Senior
- Sophomore
- Venus
