= Bronstein =

Bronstein is a Yiddish surname. Notable people include:

- Alex Bronstein (born 1980), Russian-Israeli computer scientist
- Alvin Bronstein
- Alexander Bronstein (born 1954), founder of the Solway Group
- Chad Bronstein (born 1987), American businessman
- David Bronstein (1924–2006), Soviet chess Grandmaster
- Eitan Bronstein, co-founder of Zochrot
- Eleanor Bron, (born 1938) British actress, formerly Bronstein
- Fred Bronstein
- Hila Bronstein (born 1983), German singer, known as a member of Bro'Sis
- Ilya Nikolaevich Bronshtein (1903–1976), Russian applied mathematician
- Jake Bronstein, internet personality
- Judith Bronstein
- Kenneth Bronstein
- Lev Davidovich Bronstein, birth name of Leon Trotsky (1879–1940), Russian revolutionary and politician
- Luis Marcos Bronstein (1946–2014), Argentine chess master
- Martin Bronstein (born 1935), Canadian actor
- Mary Bronstein
- Matvei Bronstein (1906–1938), Soviet theoretical physicist
- Max Bronstein, birth name of Mordecai Ardon
- Michael Bronstein (born 1980), British-Israeli computer scientist and entrepreneur
- Mihhail Bronštein (1923–2022), Estonian economist
- Mikhail Bronshtein (born 1949), Russia Esperantist, writer, engineer, singer-songwriter
- Olga Kameneva (née Bronstein) (1881–1941), sister of Leon Trotsky
- Pablo Bronstein
- Paula Bronstein
- Phil Bronstein (born 1950), editor of the San Francisco Chronicle
- Raphael Bronstein (1895–1988), violin performer and teacher
- Raya Bronstein (1929–2023), Israeli sportswoman and sports educator and organizer
- Ronald Bronstein, American film director, screenwriter, editor and actor
- Samuel Bronstein, birth name of Samuel Bronston
- Srul Bronshtein (1913–1943), Romanian/Soviet Yiddish-language poet
- Zinaida Bronstein, birth name of Zinaida Volkova

== See also ==
- Bernstein
- Borenstein, Bornstein, Bornsztain
- Braunstein, Brownstein
- Bronson, Bronston
