= Brownstone (disambiguation) =

Brownstone is a building material. The term is also used in the United States to refer to a townhouse clad in this material.

Brownstone may also refer to:

- Brownstone (group), an American R&B group
- Brownstone (musical), a 1979 musical
- Brownstone (surname)
- The Brownstone Institute, a non-profit think tank founded by Jeffrey Tucker and opposing COVID-19 restrictions
- Brownstone Productions, a production company founded in 2002 by actor and producer Elizabeth Banks
- "Mr. Brownstone", a Guns N' Roses song
- "Brownstone", slang for impure illicit recreational drug mixtures such as black tar heroin, which can have a brown or dark coloration from impurities, whence the name of the Guns N' Roses song
- Brown Stone, a neighborhood in Beijing, China
- Brownstone (graphic novel), graphic novel by Samuel Teer and Mar Julia

Brownstones may refer to:

- Brownstones Formation, a geological formation found in the Anglo-Welsh Basin
