= Bronstein (disambiguation) =

Bronstein is a Yiddish surname.

Bronstein may also refer to:

- Bronstein and Semendyayev, also known simply as "Bronstein", Handbook of mathematics, a classical book on mathematics
- Bronstein-class frigate, a class of United States Navy warships
- USS Bronstein, two ships of the United States Navy
