= Mikhail Bronshtein (disambiguation) =

Mikhail Bronshtein is the Russian-language name of the following persons:

- Michael Bronstein (born 1980), British-Israeli computer scientist and entrepreneur
- Mihhail Bronštein (1923–2022), Estonian economist
- Mikhail Bronshtein (born 1949), Russia Esperantist, writer, engineer, singer-songwriter
