= Esperanto in the Soviet Union =

International auxiliary language in the USSR

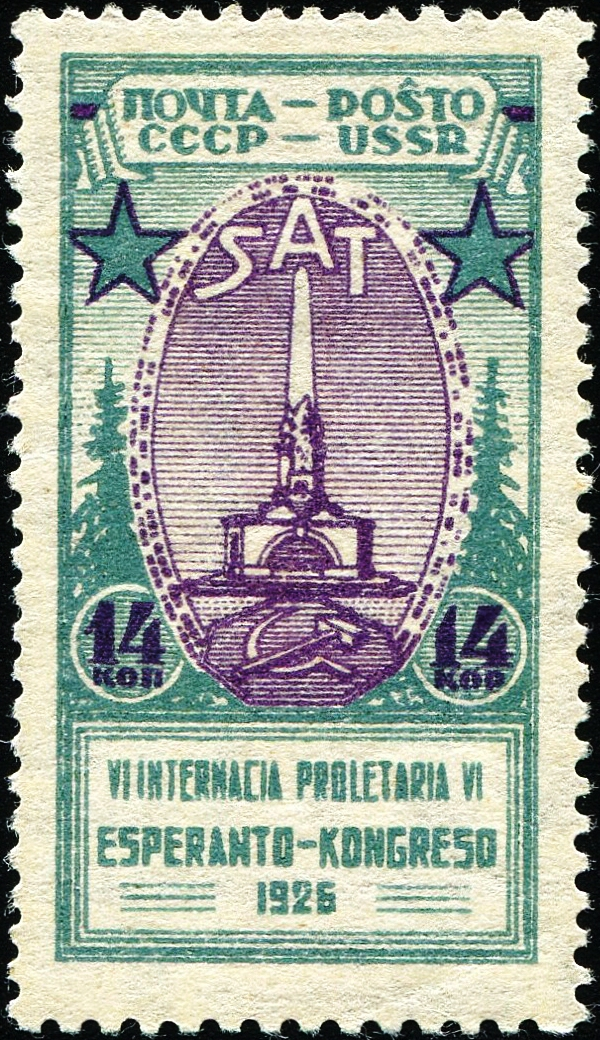
A 1926 Esperanto postage stamp from the Soviet Union.

Esperanto was variously endorsed and oppressed in the Soviet Union throughout its history. The language was permitted by the government in the 1920s, but its internationalist nature brought it under scrutiny in the 1930s and Joseph Stalin enforced measures against the Esperanto community, having Esperanto speakers imprisoned and killed as part of the Great Purge. The Esperanto community was restored in the Soviet Union following the death of Joseph Stalin in 1953, but it did not achieve its earlier prominence.

== Government policy ==
Limited information exists on official government positions regarding Esperanto in the Soviet Union, as little official documentation addressed the subject. According to a German press release in 1920, the Soviet Union required the teaching of Esperanto in public schools, though this report was denied by People's Commissar for Education Anatoly Lunacharsky. Following the New Economic Policy in 1921, the Soviet Union limited its endorsement of cultural initiatives, including Esperanto. In 1925, the Soviet post office published the world's first Esperanto postage stamps.

Vladimir Lenin sought international cooperation between socialist movements, but neither he nor the other Bolsheviks believed that a constructed language should serve this purpose. Lenin was skeptical of Esperanto, and he believed that it was necessary for each country's revolution to occur within its own culture and its own language before international unity between socialist groups could occur. When Joseph Stalin took power and shifted focus toward socialism in one country, he cast doubt on the idea of a single world language. He accused those who wished to prematurely expand of being Russian nationalists deviating from Communist ideology.

When the Great Purge began in 1937, the Soviet government identified "citizens with contacts abroad" as one of the categories of suspicious persons. Esperantists were labeled as "spies, Zionists, and cosmopolitans", and Esperantists were imprisoned or executed for the remainder of Stalin's rule. The Soviet government did not officially condemn or outlaw the Esperanto movement in the Soviet Union, and the government did not officially acknowledge the persecution of Esperantists. Following the death of Joseph Stalin in 1953, active suppression of Esperanto ended. The following year, VOKS delivered a statement denying that Esperanto was illegal in the Soviet Union. In 1954, the Soviet Union did not oppose a measure for UNESCO to recognize the Universal Esperanto Association.

== Soviet Esperantists ==
Esperanto was historically regarded by the socialist movement as a potential international language for workers, resulting in relative popularity of the language in the early years of the Soviet Union. The prevalence of Esperanto groups expanded considerably between 1917-1921, seeking to undertake a worldwide Esperanto revolution to accompany a Communist revolution. The government seized a mansion and granted it to the Esperanto community as the Esperanto House. Several international advocates of Esperanto also resided in the Soviet Union for periods of time in the 1920s to help promote the language, including founding Sennacieca Asocio Tutmonda members Robert Guiheneuf and Lucien Laurat. According to E. J. Dillon, Esperanto was the fourth most common foreign language taught in Soviet schools by 1929 after English, German, and French.

The Esperanto movement in the early years of the Soviet Union was divided as to whether Esperanto should comply with Soviet ideology and to whether its focus should be national or international. In 1929, there were an estimated 5,726 Esperantists in the Soviet Union, though the Soviet Esperantist Union (SEU) claimed that there were 16,066. Vasili Eroshenko was a notable Soviet writer that wrote in Esperanto. Soviet Esperantists began suffering persecution when Dmitrii Snezhko was arrested, though the Esperantist community was not aware of this persecution until several more leaders of the movement were arrested in 1938. Other Esperantists, such as poet Georgii Deshkin, were exiled to Siberia.

While government persecution of Esperantists ended with Stalin's death, the population of Esperantists has been significantly reduced in the Soviet Union. Contact between Soviet Esperantists and the global Esperantist community was restored in the 1950s. A World Youth Festival was held in Moscow in 1957, bringing together Esperantists from 26 countries. A Soviet delegation to the World Congress of Esperanto was formed in 1963. A national Esperantist organization was not formed until 1979.

=== Soviet Esperantist Union (1921) ===
The Soviet Esperantist Union was established in 1921 to unify Esperantists in the Soviet Union with Ernest Drezen as its leader. Drezen advocated the use of Esperanto to establish communication between Soviet workers and the workers of other countries, and thousands of letters were sent between Communist groups in the 1920s. By the late 1920s, SEU membership grew to 10,000 people. To promote the use of Esperanto, the SEU published guidelines on writing letters in the language that could then be shared with the press. This correspondence strategy began to experience backlash in the late 1920s when exchanged between Soviet and foreign socialists suggested that working conditions under capitalism were not worse than those under the Soviet Union or otherwise suggested that the Communist revolution had not been successful.

The SEU changed its strategy in the 1930s, focusing less on messaging and more on practical use of the language. Rather than using Esperanto as a revolutionary language, the group encouraged its use as a hobby and in everyday life. Membership of the SEU increased during the mid-1930s, but the SEU was targeted as part of the Stalinist purge against Esperanto. The group was not officially disbanded, as the Soviet government instead targeted members until operations could no longer continue. In the purge the leader of the Soviet Esperantist Union, Ernest Drezen, was executed by gunshot on 27 October 1937. Drezen's reputation was rehabilitated by the USSR in 1957, and he was posthumously readmitted to the Communist Party in 1989.

=== Association of Soviet Esperantists (1979) ===
The suppression of Esperantists gradually decreased and organizations were allowed to form. In 1969 a Soviet Esperantist Youth Movement was formed, and the Association of Soviet Esperantists in 1979. The association had limited reach even compared to Esperantist groups in other Communist Bloc countries.

== See also ==
- Esperanto workers movement
- Interhelpo
- Mikhail Bronshtein, Soviet and Russian Esperantist

== Bibliography ==
- Forster, Peter G. (1982). The Esperanto Movement. ISBN 9789027933997.
- Lins, Ulrich (2016). Dangerous Language — Esperanto Under Hitler and Stalin. Palgrave Macmillan. ISBN 9781349715053.
- Lins, Ulrich (2017). Dangerous Language — Esperanto and the Decline of Stalinism. Palgrave Macmillan. ISBN 9781352000207.
- Sutton, Geoffrey (2008). Concise Encyclopedia of the Original Literature of Esperanto, 1887-2007. Mondial. ISBN 9781595690906.
