= Nikolai Vladimirovich Nekrasov =

Esperanto writer and critic

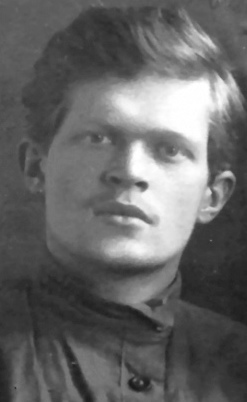
Nikolai Vladimirovich Nekrasov

Nikolai Vladimirovich Nekrasov (Russian: Николай Владимирович Некрасов) (18 December 1900 – 4 October 1938) was a Soviet Esperanto writer, translator, and critic.

== Biography ==
Nekrasov was born in Moscow. A journalist, he worked in the publishing house Moscow worker. He learned Esperanto in 1915.

=== Esperanto activity, editorial work, and articles ===
In 1918–19, he was president of the Tutrusia Ligo de junaj esperantistoj (All-Russia League of Young Esperantists), and editor and typesetter of Juna Mondo (Young World). On 1 June 1922 Nekrasov together with Gregory Demidyuk founded the cultural review La Nova Epoko (The New Epoch), which became one of the organs of SAT. In 1923 he became a member of the Central Committee of Sovetlanda Esperantista Unuiĝo (SEU) (ru: Soyuz Esperantistov Sovetskikh Stran), then under the leadership of Ernest Drezen.

He was especially concerned with the history and criticism of Esperanto literature, the ideology of the proletarian revolutionary Esperanto movement, the nationality problem and cosmoglottics. In La Nova Epoko he published several essays on Esperanto literature (about Baghy, Bulthuis, Teodor Jung, Nikolai Hohlov, Mikhalski, Devkin, Schulhof, and others). His critiques set out mainly from an original sociological viewpoint, but he simultaneously paid much attention to the use of language in the works.

In the early 1930s he actively participated in the compilation and preparation of material on literature for the Enciklopedio de Esperanto. He also published many of Zamenhof's letters.

In 1931 he was one of the cofounders of IAREV (International Association of Revolutionary Esperanto Writers), and edited its first newspaper, La Nova Etapo (The New Stage).

=== Arrest, execution, and rehabilitation ===
Nekrasov was arrested in 1938, and accused of being "an organizer and leader of a fascist, espionage, terrorist organization of Esperantists". For this crime he was shot to death on 4 October 1938. His archive and library were obliterated; presumably many of his unpublished works and translations thus perished.

He was posthumously rehabilitated as innocent on 26 November 1957.

== Works ==
=== Translated poetry ===
- Kupra rajdanto (Copper rider) by Pushkin.
- Eŭgeno Onegin (Eugene Onegin) by Aleksandr Pushkin, SAT, 1931.
- Dekdu (Twelve) and Najtingala ĝardeno (Nightingale garden) by Alexander Blok.
- Blanka cigno (White swan) and La mortaj ŝipoj (The dead ships) by Konstantin Bal'mont.
- Nubo en pantalono (Cloud in pants) and Suno (Sun) by Vladimir Majakovskij.
- Monna Liza, by Gerasimov.
- Socialismo and Patrino (Mother) by Bezimenskij.

=== Translated prose ===
- Ruĝa Stelo (The Red Star), by Aleksander Bogdanov, SAT, 1929. (with others)
- La Vojo de formiĝo kaj disvastiĝo de la lingvo internacia (The way of formation and spread of the international language), by Ernest Drezen, SAT, 1929
- Historio de la mondolingvo (History of the world Language, by Drezen, EKRELO.

=== Original poetry ===
- Fablo pri ĝilotinŝraŭbeto (Fabel of a little gelaten-screw), appeared in Sennacieca Revuo
- Testamento de Satano (Testament of Satan)
- Verda flamo (Green flame)
- Krono de sonetoj pri Esperanto (Crown of Sonnets), a commection of poems
- Mi moskvano (I, a Muscovite), appeared in Internacia Literaturo

=== Original prose ===
- Bibliografio de Esperantaj presaĵoj en USSR dum 12 jaroj de la revolucio 1917-1928, Moscow, 1928 (A bibliography of esperanto material in print in the USSR during the 12 years of the revolution 1917–1928)
- Tra USSR per Esperanto (Through the USSR by means of Esperanto)
- Several essays on Esperanto-literaturo in La Nova Epoko (in Esperanto)

Nekrasov believed that in his original poems he followed the Russian symbolist poets, especially Bryusov, and so he took special care with the purity of his language style. It is known that the largest of his original works was the grand poem "Kazanovo" (en:Casanova) — which according to the impressions of those who read the manuscript, was at a very high level poetically. At least one copy of the manuscript still existed in the beginning of the 1960s, but later disappeared without a trace.

== Quotes ==
"Art is a hammer to beat the world, not a mirror to reflect it."

== Works readable on line ==
- Sennaciismo... burĝa?, from Sennacieca Revuo (Non-national review), 1924

== Sources ==
The original version of this article is a translation of the corresponding Esperanto language article in Vikipedio.
