= Brownstein =

Brownstein is a surname of mixed origin. The name is composed of the English word "brown" and the German word "stein" (meaning "stone"). Notable people with the surname include:

- Alec Brownstein (born 1980), American writer
- Carrie Brownstein (born 1974), American musician and actress
- Irwin Brownstein (1930–1996), New York politician and judge
- Louis Brownstein, better known as Lew Brown (1893–1958), American lyricist

== See also ==
- Braunstein
- Brownstone (surname)
- Bronstein
