= Bulthuis =

Bulthuis is a surname. Notable people with the surname include:

- Dave Bulthuis (born 1990), Dutch footballer
- Hendrik Bulthuis (1865–1945), Dutch customs official, writer, and translator
