= Drezen =

Drezen is a surname. Individuals with the surname include:

- Anna Drezen, American writer, actress, and comedian
- Ernest Drezen, Soviet Esperantist and engineer
- Youenn Drezen, Breton nationalist and author

== See also ==
- Dražen, male given name of the same origin
