= Braunstein =

Braunstein (German: brown stone) is a German surname. Notable people with the name include:

- Alexander E. Braunstein (1902–1986), Soviet biochemist
- Edward Braunstein (born 1981), American politician
- Guy Braunstein (born 1971), Israeli-American conductor
- Ilia Braunstein (1908–1980), Belgian philatelist
- Jacques Braunstein (1939–2009), Venezuelan musician
- Mark Mathew Braunstein (born 1951), American writer
- Natasha Lyonne (Natasha Braunstein; born 1979), American actress
- Néstor Braunstein (1941–2022), Argentine-Mexican physician
- Paul Braunstein (born 1970), Canadian actor
- Peter Braunstein (born 1964), American rapist
- Pierre Braunstein (born 1947), French chemist
- Ronald Braunstein (born 1955), American orchestral conductor
- Ron Braunstein (curler) (born c.1940), Canadian curler
- Necro (rapper) (Ron Braunstein; born 1976), American rapper; brother of Ill Bill
- Rubin Braunstein (1922–2018), American physicist
- Samuel L. Braunstein (born 1961), Australian professor
- Terry Braunstein (born 1939), Canadian curler
- Terry Braunstein (artist) (born 1942), photomontage artist
- Ill Bill (William Braunstein; born 1972), American rapper

== Other uses ==
- Toot Braunstein, character of Drawn Together
- Braunstein (game), a game considered to be the ancestor of role-playing games
- Braunstein–Ghosh–Severini entropy, quantum mechanical entropy

== See also ==
- Bronstein
- Brownstein
- Brownstone
