= Adam Itzel Jr. =

American conductor and composer

Adam Itzel Jr. (November 30, 1864 – September 5, 1893) was a 19th-century American conductor, pianist, and composer active in Baltimore.

== Early life ==
He attended the Peabody Institute's Conservatory of Music, earning a certificate of proficiency in 1880 and (along with Hermine Hoen) the conservatory's first graduate degree 1882. He was the conductor of the Academy of Music's orchestra, and directed the touring McCall Opera Company. In 1890 he was hired to teach and conduct at Peabody.

Composer Eliza Woods was one of his students.

Itzel's best-known composition was the light opera The Tar and the Tartar. It premiered in Chicago in April 1891 with Digby Bell and Helen Bertram in the leads, then ran for 152 performances at New York's Palmer Theater. The show was not a critical success, but enjoyed popular success due to Bertram's scandalous barefoot dance. The show was performed across the continent by at least six companies. After his death, it ran again for a week in 1894 at New York's Union Square Theater with Milton Aborn in the lead role.

Adam Itzel died at the age of 29 of consumption in Baltimore, Maryland, September 5, 1893. A memorial concert was held at Peabody in February 1894; Daniel Gilman gave the commemorative address. The Peabody Archives at Johns Hopkins University hold his archives.

== Selected works ==
- The Tar and the Tartar (libretto by Harry B. Smith)
- Jack Sheppard (3-act opera, libretto by A. K. Fulton)
- untitled 3-act opera, libretto by W. Day
- The Baltimore (song, "Dedicated by The Sun of Baltimore to the gallant worship that beras the name of the Monumental City", commemorating the launch of the USS Baltimore (C-3))
