= Richard Johnson (pianist) =

Richard D. Johnson
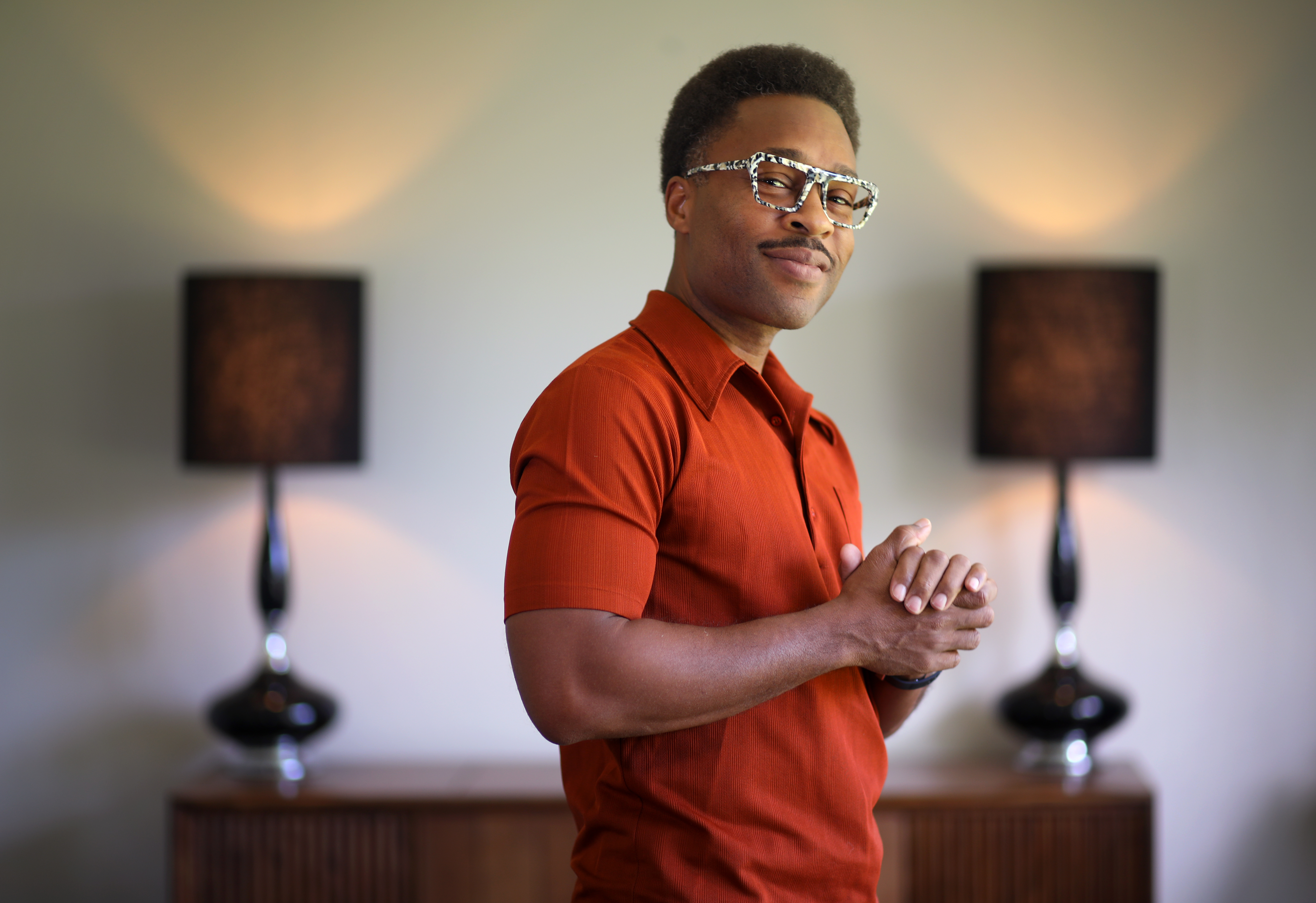

Background information
- Born: Richard Doron Johnson; August 20th 1975; Pittsburgh, PA
- Genre: Jazz
- Occupation: Musician
- Instruments: Piano, clarinet
- Years active: 1995 to present
- Website: rjjazz.com

Richard Doron Johnson is an American composer, jazz pianist, and music professor. He is a Jazz professor at the Peabody Conservatory of Music in Baltimore. Johnson often plays at music venues and jazz festivals such as the Detroit International Jazz Festival, Marciac France jazz festival, Chicago Jazz Festival and Hyde Park Jazz Festival.

== Background ==
Johnson was introduced to music at an early age, specifically the piano, by his father, a gospel pianist from Baltimore. Immediately after being born in Pittsburgh, Richard’s family moved to Canfield, Ohio where they lived until 1984. After living here they moved to Harrisburg, Pennsylvania where he played trumpet in middle school and valve trombone in high school until 10th grade. In 1991, Due to Richard’s fathers job they were transferred again to Boxford, Massachusetts where he graduated from Masconomet High School in Topsfield.

Richard Johnson’s alma maters are the Berklee College of Music, where he graduated in a mere two years, and the Boston Conservatory of Music, where he received a music scholarship and his Master’s Degree in Jazz Pedagogy.

== Career ==
Johnson received an Artist Performance Diploma at Thelonious Monk Institute of Jazz Performance at New England Conservatory (now Herbie Hancock Institute). From 2000 to 2003, he was a member of Wynton Marsalis’ Septet and the Jazz Lincoln Center Orchestra. He was also part of the Russell Malone Quartet, Delfeayo Marsalis Quintet, and the Bobby Watson Quartet. After time spent with those groups, Johnson started the Reach Afar Program, catered to those aged 7 to 17, educating them on the connection between jazz and hip-hop. In 1999, he was named United States Musical Ambassador and did six state department tours across the world from Latin America to the Middle East, totaling more than 76 countries. Johnson has also performed along the sides of jazz icons like Herbie Hancock, Wayne Shorter, and Arturo Sandoval. In 2005, he became a musical director for the Atlanta Hawks. This position allowed him the chance to put together a Hip-Hop instrumental quartet which performed during the in game play for all 92 season games.

In 2015 Johnson became the Jazz Ambassador of the Jazz at Lincoln Center Doha Club at the St Regis Hotel. Currently, Johnson serves as a Jazz professor at the Peabody Conservatory of Music in Baltimore and piano instructor for the Ravina Jazz Program in Chicago. He has had four musical releases, with his current project titled 2 of A Kind, co-led with Gregory Generet, featuring a talented jazz ensemble with Freddie Hendrix on trumpet, Jon Beshay on tenor saxophone, Barry Stephenson on Bass, and Henry Conerway on drums.

== Discography ==
=== As leader ===
- "Stride Ways" 1998
- "Battle Grounds" (SteepleChase, 2010)
- "Here I am" 2013
- "Music Business" 2017

=== As sideman/contributor ===
- "United We Swing-" 2019 Wynton Marsalis
- "Check Cashing Day " 2013 Bobby Watson
- "Soul House" 2008 Christian Winther (SteepleChase)
- "The Only Plan" 2011 Christian Winther (SteepleChase)
- "Jam Session" 2006 (SteepleChase)
- "Jam Session" 2005 (SteepleChase)
- " Half Past Autumn" Irvin Mayfield 2003 Basin Street records
- " How Passion Falls" Irvin Mayfield 2001 Basin Street Records
