= Borensztein =

Borensztein is a surname. Notable people with the surname include:

- Leon Borensztein (born 1947), American photographer
- Mauricio Borensztein (1927–1996), Argentine film, theatre, and television comedian
- Sebastián Borensztein (born 1963), Argentine writer and director

== See also ==
- Borenstein
- Borenshtein
