= Ron Kimmel =

Israeli computer scientist (born 1963)

- רון קימל
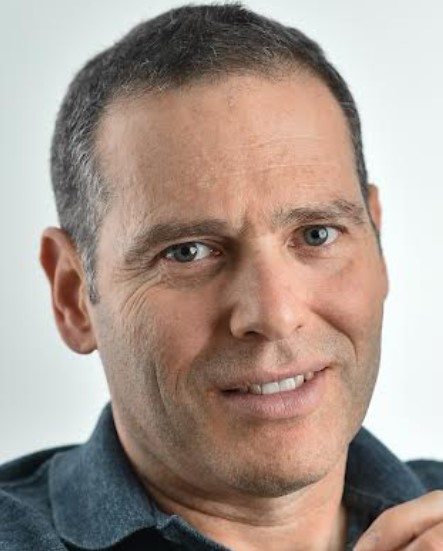
- Ron Kimmel 2024
- Born: 1963 (age 62–63); Haifa, Israel
- Known for: Geodesic Active Contours; Image Segmentation; Non-rigid shape analysis Computer aided diagnostics Intel RealSense technology
- Awards: SIAM Fellow 2019; IEEE Fellow 2009; Helmholtz-Test of Time-Award 2013
- Scientific career
- Fields: Mathematics, Computer Science, Engineering
- Workplaces: Technion, UC Berkeley, Stanford
- Doctoral advisor: Alfred Bruckstein, Nahum Kiryati

Ron Kimmel (Hebrew: רון קימל; born 1963) is a professor of Computer Science and Electrical and Computer Engineering (by courtesy) at the Technion Israel Institute of Technology. He holds a D.Sc. degree in electrical engineering (1995) from the Technion and was a post-doc at UC Berkeley and Berkeley Labs, and a visiting professor at Stanford University. He has worked in various areas of image and shape analysis in computer vision, image processing, and computer graphics. Kimmel's interest in recent years has been non-rigid shape processing and analysis, medical imaging, computational biometry, deep learning, numerical optimization of problems with a geometric flavor, and applications of metric and differential geometry. Kimmel is an author of two books, an editor of one, and an author of numerous articles. He is the founder of the Geometric Image Processing Lab , and a founder and advisor of several successful image processing and analysis companies.

Kimmel's contributions include the development of fast marching methods for triangulated manifolds (together with James Sethian), the geodesic active contours algorithm for image segmentation, a geometric framework for image filtering (named Beltrami flow after the Italian mathematician Eugenio Beltrami), and the Generalized Multidimensional Scaling (together with his students the Bronstein brothers) with which he was able to compute the Gromov-Hausdorff distance between surfaces. He is one of the founders of the field of deep learning based computational oncology/pathology together with his student Gil Shamai.

In 2003, he appeared in an interview to WNBC on the use of geometric approaches in three-dimensional face recognition. In 2011, Intel acquired his cofounded company InVision. For ten years he played a leading role in the research and development of Intel RealSense technologies, as a part-time Intel senior academic research fellow. In 2022 he cofounded Lumana.AI , where he serves as a chief scientific officer.

== Research and career ==
Kimmel's research interests include medical imaging, computer graphics, computer vision, deep learning, and image processing.

=== Entrepreneurship and industry ===
In 2010, Kimmel co-founded InVision, serving as Technical Lead. The company pioneered structured-light depth-sensing technology which was transferred from the Technion's Geometric Image Processing (GIP) lab.

Following Intel's acquisition of InVision in late 2011, Kimmel served as a Distinguished Academic Researcher for the company until 2021. During this tenure, he led research that contributed to the development of the Intel RealSense product line. The sensors resulting from this work have been integrated into various modern robotic platforms, including the Boston Dynamics Spot, Xiaomi CyberDog, and Unitree GO2.

Kimmel also co-founded CathAlert and VideoCites, leveraging expertise in video analytics for content analysis solutions. In 2022, he co-founded Lumana, a company focusing on video analytics platforms, where he currently serves as Chief Scientific Officer (CSO).

== Refs ==
[1] "Vita - Ron Kimmel"

[2] "Intel R RealSense SR300 Coded light depth Camera TM - Technion"

== Awards ==
- The Weizmann Prize for exact sciences, outstanding research by Israeli scientists, 2025
- SIAM Fellow for contributions to shape reconstruction, image processing, and geometric analysis, 2019
- SIAG Imaging Science Best Paper Prize for SIAM J. Imaging Science'2013. Scale invariant geometry for non-rigid shapes, 2016
- Helmholtz Prize (ICCV Test-of-Time Award) for his 1995 paper on Geodesic Active Contours, 2013
- IEEE Fellow for his contributions to image processing and non-rigid shape analysis, 2009
- Counter Terrorism Award, 2003
- Henry Taub Prize, 2001
- Hershel Rich innovation award, 2001, 2003
- Alon Fellowship, 1998–2001

== Books ==
- "Numerical Geometry of Images" published in 2003 by Springer
- "Numerical Geometry of Non-Rigid Shapes" (with Alex and Michael Bronstein) published by Springer in 2009.
