= Esperanto workers movement =

Social movement which aimed to use Esperanto to develop and liberate the working class

The Esperanto workers movement (Laborista Esperanto-movado) has the goal of taking practical advantage of the international language Esperanto for advancing the goals of the labour movement, especially the fight against unrestrained capitalism. It is not only a political movement in the strict sense but also a cultural and educational one. Currently the principal Esperanto associations active in the Esperanto workers movement at the global level are the Sennacieca Asocio Tutmonda (SAT, "World Anational Association") and the Internacia Komunista Esperantista Kolektivo (IKEK, an international collective of communist Esperantists), and in a wider sense, the Monda Asembleo Socia (MAS, "World social assembly").

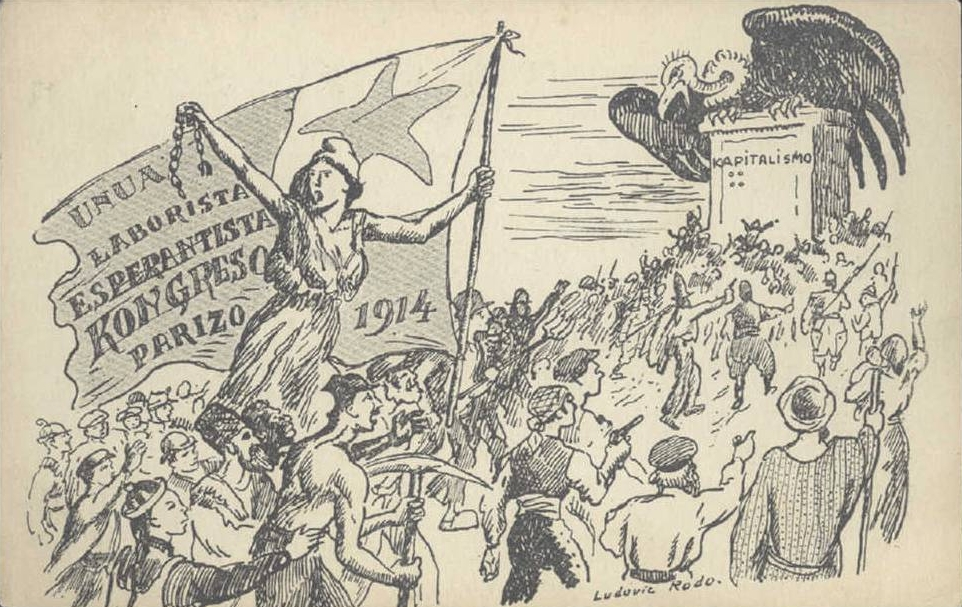
Postcard designed by Ludovic Rodo for the First Esperanto Workers Congress (Unua Laborista Esperanto-Kongreso), planned for Paris in 1914 but which never took place

== History ==
=== Labour movement ===
If scientists, business people and transport workers, who usually understood at least a few foreign languages, lacked multilingual opportunities and felt the need for an international language, it imposed a still greater need for global understanding among workers in the international labour movement, the majority of whom generally knew only their mother tongue. Those who first became aware of the value of Esperanto for themselves were mostly ordinary labourers; lacking formal training in grammar, with great effort they appropriated Esperanto for their own needs and pioneered the language's diffusion.

=== Local groups prior to World War I ===
The first Esperantist worker groups were founded between 1905 and 1908 in The Hague, Hamburg, Munich, Paris, Stockholm and elsewhere. In the United Kingdom, the British League of Esperanto Socialists was established in 1907, but there were apparently no local groups. In 1911, separate Esperantist workers associations were founded in Czechoslovakia, Germany and the Netherlands, and the national newspapers Antaŭen ("Forward", Germany), Arbeider-Esperantist ("Worker Esperantist," Netherlands), Kulturo ("Culture," Czechoslovakia) and Le travailleur Esperantiste ("The Esperantist worker," France) began publication; an international organ for worker Esperantists had already appeared earlier, begun by Marcelo Verema (the pseudonym of Paul Berthelot, 1881–1910). Berthelot published in 1906 the Rondiranta folio por la kreado de tutmonda Socia Revuo, a prospectus for the creation of a global social review. Later, pursuant to a resolution of the 1906 so-called Ruĝula Kongreseto ("Little conference of Reds"), held in Geneva, the first monthly issue of the Internacia Socia Revuo was published in January 1907. Editors included Fi-Blan-Go (the pseudonym of Fernand Blangarin, 1886–1914), from 1907 to 1909; Jacob Leendert Bruijn (1880–1954), from 1910 to 1911; and Wijtze Nutters (1872–1926), from 1912 to 1914. Sometimes, due to insufficient funds in the last part of the year, they were only able to publish once every two or three months, but by 1913 the number of subscribers had already surpassed 600, across nearly 20 countries; readers and collaborators were to be found even in tsarist Russia. Between 1912 and 1914 the publishing house of the Internacia Socia Revuo brought out a series of works by Berthelot, Enrico Ferri, Ferdinand Domela Nieuwenhuis, Peter Kropotkin, Ferdinand Lassalle, Wilhelm Liebknecht, Jack London, Silvio Gesell and Victor Hugo; D. J. Ivanski and Wijtze Nutters did significant translation work. With the outbreak of war in 1914 the Internacia Socia Revuo ceased publication; in 1920 Nutters tried to revive the magazine, but he only managed to produce six issues.

=== First global organization ===
A worldwide workers organization was established in 1906, the Internacia Asocio Paco-Libereco ("International peace and freedom association"), later known as Liberiga Stelo ("Liberating star"); the principal activists were Fi-Blan-Go and R. Louis. The goals were to resist militarism and capitalism and to spread Esperanto among internationalists, socialists and fighters for liberation and self-determination. The association published several pamphlets in opposition to militarism, nationalism and clericalism; these writings were its first Esperanto workers publications. However, the association, which accepted only individuals and local group as members, did not find many followers outside France. The Czech and German workers associations developed two different international organizational projects; both aimed at evolving their groups into an international conference of working Esperantists that would meet simultaneously with the 1914 tenth World Esperanto Congress (Universala Kongreso de Esperanto) in Paris, but this was not implemented. At the earlier World Congresses in Geneva (1906), Cambridge (1907), Antwerp (1911), Kraków (1912) and Bern (1913), the workers took part in special gatherings as the so-called Ruĝula Kongreseto ("Little conference of Reds"). These enabled awareness and exchange of experiences, but had no have practical results. In 1911, the Universal Esperanto Association tried to set up a special interest group for workers, but did not succeed. Generally, the Esperanto workers movement until 1914 worked mainly to promote the Esperanto language.

== After World War I ==
=== The founding of SAT ===
Coincident with the 1921 World Esperanto Congress in Prague, the Liberiga Stelo group, which included 80 participants from 75 countries, held its first world conference and decided to rename itself as the Sennacieca Asocio Tutmonda (SAT). Membership in SAT is on an individual basis; it does not have local or national sections. A characteristic feature of SAT's organization is that its leadership, the Ĝenerala Konsilantaro (General Council), elected by the entire membership, does not represent countries or nations but so-called sectors. In order to avoid the influence of nationalism on the leadership, the surface of the earth was divided into arbitrary sectors according to hours of the meridian, and the council had one representative chosen from each sector; that council then chose the governing board of the association, which it aids and advises. After 1933 the board, elected by the entire membership, also included representatives of the Esxperantist workers associations that signed a convention with SAT.

In 1924-25 SAT survived a small crisis. Several anarchist SAT members, distressed that SAT publications would not permit articles opposed to communism or to the Soviet Union, established their own organization, the Global League of Non-State Esperantists (Tutmonda Ligo de Esperantistaj Senŝtatanoj, TLES) and published a bimonthly periodical Libera Laboristo ("Free Worker"). Other groups were founded from time to time, including the Internacio de Proleta Esperantistaro ("Proletarian Esperantists International", founded in 1932) and Internacio de Socialistaj Esperantistoj "Socialist Esperantists International", 1933).

=== Persecutions in the USSR ===
While SAT was eventually banned or persecuted in the Eastern Bloc countries, except in Yugoslavia, where several congresses were held. Associations appeared in these countries that declared themselves as workers associations and that acted as part of the so-called neutral movement through Mondpaca Esperantista Unuiĝo ("United Esperantists for world peace"). After the collapse of the Soviet Union, however, this group disappeared, as well as many other Eastern European associations that no longer received support from their respective national governments.

== See also ==
- Interhelpo
