= Eliza Woods =

American classical composer

Eliza McCalmont Woods (November 28, 1872 – February 9, 1961) was an American composer, pianist, and recipient of the Peabody Diploma for Distinguished Musicianship.

== Career ==
A life-long resident of Baltimore, Maryland, Woods began studying at the Peabody Conservatory in 1886 with Asger Hamerik, Harold Randolph, Henry A. Allen, Adam Itzel Jr, and Philip L. Kahmer. She also studied with Ernest Hutcheson, who taught piano at the Juilliard School. Woods was one of the youngest students, and only the twelfth person, to receive the Peabody Diploma for Distinguished Musicianship in 1894. After her graduation, she taught piano at the Peabody Preparatory School until 1909, when she joined the Peabody Conservatory faculty. Woods retired as a full time teacher in 1943, but continued as an examiner and substitute at the Preparatory School for many years.

== Works ==
Her compositions include:

=== Chamber music ===
- Piano sonata
- String quartet
- "Way Down Upon the Sewanee River – Theme & Variations" (piano)

=== Musical theatre ===
- "Fairy Rose" (text by Virginia Woods Mackall; for children)
- "Runaway Song" (text by Virginia Woods Mackall; for children)

=== Orchestra ===
- Grand Opera Finale
- Overture

=== Vocal ===
- Songs
- Fugue for Two Choirs
- "The Sun and I" (text by Lucy Janney Miller)
