= Michael Bronstein =

Israeli computer scientist and entrepreneur

Michael Bronstein MAE FBCS FIEEE
- מיכאל ברונשטיין
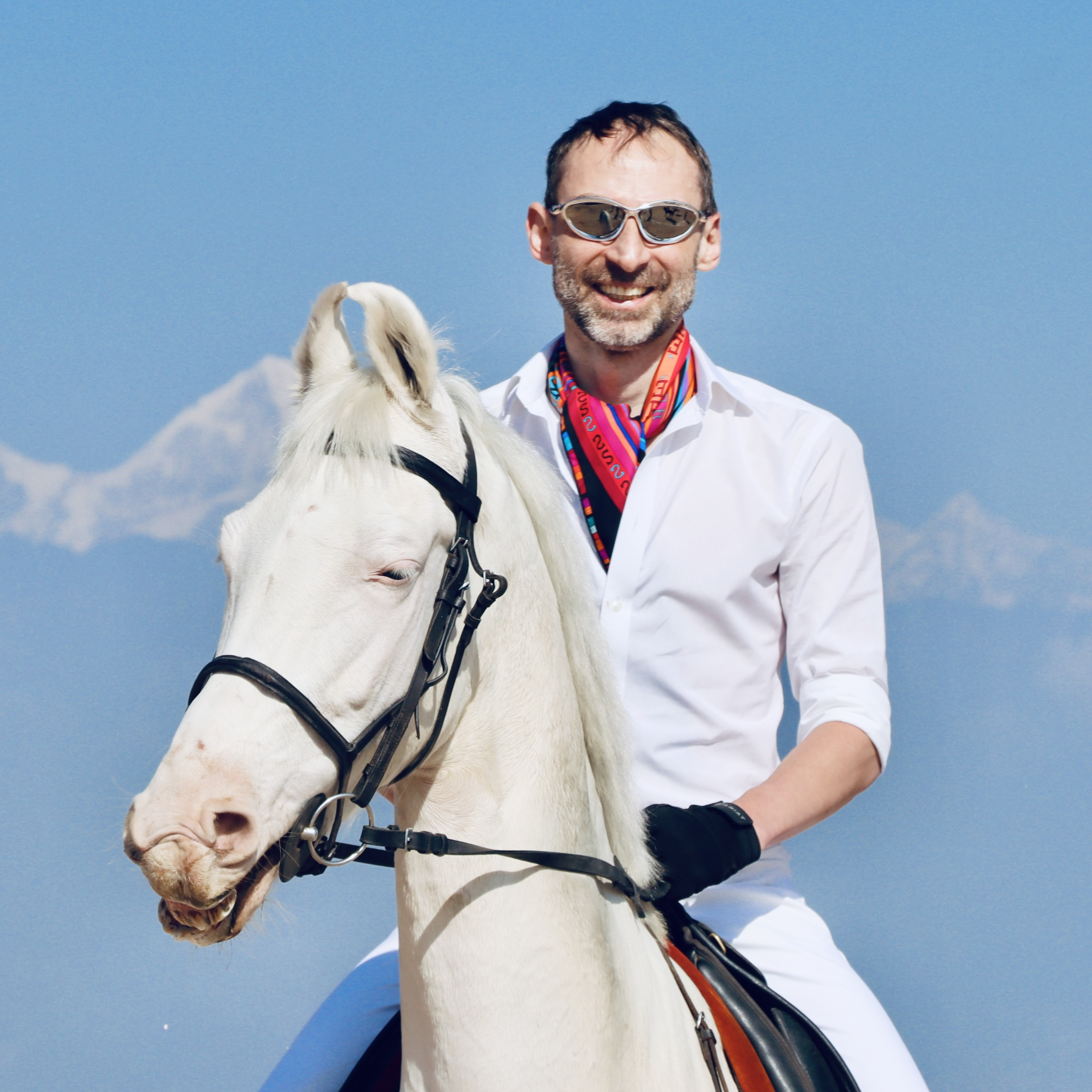
- Bronstein in 2024
- Born: 1980 (age 45–46); Tula, Russia
- Citizenship: Israel, United Kingdom
- Education: Technion
- Known for: Geometric deep learning Non-rigid shape analysis Intel RealSense technology
- Relatives: Alex Bronstein (brother)
- Awards: MAE 2020; Fellow BCS 2020; IEEE Fellow 2019; IAPR Fellow, 2018; Royal Society Wolfson Research Merit Award, 2018
- Scientific career
- Fields: Computer Science
- Workplaces: University of Oxford, Austrian Academy of Sciences, Imperial College London, University of Lugano, Harvard University
- Doctoral advisor: Ron Kimmel

Michael Bronstein (Hebrew: מיכאל ברונשטיין; Russian: Михаил Бронштейн; born 1980) is a British and Israeli computer scientist and entrepreneur. He is a computer science professor at the University of Oxford holding the DeepMind Chair in Artificial Intelligence and founding Scientific Director of Aithyra Institute at the Vienna Biocenter in Austria.

== Biography ==
Bronstein received his PhD from the Technion in 2007. Since 2010, he has been a professor at University of Lugano, Switzerland, affiliated with the Institute of Computational Science and IDSIA. Between 2018 and 2021, he held the Chair in Machine Learning and Pattern Recognition in the Department of Computing, Imperial College London. In 2022, he joined the Department of Computer Science at the University of Oxford as the DeepMind Professor of Artificial Intelligence.

Bronstein has held visiting appointments at Stanford University between 2009 and 2010, and at Harvard University and MIT between 2017 and 2018. He has been affiliated with the Radcliffe Institute for Advanced Study at Harvard University (as a Radcliffe fellow, 2017-2018), the Institute for Advanced Study at Technical University of Munich (as Rudolf Diesel industrial fellow, 2017-2019) and the Institute for Advanced Study in Princeton (as visitor, 2020). Since 2024, he is also a Professeur titulaire at EPFL and since 2025, an Honorary Professor at the University of Vienna and Technical University of Vienna.

Bronstein was a co-founder of the Israeli startup Invision, developing a coded-light 3D range sensor. The company was acquired by Intel in 2012 and has become the foundation of Intel RealSense technology. Bronstein served as Principal Engineer at Intel between 2012 and 2019.

In 2018, Bronstein founded Fabula AI, a London-based startup aiming to solve the problem of online disinformation by looking at how it spreads on social networks. The company was acquired by Twitter in 2019. He served as Head of Graph Learning Research at Twitter between 2019 and 2023.

== Work ==
Bronstein's research interests are broadly in theoretical and computational geometric methods for data analysis. His research encompasses a spectrum of applications ranging from machine learning, computer vision, and pattern recognition to geometry processing, computer graphics, and imaging. He is mainly known for his research on deformable 3D shape analysis and "geometric deep learning" (a term he coined), generalizing neural network architectures to manifolds and graphs. These methods have been applied to molecular design.

== Public appearances ==
- TEDx Warwick 2023
- ICLR 2021 keynote talk
- TEDx Lugano 2019 (with Kirill Veselkov)
- World Economic Forum 2015.

== Awards ==
- Turing World-Leading AI Research Fellowship, 2023
- Silver Medal of the Royal Academy of Engineering, 2020
- Fellow of the British Computer Society
- Member of the Academia Europaea, 2020
- IEEE Fellow, 2019
- Prix de la Fondation Dalle Molle, 2018
- Royal Society Wolfson Research Merit Award, 2018
- IAPR Fellow, 2018
- ACM Distinguished Speaker, 2015
- World Economic Forum Young Scientist, 2014
- Hershel Rich Technion Innovation Award, 2003

Bronstein is also the recipient of five ERC grants, two Google Faculty Research awards, and two Amazon AWS ML Research grants.

== Personal life ==
Bronstein is married with two children. He is the identical twin brother of Alex Bronstein.

== Publications ==
- "Numerical Geometry of Non-Rigid Shapes" (with Alex Bronstein and Ron Kimmel), Springer 2008.
- "Geometric deep learning: going beyond Euclidean data" (with Yann Lecun, Joan Bruna, Arthur Szlam and Pierre Vandergheynst), IEEE Signal Processing Magazine 2017.
