= Children of Orpheus =

1923 Esperanto novel by Hendrik Bulthuis

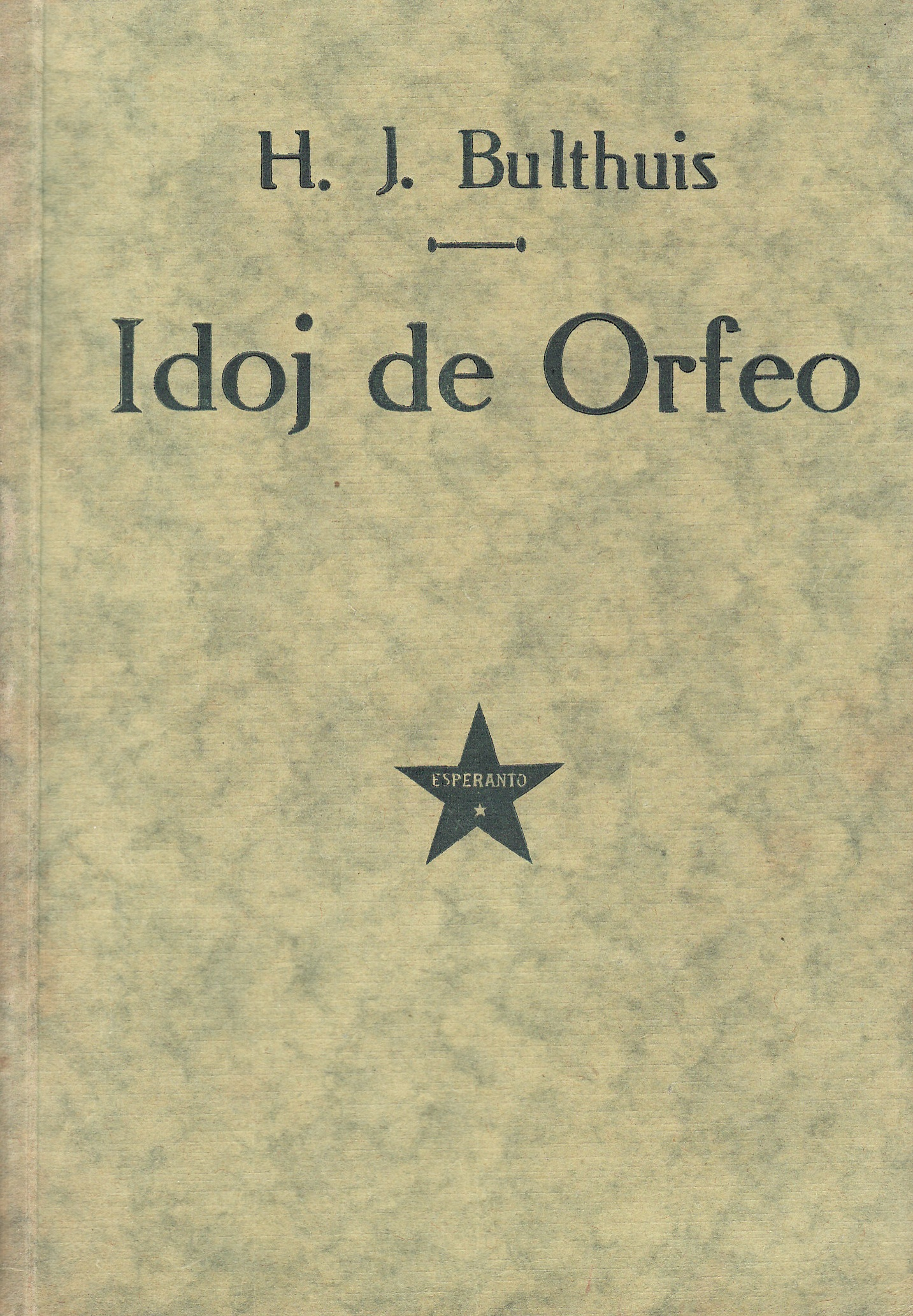
- First edition cover
- Author: Hendrik Bulthuis
- Original title: Idoj de Orfeo
- Language: Esperanto
- Genre: Novel
- Publisher: by author
- Publication date: 1923
- Publication place: Netherlands
- Media type: Print (hardback & paperback)
- Pages: 540 pp

Idoj de Orfeo (English: Children of Orpheus) is a novel written in Esperanto by Hendrik Bulthuis. It was published in 1923.

== Plot summary ==
=== Boy from the island ===
On an island there lived a solitary family, a father, a mother and a little boy. Once, a man named Johano swam to the island nude, since his ship had sailed off while he was bathing. The parents dressed him and hosted him for a month, during which time he told the boy fables and described continental cities. After he left, the boy ran away from home on a boat. When rescued by a ship, no one could understand his language. In port in Russia, the cook, Ivan, took him to see the city, but got drunk and was arrested, leaving the boy to sleep for several days in a cemetery, where he was found by other parents burying their own dead son. The parents then adopted him. The boy developed great musical talent, and he became a great violin master.

=== Boy in the village Brey ===
In the village Brey, Rika returns home one day to find a baby boy in a box on the table; she calls him Moses. It develops he too is very talented and becomes a violoncellist.

=== Boy in Prosen ===
In the Prussian city of Prosen a doctor is summoned to aid a dying circus worker. The circus worker dies, but a 16-year-old boy with a badly infected knee is discovered in his carriage. The doctor adopts him. He too is very talented and studies the piano.

=== Johano and the cook ===
Johano, the man who had visited the family on the island, encounters Ivan, the ship's cook who had been arrested. They learn that the boy from the island is looking for his parents, but has no idea even how to find the island they lived on. They manage to gather money and set off for Russia. On the way they encounter the boy who had been adopted by the doctor, at first confusing him with the boy that they were looking for. Johano arranges for his further study and they continue on their journey.

=== They meet ===
Four years later, in 1914 a concert was arranged in The Hague to which the three masters were invited: the violinist, the violoncellist, and the pianist. When they met, they were very shocked, since all three looked identical – even their friends could not tell them apart. But they could barely understand each other, as they spoke three different languages.

Just then Johano and Ivan appeared, and the detective work began. As it happened, the pianist, former circus boy, had in his possession a diary which had belonged to his mother. Johano recognized the language in the diary as Esperanto, and they began piecing together how the boys had gotten separated.

Johano found the father in an insane asylum in The Hague, and they were able to recall him to sanity with their music. Apparently, he too was a famous violoncellist. He and their mother had spoken Czech and Esperanto together. The mother and Rika were also found alive. Johano got the boys to learn Esperanto so that they could understand each other.

In the end they all left for the island, because the first boy wanted to meet with his adoptive parents. There they said goodbye to Johano, who it turned out, was not human at all, but a supernatural being, who had come to protect the three boys, children of Orpheus.
