= Alex Bronstein =

Russian-born Israeli-Italian computer scientist, engineer and entrepreneur

- אלכס ברונשטין
- Born: May 28, 1980 (age 46); Tula, Russian SFSR, Soviet Union
- Citizenship: Israel; Italy
- Education: Technion – Israel Institute of Technology
- Known for: Non-rigid shape analysis; 3D vision; Intel RealSense
- Relatives: Michael Bronstein (twin brother)
- Awards: IEEE Fellow (2018); Abarbanel Prize (2024)
- Scientific career
- Fields: Computer science, machine learning, computer vision, computational imaging
- Workplaces: Institute of Science and Technology Austria; Technion – Israel Institute of Technology; Tel Aviv University; Intel
- Doctoral advisor: Ron Kimmel

Alex (Alexander) Bronstein (born 28 May 1980) is a Russian-born Israeli-Italian computer scientist, electrical engineer, inventor, technology entrepreneur and angel investor. He is a professor at the Institute of Science and Technology Austria (ISTA) and a professor at the Technion – Israel Institute of Technology. His research spans non-rigid geometry and shape analysis, computer vision, computational imaging, machine learning, and applications of machine learning to the natural and life sciences. He is a Fellow of the Institute of Electrical and Electronics Engineers (IEEE) and of the European Laboratory for Learning and Intelligent Systems (ELLIS).

Bronstein contributed to early work on three-dimensional face recognition and to the development of 3D sensing technology that was acquired by Intel and developed within the RealSense program. He has co-founded and held technical leadership roles in technology companies including Novafora, VideoCites, Embryonics and Sibylla. He is also an angel investor in early-stage technology companies, including AKA Foods and the Italian machine-learning company Paradigma.

Bronstein joined the School of Electrical Engineering at Tel Aviv University in 2010, first as an assistant professor and later as an associate professor. He subsequently joined the Faculty of Computer Science at the Technion, becoming an associate professor in 2016 and professor in 2018. Since 2021 he has held the Dan Broida Academic Chair. He has also headed the Technion Center for Intelligent Systems and the VISTA laboratory.

After serving as a visiting professor at ISTA, Bronstein joined its faculty as a professor in 2024. His group develops computational and data-driven methods for problems in the natural and life sciences and engineering, with current work including molecular imaging and structural biology.

In November 2024, while teaching a visiting course at the University of Cagliari, Bronstein was the subject of protests by pro-Palestinian groups calling for a boycott of Israeli universities and objecting to his affiliation with the Technion. In an interview with CagliariToday, he said that the protesters had attributed political views to him on the basis of his nationality and institutional affiliation, stated that he had attempted to engage some of them in dialogue, and criticized what he described as the university leadership's "deafening silence". He nevertheless said that he intended to continue and expand his collaboration with the university. In October 2025, after the university's academic senate adopted a motion concerning relations with Israeli institutions and researchers supporting policies of the Israeli government, Bronstein publicly criticized the measure and offered to return the compensation he had received for his earlier teaching in Cagliari. Speaking in Cagliari on International Holocaust Remembrance Day in January 2026, he later connected the episode to concerns about academic freedom and political radicalization, while also expressing concern about internal division and moral erosion in Israel.

== Research ==
=== Non-rigid geometry and three-dimensional vision ===
Bronstein's early research focused on mathematical and computational methods for analyzing deformable three-dimensional objects. With Michael Bronstein and Ron Kimmel, he worked on geometric approaches to non-rigid shape comparison and recognition. This line of research was summarized in their 2008 book Numerical Geometry of Non-Rigid Shapes.

An early application was three-dimensional face recognition. In 2003, Alex and his identical twin brother Michael demonstrated geometric face-recognition methods using their own faces as a difficult test case. The work received international press coverage and helped draw attention to the use of 3D surface geometry for recognition.

Bronstein's later research broadened to computer vision, machine learning, signal processing, inverse problems and computational imaging. His group has applied these methods to modalities including medical ultrasound, magnetic resonance imaging, radar and electrical impedance tomography.

=== Machine learning for science and structural biology ===
At ISTA, Bronstein's research increasingly includes applications of machine learning to molecular imaging and structural biology, including protein structure, dynamics and function.

In 2026, Bronstein and collaborators published Experiment-guided AlphaFold3 resolves measurement-consistent protein ensembles in Nature Biotechnology. The work developed methods for guiding AlphaFold3 predictions with experimental measurements in order to obtain structures and structural ensembles consistent with experimental observations.

== Technology and entrepreneurship ==
Bronstein has combined academic research with work in technology companies. He held a technical leadership role at the Silicon Valley video-technology company Novafora, where he served as a scientist and vice president of video technology.

He was one of the inventors and developers of 3D sensing technology associated with the Israeli startup Invision. The technology was acquired by Intel, where Bronstein subsequently worked as a senior research scientist and principal engineer and contributed to the development of Intel's RealSense technology.

Bronstein co-founded VideoCites and served as its Chief Scientist. ISTA lists him as co-founder and Chief Scientist of VideoCites from 2015 to 2023.

He was also involved in the founding and technical development of Embryonics, a company applying machine learning to in-vitro fertilization.

Bronstein co-founded the UK fintech company Sibylla and serves as its Chief Scientist. UK Companies House records him as a director of Sibylla Ltd from its incorporation in September 2019.

== Angel investment ==
Bronstein is an angel investor in early-stage technology companies. CB Insights identifies him as an individual angel investor in AKA Foods, whose $17.2 million 2025 financing round was led by Alex and Michael Bronstein. He also serves as Chief Scientist of AKA Foods.

In 2026, Corriere della Sera and 01net identified Bronstein among the private or angel investors in the Rome-based machine-learning startup Paradigma.

== Awards and honors ==
- 2012 – Krill Prize for Excellence in Scientific Research, Wolf Foundation.
- 2013 – European Research Council Starting Grant.
- 2018 – Fellow of the Institute of Electrical and Electronics Engineers (IEEE).
- 2019 – European Research Council Consolidator Grant.
- 2020 – Fellow of the European Laboratory for Learning and Intelligent Systems (ELLIS).
- 2021 – Schmidt Career Advancement Chair in Artificial Intelligence.
- 2024 – Abarbanel Prize in Applied Mathematics, Israel Mathematical Union.

== Selected works ==
- Bronstein, Alexander M.; Bronstein, Michael M.; Kimmel, Ron (2008). Numerical Geometry of Non-Rigid Shapes. Springer.
- Maddipatla, S. A.; Sellam, N. E.; Bojan, M. I.; Masalitin, V.; Vedula, S.; Schanda, P.; Marx, A.; Bronstein, A. M. (2026). "Experiment-guided AlphaFold3 resolves measurement-consistent protein ensembles". Nature Biotechnology. doi:10.1038/s41587-026-03166-5.

== See also ==
- Computer vision
- Image processing
- Technion
