= Music schools in the United States =

There are various types of music schools in the United States. These include both pre-college and college-level schools, both private and public. College-level schools can be categorized as independent conservatories, or as music schools of larger universities or liberal arts colleges.

== Pre-college ==
Many major conservatories and music schools in the United States also carry a preparatory program, which trains elementary school-age children and high school-age youths in music performance, dance, or other artistic endeavors. There are also boarding preparatory schools in the US that offer pre-professional training in music, including Crossroads School, Idyllwild Arts Academy, Interlochen Center for the Arts, and Walnut Hill School.

== Independent conservatories ==
Independent conservatories are schools of music which are not part of a larger institution.

Classical conservatories in the United States include:

- Curtis Institute of Music (Philadelphia, PA)
- The Juilliard School (New York, NY)
- New England Conservatory (Boston, MA)
- Cleveland Institute of Music (Cleveland, OH)
- Boston Conservatory at Berklee (Boston, MA)
- The Colburn School (Los Angeles, CA)
- San Francisco Conservatory of Music (San Francisco, CA)
- Manhattan School of Music (New York, NY)
- New World Symphony Orchestra, (Miami, FL) (for music school graduates)

Contemporary music (Jazz and popular styles) conservatories include:

- Berklee College of Music (Boston, Massachusetts)
- Los Angeles Music Academy College of Music (Los Angeles, CA)
- The New School for Jazz and Contemporary Music (New York, New York)
- New England Conservatory (Boston, MA) (Jazz and Contemporary Improvisation/Jazz Composition)
- Musicians Institute (Los Angeles, CA)

== Conservatories at liberal arts colleges ==
Some liberal arts colleges in the United States, including Bard College, Lawrence University, and Oberlin College, have attached conservatories, which function with some degree of independence. The Oberlin Conservatory of Music, one such institution, is the oldest continually operating conservatory in the United States.

== Music schools within larger universities ==
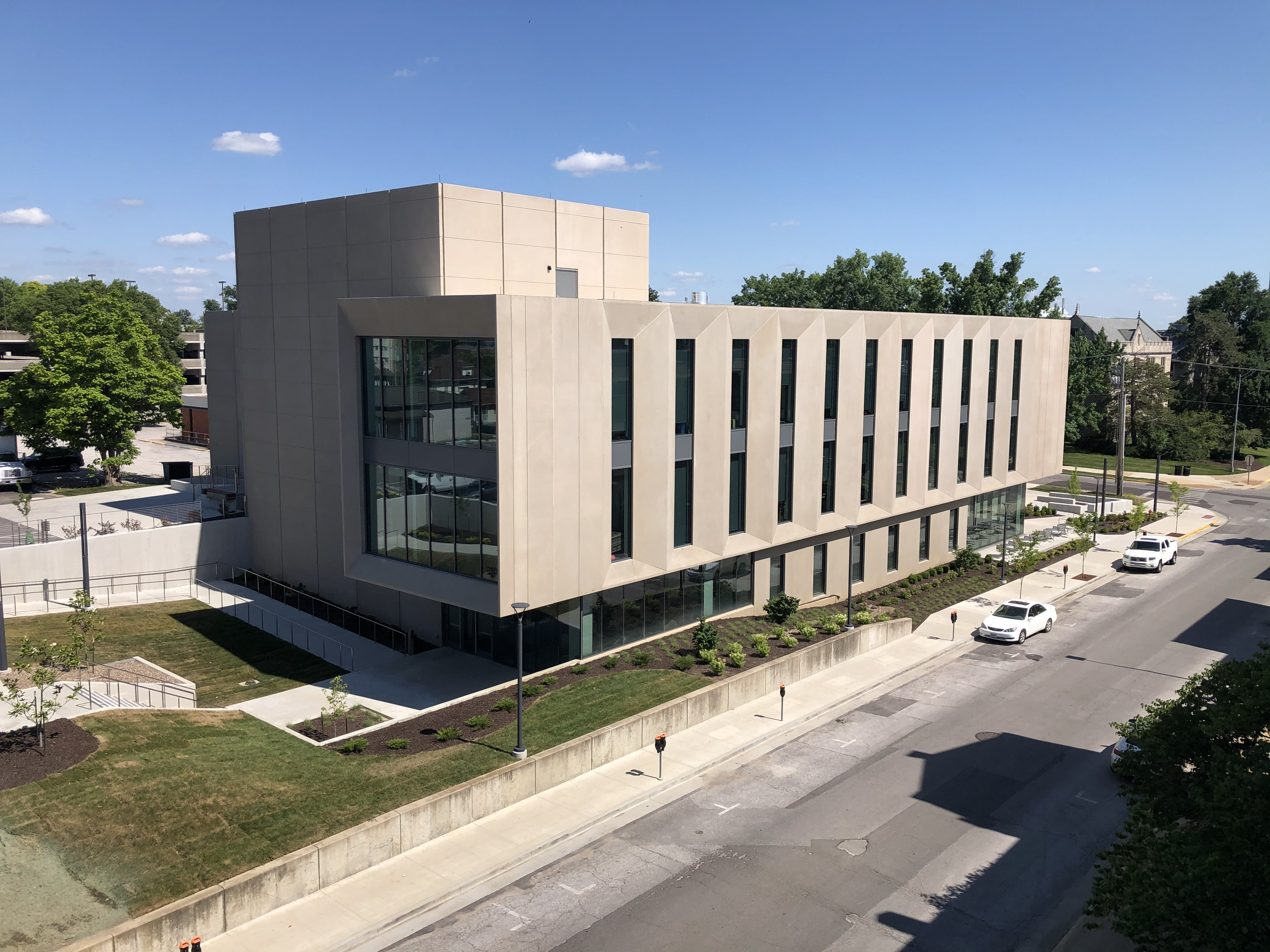
The University of Missouri School of Music, a typical institution embedded in a large public university

Many universities in the United States have schools of music. Some of these music schools refer to themselves as conservatories, and some were founded as independent conservatories before later becoming affiliated with a larger institution; one such example is the Peabody Institute of the Johns Hopkins University. Some conservatories affiliated with universities, such as the Peabody Institute and the Eastman School of Music (at the University of Rochester), are located on separate campuses from their parent institutions.

=== List of music schools within larger universities ===
- Bienen School of Music of Northwestern University (Evanston, IL)
- Blair School of Music of Vanderbilt University (Nashville, TN)
- Boston University School of Music (Boston, MA)
- Boyer College of Music and Dance of Temple University (Philadelphia, PA)
- Carnegie Mellon School of Music at Carnegie Mellon University (Pittsburgh, PA)
- Chicago College of Performing Arts at Roosevelt University (Chicago, Illinois)
- College of Music and the Performing Arts at Belmont University
- Conservatory of Music at University of the Pacific (Stockton, CA)
- Eastman School of Music at University of Rochester (Rochester, NY)
- Florida State University College of Music (Tallahassee, FL)
- Herb Alpert School of Music at University of California Los Angeles (Los Angeles, CA)
- Hugh Hodgson School of Music at University of Georgia (Athens, GA)
- Ithaca College School of Music (Ithaca, NY)
- Jacobs School of Music at Indiana University (Bloomington, IN)
- Lamont School of Music at University of Denver (Denver, CO)
- Mannes College The New School for Music of The New School (New York, NY)
- Mary Pappert School of Music of Duquesne University (Pittsburgh, PA)
- The College of Music at Michigan State University (East Lansing, MI)
- Moores School of Music of the University of Houston (Houston TX)
- Osher School of Music at the University of Southern Maine (Portland, ME)
- Peabody Institute of Johns Hopkins University (Baltimore, MD)
- Sarah and Ernest Butler School of Music of The University of Texas at Austin (Austin, TX)
- Shepherd School of Music at Rice University (Houston, Texas)
- The Hartt School at University of Hartford (West Hartford, CT)
- Thornton School of Music of the University of Southern California (Los Angeles, CA)
- UNCG School of Music, Theatre and Dance (Greensboro, NC)
- University of Cincinnati College-Conservatory of Music (Cincinnati, OH)
- University of Miami Frost School of Music (Miami, FL)
- University of Michigan School of Music, Theatre & Dance (Ann Arbor, MI)
- University of Missouri School of Music (Columbia, Missouri)
- University of North Texas College of Music (Denton, Texas)
- Yale School of Music of Yale University (New Haven, CT)

== Music majors at other colleges ==
Some universities, although they do not have a separate school of music, have music departments and offer music majors or concentrations. Such universities include Harvard, Columbia, Princeton, and Brown, as Yale is the only Ivy League university with a separate music school.
