= Boston Conservatory at Berklee =

Private performing arts conservatory in Boston, Massachusetts

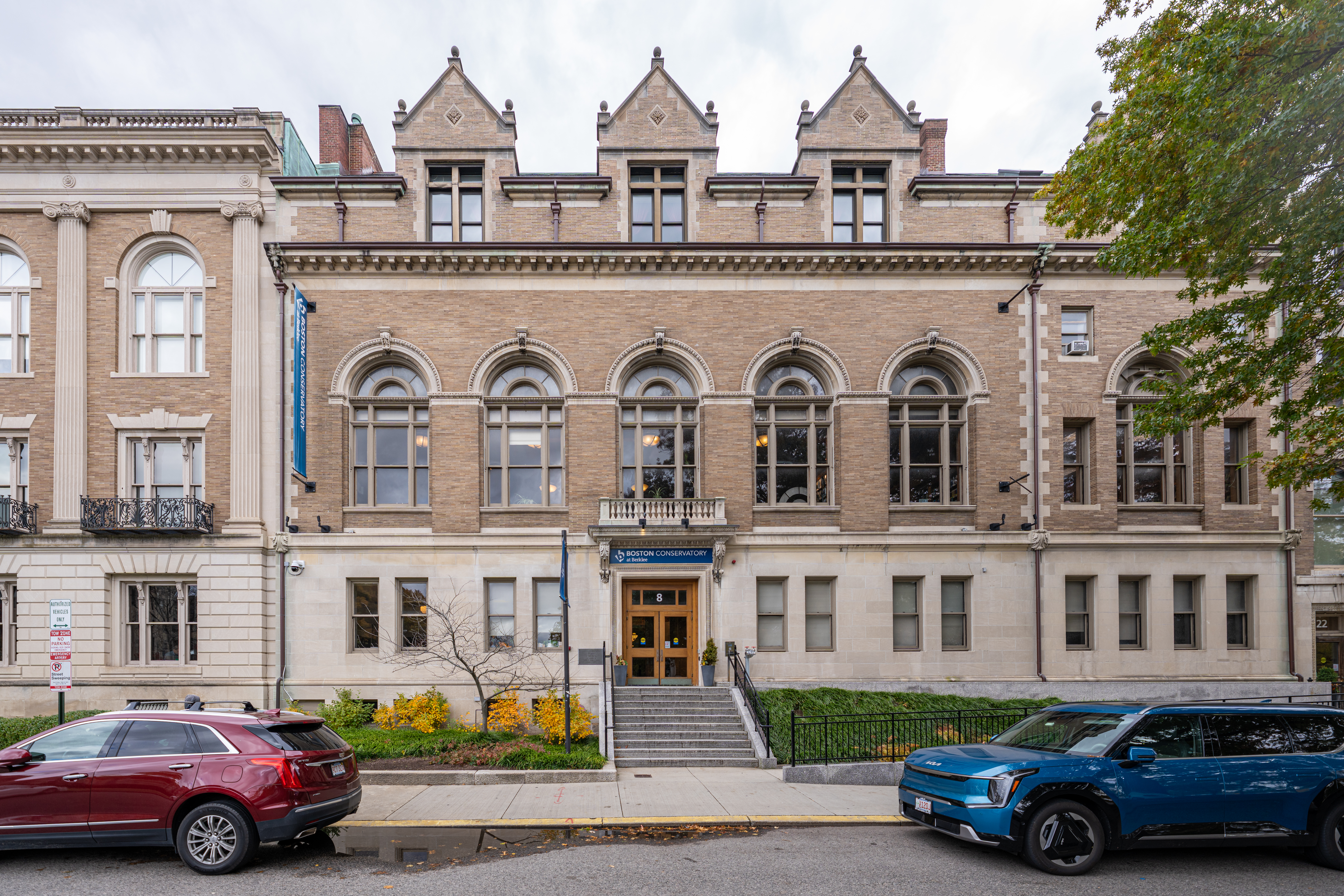
- 8 Fenway, the Conservatory's main building (2025)
- Type: Private performing arts conservatory
- Established: February 11, 1867
- Parent institution: Berklee
- President: Jim Lucchese; President of Berklee
- Executive Director: Michael Shinn, DMA; Executive Director of Boston Conservatory
- Students: Approximately 750
- Location: Boston, Massachusetts, U.S. 42.3462°N 71.0901°W
- Campus: Urban
- Website: bostonconservatory.berklee.edu

Boston Conservatory at Berklee (formerly The Boston Conservatory) is a private performing arts conservatory in Boston, Massachusetts. It grants undergraduate and graduate degrees in dance, music, and theater.

Boston Conservatory was founded on February 11, 1867, as a music conservatory and later expanded to include leading programs in dance, opera, and theater. It currently offers Bachelor of Fine Arts, Bachelor of Music, Master of Fine Arts, and Master of Music degrees, as well as Graduate Performance Diplomas, Artist Diplomas, and Professional Studies Certificates.

In 2016, Boston Conservatory merged with Berklee College of Music to form "Berklee," an umbrella institution that includes Berklee College of Music, Berklee Online, Berklee Valencia, and Berklee NYC. With this, the conservatory's name was changed to "Boston Conservatory at Berklee." Boston Conservatory remains a disparate school within Berklee, continuing to offer its signature conservatory programs. Berklee is accredited by the New England Commission of Higher Education (NECHE) and authorized by the Massachusetts Department of Higher Education.

== History ==
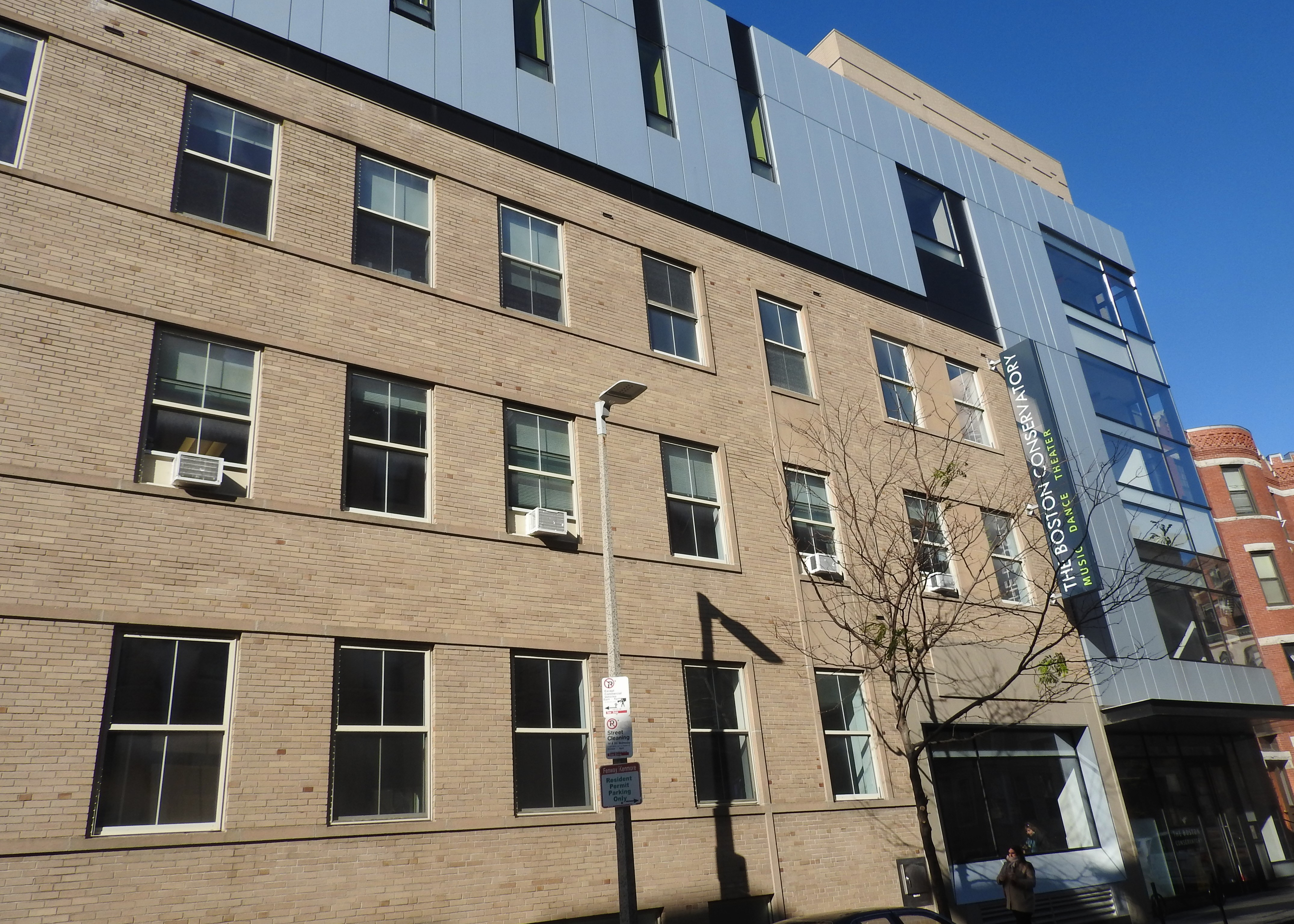
Boston Conservatory Dance Theater

On February 11, 1867, violinist and composer Julius Eichberg founded Boston Conservatory as a professional training academy and a community music school. It was one of the first conservatories to grant admission to African Americans and women.

In 1873, Eichberg's operetta The Doctor of Alcontara was performed at Boston Conservatory by the first African-American opera company in the U.S.

In 1878, Eichberg established the Eichberg String Quartet, the first professional female quartet.

In 1893, upon Eichberg's death, direction was assumed by R. Marriner Floyd, with Herman P. Chelius, organist and composer, serving as the musical director. Under their direction, the school was first incorporated in 1896.

After the turn of the 20th century, Boston Conservatory created the first "grand opera" department in the U.S.

In 1943, Jan Veen established Boston Conservatory's Dance Division, the first program to emphasize both classical ballet and America's emerging modern dance. In 1951, the school gained authority to award Bachelor of Fine Arts degrees in drama and dance.

Prior to 2016, Boston Conservatory was an independent private college with accredited programs in dance, music, and theater that presented more than 700 performances each year.

In 2015, Boston Conservatory began talks with Berklee College of Music to explore a merger of the two schools.

On June 1, 2016, the two schools merged under an institutional umbrella called Berklee, which now consists of Boston Conservatory at Berklee, Berklee College of Music, Berklee Online, Berklee Valencia, and Berklee NYC.

== Academics ==
Boston Conservatory awards the Bachelor of Fine Arts, Bachelor of Music, Master of Fine Arts, and Master of Music degrees, as well as Graduate Performance Diplomas, Artist Diplomas, and Professional Studies Certificates. It also offers training and education programs during the summer for dancers, musicians, and theater artists.

== Student life ==
Instead of dormitories, Boston Conservatory at Berklee uses Victorian brownstones for on-campus housing. Undergraduate rooms consist of quints, quads, triples, doubles, and singles.

Approximately 29% of students live on campus.

== See also ==
- Berklee College of Music
- Music schools in the United States
