= Brownstone (graphic novel) =

2024 graphic novel by Samuel Teer and Mar Julia

- Author: Samuel Teer
- Illustrator: Mar Julia
- Language: English
- Genre: Young adult fiction
- Publisher: HarperCollins
- Publication date: 2024
- Publication place: United States
- Media type: Print Hardcover
- ISBN: 9780358394754
- OCLC: 1135097732

Brownstone is a young adult graphic novel written by Samuel Teer and illustrated by Mar Julia. It was published by HarperCollins in 2024.

== Plot ==
When her mother goes abroad for work, fourteen-year-old Almudena is sent to stay with her estranged father, Xavier. Xavier, a Guatemalan immigrant with limited English, tries to involve her in the renovation of his historic brownstone, which he intends to rent out at affordable rates to combat rising gentrification. Feeling isolated due to the language barrier with her father, her unfamiliarity with Latin American culture, and judgements from locals who see her as an outsider because of her biracial background, Almudena initially resents Xavier and his neighborhood. As she learns more about the locals and they in turn get to know her, however, Almudena comes to better understand her father and becomes determined to finish the brownstone so her new friends are not forced out by rent hikes.

== Reception ==
The book was given starred reviews by Kirkus Reviews and Publishers Weekly.

Awards and honors
Year	Award/Honor	Result	Ref.
2025	Michael L. Printz Award	Won	
2025	American Library Association - Great Graphic Novels for Teens	Top Ten	
2024	Harvey Award for Best Young Adult Book	Nominated	
