= Brown Stone =

Affluent neighborhood in Beijing, China

- Neighborhood
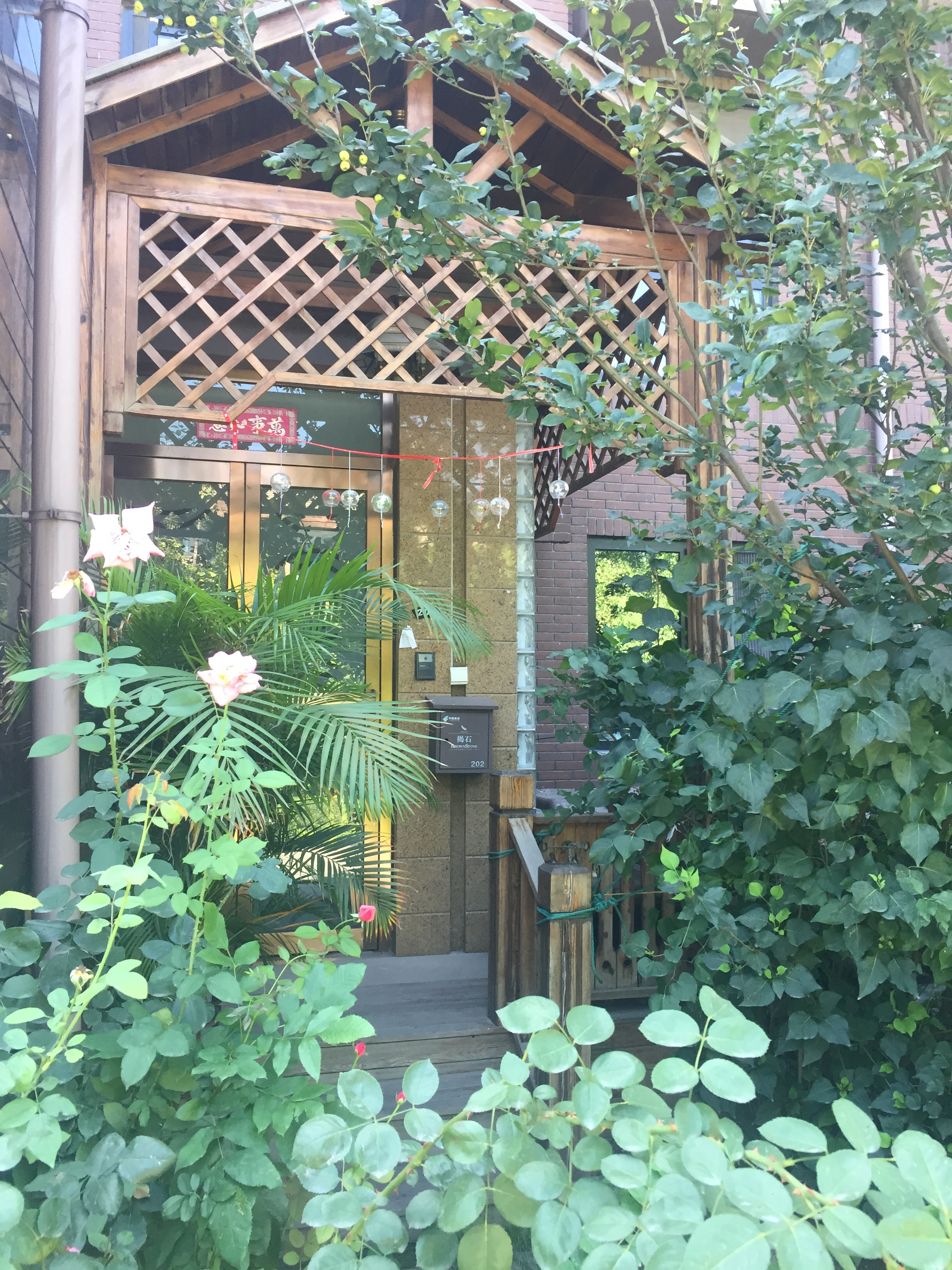
- The front of a townhouse in Brown Stone
- Interactive map of Brown Stone
- Coordinates: 40.013943°N 116.321512°E
- Country: China
- City: Beijing
- District: Haidian District
- Postal Code: 100084

Brown Stone (abbreviated BS, Chinese: 褐石園, pinyin: Hèshí Yuán) is an affluent neighborhood in Haidian District, Beijing, China, surrounded by the famous Tsinghua University and the Old Summer Palace. Originally developed by the Beijing Taiyue Real Estate Development Company (北京泰跃房地产开发有限责任公司) in 2005, it now run by its affiliated estate keeping company. The neighborhood was developed in two stages, with the first stage finished in 2008, while the second stage was not completed until 2010.

== Demographics ==
The precise population of Brown Stone is unknown, as there is no census conducted specifically to the neighborhood. But the population density is known to be significantly lower than the Beijing high average, as there are only 25 4-5 story townhouses in the huge 101900 m^{2} close neighborhood.

Among the residents are famous professors and scholars from nearby reputed Tsinghua University and Peking University, business executives, artists, architects, and designers.
