= Peabody Institute =

Performing arts conservatory of Johns Hopkins University

- Type: Private music school
- Established: 1857; 169 years ago
- Parent institution: Johns Hopkins University
- Dean: Fred Bronstein
- Undergraduates: 385 (Fall 2022)
- Location: Baltimore, Maryland, United States; 39.2973°N 76.615°W
- Campus: Urban
- Website: www.peabody.jhu.edu

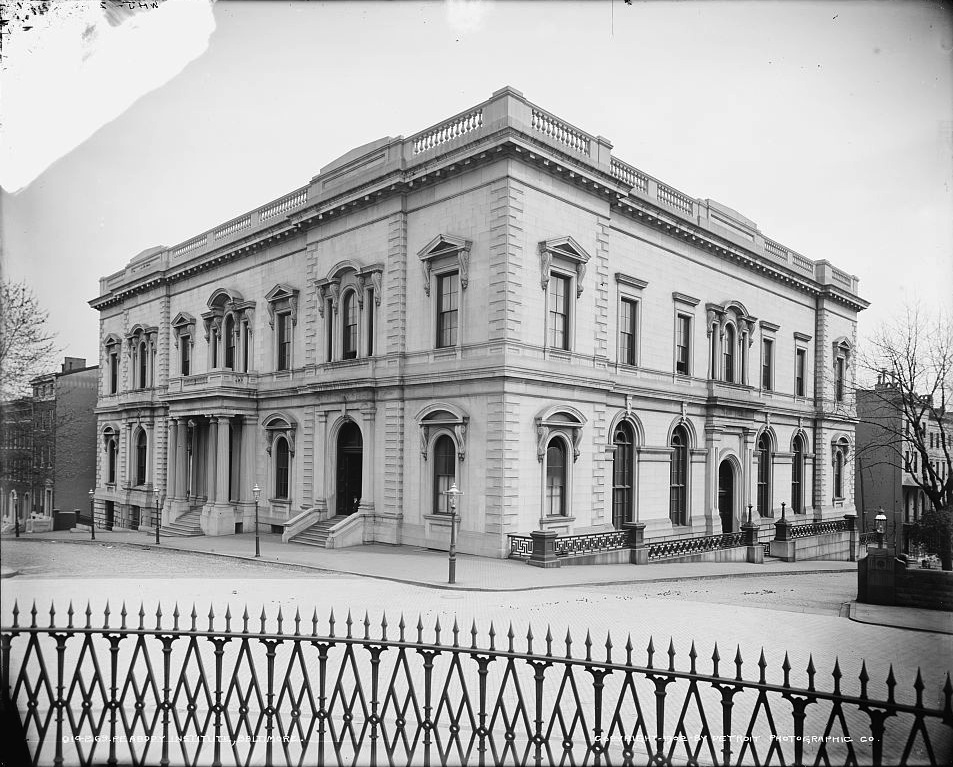
Peabody Institute, East Mount Vernon Place, c. 1902

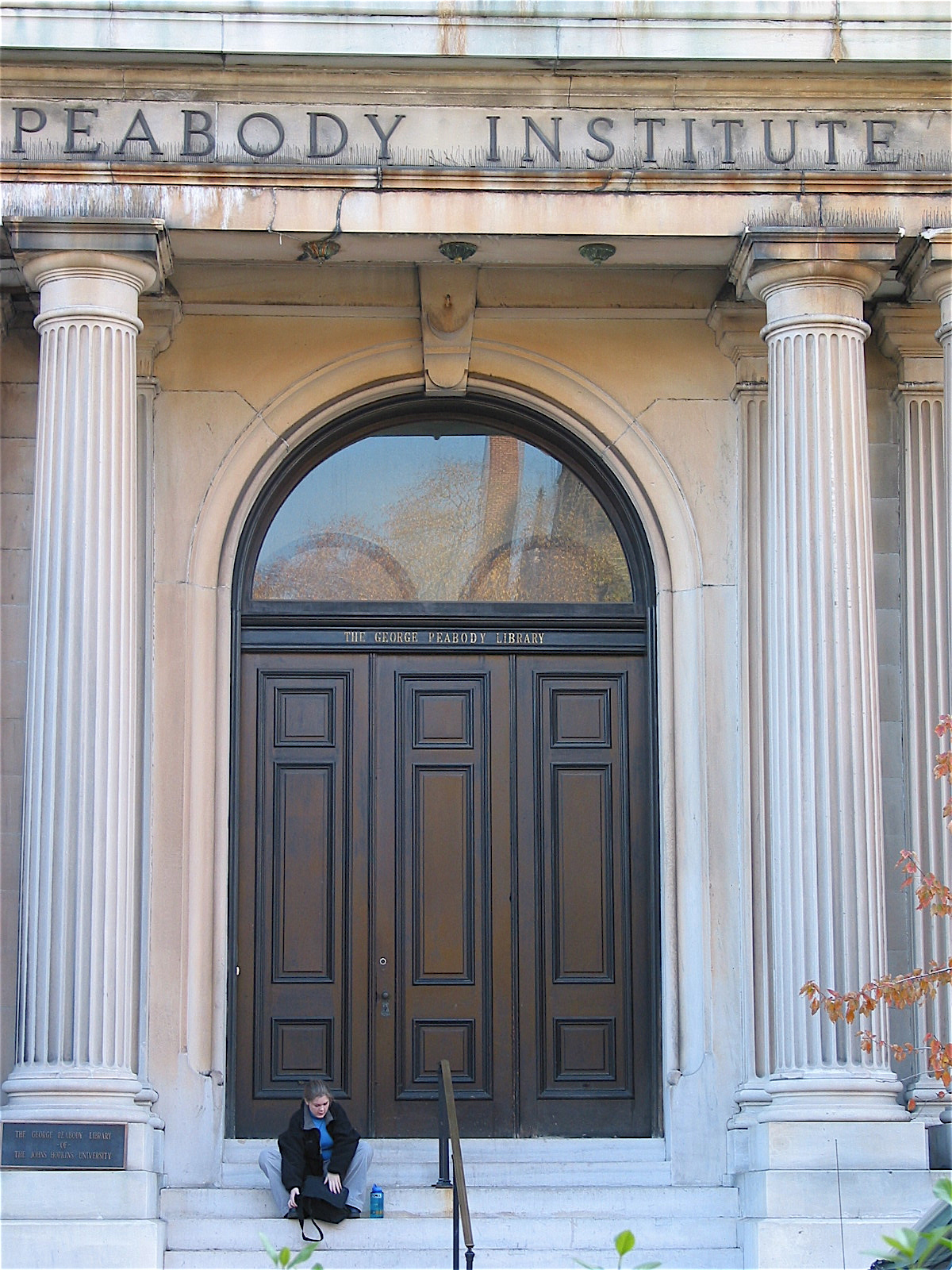
George Peabody Library (east wing) - built 1878

The Peabody Institute of the Johns Hopkins University is a private music and dance conservatory and preparatory school in Baltimore, Maryland. Founded in 1857, it became affiliated with Johns Hopkins in 1977.

== History ==
Philanthropist and merchant George Peabody (1795–1869) founded the institute in 1857 and opened it in 1866 with a bequest of about $800,000. This sum, from his personal fortune, was amassed initially in Massachusetts and later augmented in Baltimore (where he lived and worked from 1815 to 1835). It vastly increased through banking and finance during following residences in New York City and London, where he became the wealthiest American of his time.

Completion of the white marble Grecian-Italianate west wing, the original building housing the institute, designed by Edmund George Lind, was delayed by the Civil War. It was dedicated in 1866, with Peabody, having traveled across the North Atlantic Ocean, speaking at the ceremonies on the front steps in front of the Washington Monument circle before a large audience of notaries and citizens including hundreds of assembled pupils from the Baltimore City Public Schools. Under the direction of well-known musicians, composers, conductors, and Peabody alumni, the conservatory, concerts, lecture series, library and art gallery, along with the "Peabody Prizes" (an annual awarding of gold, silver and bronze medals with certificates and cash to top graduates of the city), attracted a considerable national attention to the Institute and the city's growing culture. Under strong academic leadership, the Peabody evolved into an internationally renowned cultural and literary center through the late 19th and the 20th centuries, especially after a major expansion in 1877–1878, with the completion of its eastern half housing the George Peabody Library with five stacked tiers of wrought iron balconies holding book stacks(shelves), surmounted by a beveled glass skylight, one of the most beautiful and distinctive libraries in the U.S.

The 1878 east wing on East Mount Vernon Place, containing the affiliated George Peabody Library, joined the other rows of townhouses, mansions, art gallery, clubs, hotels, and churches around the Washington Monument which developed into the Mount Vernon neighborhood on the former estate of Revolutionary War commander John Eager Howard. The institute grew from a local academy, with an art and sculpture gallery, public lecture series, and the extensive reference library which, although non-circulating, predated the first public library system in America. The library was created and endowed in 1882 by Peabody's friend Enoch Pratt. In turn, both Peabody and Pratt inspired the expansive philanthropic efforts of Scottish-American steel tycoon Andrew Carnegie.

In 1955, Peabody inaugurated a sacred music department led by Arthur Howes, which is now defunct.
Its electronic music department, founded by composer Jean Eichelberger Ivey in 1967, was the first in any American conservatory, and remains the home of two historic Moog modular synthesizers from its first decade in operation.

In 1978, Peabody began working with Baltimore's Johns Hopkins University under an affiliation agreement.
In 1985, the institute officially became a constituent school of Johns Hopkins.

Peabody is one of 156 schools in the United States that offers a Doctorate of Musical Arts degree. It houses two libraries: the historical George Peabody Library (originally the Peabody Institute Library) established when the Institute opened in 1866, renowned for its collection of 19th-century and other rare books; and an additional music reference academic library, the Arthur Friedheim Library (named for the Russian-born pianist/ conductor), that includes more than 100,000 books, scores, and recordings.

The conservatory was later supplemented by a preparatory school and auditorium. "Peabody Prizes" are awarded to top high school graduates beginning the following year at commencement exercises and continued for 122 years as an annual tradition with public announcements to city media.

Additional structures along East Centre Street and Saint Paul Street, including a parking garage and two dormitory towers, were constructed in 1971. During the early 1990s, several remaining townhouses on East Mount Vernon Place to the east intersection with St. Paul were acquired and rebuilt, along with other townhouses with distinctive iron scrollwork balconies facing North Charles Street to the south. This enabled The Peabody to round out its tight campus of attached buildings to the entire city block bounded by Charles (Washington Place), Monument (Mount Vernon Place), St. Paul, and Centre Streets.

The Peabody campus is included in the Mount Vernon Place Historic District, which was listed on the National Register of Historic Places and designated a National Historic Landmark District in 1971. The main building on Mount Vernon Place, built during 1857-1878, was designated a Baltimore City Landmark on October 14, 1975.

== Preparatory ==
Peabody Preparatory offers instruction and enrichment programs for school-age children across various sites in Baltimore and its surrounding counties: "Downtown" (Baltimore, main campus), Towson, Annapolis (Maryland Hall for the Creative Arts) and Howard County (in cooperation with three schools).

== Notable alumni ==
- Tori Amos, singer, songwriter, pianist; the youngest student ever admitted to the institute.
- Dominick Argento, composer
- James Atherton, tenor
- Audrey Babcock, mezzo-soprano
- Zuill Bailey, cellist
- Manuel Barrueco, guitarist
- Catherine Drinker Bowen, biographer
- Carter Brey, cellist
- Frances R. Brown, college president
- Petrit Çeku, guitarist
- Angelin Chang, pianist
- George Colligan, pianist/trumpeter/drummer/composer
- Tony Conrad, violinist and composer
- Charles Covington, pianist
- Viet Cuong, composer
- Gemze de Lappe, dancer
- Charity Sunshine Tillemann-Dick, operatic soprano
- Ruth Wales du Pont, socialite, philanthropist, and classical composer
- Amber Estenson, social media influencer and opera singer
- Joshua Fineberg, composer
- Virgil Fox, organist
- James Allen Gähres, conductor (music)
- Philip Glass, composer
- Hilary Hahn, violinist
- Michael Hedges, guitarist
- Michael Hersch, composer
- Margarita Höhenrieder, pianist
- Camara Kambon, composer and pianist
- Kim Kashkashian, violist
- Fred Karpoff, pianist and artist-teacher
- Kevin Kenner, pianist
- Maxim Kozlov, cellist and educator
- Custer LaRue, soprano
- O'Donel Levy, guitarist
- Richard Leibert, organist
- Colin McPhee, composer and ethnomusicologist
- David Meece, pianist, singer, songwriter
- Su Meng, guitarist
- Sylvia Meyer, harpist; the first female member of the National Symphony Orchestra
- Thomas F. McNulty, a president of the WWIN-FM Baltimore and a member of the Maryland House of Delegates from 1942 to 1946
- Jessye Norman, operatic soprano
- Piotr Pakhomkin, guitarist
- Phillip L. Pearl, physicist and conservatory-trained percussionist
- Rebecca Pitcher, actress; primarily known for playing Christine in the Broadway adaption of The Phantom of the Opera
- Awadagin Pratt, pianist
- Lance Reddick, actor, musician
- Ilyich Rivas, conductor (music)
- Jake Runestad, composer
- Lillian Smith, author of Strange Fruit
- Ana Vidović, guitarist
- André Watts, pianist
- Hugh Wolff, conductor and director of orchestras at the New England Conservatory of Music.
- Eliza Woods, composer and pianist
- Marie Kunkel Zimmerman, soprano
- Igor Zubkovsky, cellist

== Notable faculty ==
- Diran Alexanian, cello
- Manuel Barrueco, guitar
- Oscar Bettison, composition
- George Frederick Boyle, piano
- Garnett Bruce, opera
- Elliott Carter (1946–48), composition
- Thomas Dolby, Music for New Media
- Du Yun, composition
- David Fedderly, tuba
- Lupe Fiasco, hip-hop
- Leon Fleisher, piano
- Virgil Fox, organist
- Elizabeth Futral, voice
- Denyce Graves, voice
- Richard Franko Goldman, Director (1968–1977), President (1969–1977)
- Asger Hamerik, Director (1871–1898)
- Michael Hersch, composition
- Ernest Hutcheson, piano
- Sean Jones, jazz
- Richard Johnson, jazz
- Jean Eichelberger Ivey, composition, electronic music
- Katharine Lucke (1875-1962) - organ, composition
- Nicholas Maw (1935–2009), composition
- Anthony McGill, clarinet
- Gustav Meier, conducting
- Edward Palanker, clarinet
- Amit Peled, cello
- Marina Piccinini, flute
- Joel Puckett, theory and composition
- Kevin Puts, composition
- Hollis Robbins, humanities
- Martin Schmidt, computer music
- Berl Senofsky, violin
- John Shirley-Quirk, voice
- Robert van Sice, percussion
- Barry Tuckwell, horn
- Frank Valentino, voice
- John Walker, organ
- Warren Wolf, jazz
- Eliza Woods, piano
- Chen Yi, composition (1996-1998)

== In popular culture ==
In the 1980 novel Jacob Have I Loved by Katherine Paterson, the character Caroline Bradshaw attends a summer program at Peabody in order to further her training as a singer.

== See also ==
- Music school
- Music schools in the United States
