= Borenstein =

Borenstein is a surname and may refer to:

- Benjamin A. Borenstein (1928–2006), American food scientist
- Eliot Borenstein, American professor of Russian and Slavic Studies
- Johann Borenstein, Israeli roboticist
- Joyce Borenstein (born 1950), Canadian director and animator
- Larry Borenstein (1919–1981), American property owner and art dealer
- Max Borenstein (born 1981), American film writer and director
- Nimrod Borenstein (born 1969), British-French-Israeli composer
- Nathaniel Borenstein (born 1957), American computer scientist
- Sam Borenstein (1908–1969), Canadian painter
- Zach Borenstein (born 1990), American baseball player

== See also ==
- Borensztein
- Borenshtein
