= USS Bronstein =

Two ships of the United States Navy have been named USS Bronstein in honor of Ben Richard Bronstein, Assistant Surgeon, who was killed in action on 28 February 1942.

- USS Bronstein (DE-189), was a destroyer escort commissioned on 13 December 1943.
- USS Bronstein (FF-1037), was a frigate commissioned on 16 June 1963.

== See also ==
- Bronstein-class frigate
