= Kenneth Bronstein =

Kenneth Bronstein (died October 18, 2024) was an American atheist activist. He was the founder of NYC Atheists, a group founded to support the separation of church and state.
