= Ilia Braunstein =

Belgian philatelist

Ing Ilia Braunstein (23 June 1908 – 6 November 1980) was a Belgian philatelist who was added to the Roll of Distinguished Philatelists in 1973. He was born in Chișinău, and went to the University in Gent, Belgium to study engineering AIG.

He was a member of the Academic de Philatelic de Belgique and was Commissioner General for Belgica 72 for which duty he was awarded with the insignia of an Officier de I'Ordre de Leopold II.

Ilia was the creator and owner of a disc firm named Discotrade in Schaerbeek, Brussels, Belgium.
