= Hendrik Bulthuis =

Dutch writer, linguist, and Esperantist

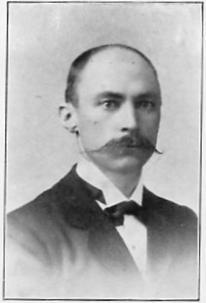
Hendrik Bulthuis.

Hendrik Jan Bulthuis (15 September 1865, in Warffum – 27 April 1945, in Noordbroek) was a Dutch customs official, author, and translator of more than thirty works into Esperanto. One of his novels, Idoj de Orfeo (Children of Orpheus) is listed in William Auld's Basic Esperanto Reading List.

== Life and career ==
Born in the province of Groningen in northeast Netherlands, Bulthuis was a customs officer by profession from 1889 until 1924. In his youth he was a Volapükist. In 1899 he received a diploma in Volapük as a master teacher (Esperanto: ĉefinstruisto). His third son, Rico Bulthuis (The Hague 1911 - 2009) became a respected author who said of his father: "He spoke nine languages, but in none of these languages ever had a conversation with me".

=== Esperanto activity ===
In 1901 D. Uitterdijk sent him a textbook of Esperanto, after which he became an Esperantist. He engaged in much correspondence with Esperantists of other countries, did much Esperanto publicity, especially in The Hague, taught courses, and served as the secretary of the examinations committee from its establishment until the present. From 1910 on L. K. In latter years he worked only for Esperanto; as a novelist (of works originally in Esperanto), a translator and author of small booklets, Bulthuis has been one of the most enduring workers in Esperanto.

=== Literary activity ===
Starting in 1907, when his translation from French of Two Tickets (Du Biletoj) by Florian appeared, he published 35 books and brochures. Never is Better than Late, a comedy translated from English, seemingly his first printed work, appeared in the lit. appendix of L. I. (International Language) in 1905. He became known mainly for a trio of original works. The Children of Orpheus, 1923, despite some implausibilities, marked its author as a clear stylist and a person of outstanding storytelling talent. It still remains perhaps the most popular of his magnum opi. That was followed by the naively simple Joseph and Potifer's Wife, 1926, and The Fuzzy Hand, 1928, an intimately aware picture of Dutch peasant life, in which Bulthuis's inclination for non-veresimilitude is still evident.

Next in importance are his grandiose translations: Hendrik Conscience's classic The Lion of Flanders (1929) from the Dutch; the thematically heavy but well translated Emperor and Galilean, 1930, from the Norwegian of Ibsen. Both of these works were crowned by the Academy. Jane Eyre, 1930, from the English of Ch. Bronte survived a careless translation well enough to remain an interesting story, thanks to its essential value. There also appeared in 1926 Little Johannes (La Malgranda Johano) from the Dutch of van Eeden. As a poet Bulthuis published only The Two Ships (La Du Sxipoj), 1909, for which he received a prize from Barcelona. For the Theatre in 1908 he wrote the praised (?) Uncle from America (Onklo el Ameriko), 1922; a drama Poor in Spirit (Malricxa en Spirito) and, from the German, translated Salome, 1910, a drama by the Englishman, Wilde.

Worth mentioning from his other works are: the translations Diary of a Village Clerk, 1921, and Josepha, 1922, both from the Danish by Blicher; and in 1921 Character, from the Dutch by Luiscius (that work has also appeared in Finnish, Czech, Italian, Catalan, all translated from the Esperanto text.) His nine school readers, mostly for little Dutch children, and his retelling for youth of Robinson Crusoe, were conscientiously done.

Later Bulthuis is translated Don Quixote from Spanish and wrote another youth novel. The most extensive commentary on Bulthuis's works is by Nekrasov, who wrote extensive critiques of both his original novels from a Marxist viewpoint for the ante-schism "La Nova epoko" (The New Epoch) (Oct. 1929-Feb. 1930) and for the post-schism "La Nova Etapo" (The New Stage) (1932). That was too tendentiously Marxist to encounter general agreement. Bulthuis's language style is simple, classical, without ornamentation. One can hardly find in it attempts at "impressionistic" experiment. He is more correctly called a weaver of stories, than a conscious "evolver" of our language. R. Banham.

== Works ==
=== Original ===
His original novels (in Esperanto) were:

- Idoj de Orfeo (Offspring of Orpheus) (1923)
- Jozefo kaj la edzino de Potifar (Joseph and Potifer's Wife) (1926)
- La Vila Mano (The Fuzzy Hand) (1928)
- Inferio (Land of Hell) (1938)

His original plays (in Esperanto):

- Malriĉa en spirito (Poor in Spirit)
- La Onklino el Ameriko (The Aunt from America) (1922)

A collection of poems:

- La Du ŝipoj (The Two Ships) (1909)

=== Translated into Esperanto from various languages ===
Of his many translations (into Esperanto) worth citing are:

- Les Deux Billets (eo:Du biletoj(1907)) by Florian. Translated from French.
- Never Better than Late A comedy play translated from English.
- Salome (1910) by Wilde. Translated from a version in German.
- Character (eo:Karaktero (1921)) by Luiscius. From Dutch.
- The Rector of Veilbye (eo:Taglibro de vilaĝ-pedelo (1921)) by Blicher, From Danish.
- Josepha (1922) by Blicher. From Danish.
- Little Johannes (eo:La Malgranda Johano (1926)), a very popular work in Dutch literature by Frederik van Eeden. Translated from Dutch.
- The Lion of Flanders (eo:La Leono de Flandrujo (1929)) by Hendrik Conscience. Translated from Flemish.
- Jane Eyre (1930) by Charlotte Brontë. From English.
- Emperor and Galilean (eo:Imperiestro kaj Galileano (1930)) by Ibsen. From Norwegen.

== Sources ==
First version of this article was translated from the Esperanto Vikipedio. That article quotes extensively from the Enciklopedio de Esperanto.
