= Fred Bronstein =

American pianist, music educator, and academic administrator

- Born: United States
- Occupations: Pianist, music educator, academic administrator

Fred Bronstein is an American pianist, music educator, and academic administrator. He has served as dean of the Peabody Institute since 2014. He was previously the president of the St. Louis Symphony Orchestra, Omaha Symphony Orchestra, and the Dallas Symphony Orchestra.

Fred Bronstein graduated from Boston University with a Bachelor of Music and earned a Master of Music degree at the Manhattan School of Music. He received his Doctor of Musical Arts degree from the State University of New York, Stony Brook. He received the Alumni Award for Distinguished Service from Boston University's College of Fine Arts in 2005. In 2015, he was the distinguished alumni guest speaker at the State University of Stony Brook commencement. Bronstein was also selected by the Baltimore Daily Record as an Icon Honoree in 2022.

A classically trained pianist, Bronstein toured for eight years and recorded for New World Records as a pianist with the chamber group Aequalis, which he co-founded.

During Bronstein's tenure as Dean, Peabody has launched new undergraduate degree programs in Music for New Media and Dance, both graduating their inaugural classes in 2022. The school will be offering a Bachelor of Music degree in Hip Hop starting in fall 2025.

Bronstein has spoken and written about the need to change the culture of the performing arts and performing arts training to focus on career development, increase diversity, and adapt to new technologies.
