= Bronston =

Bronston is a surname. Notable people with the surname include:

- Douglas Bronston (1887–1951), American screenwriter and writer
- Jack E. Bronston (1922–2017), American lawyer and politician
- Samuel Bronston (1908–1994), Bessarabian-born American film producer and director
- William Bronston (born 1939), American physician and activist

== See also ==
- Bronson (disambiguation)
