= Mikhail Bronshtein =

Russian poet and Esperantist (born 1949)

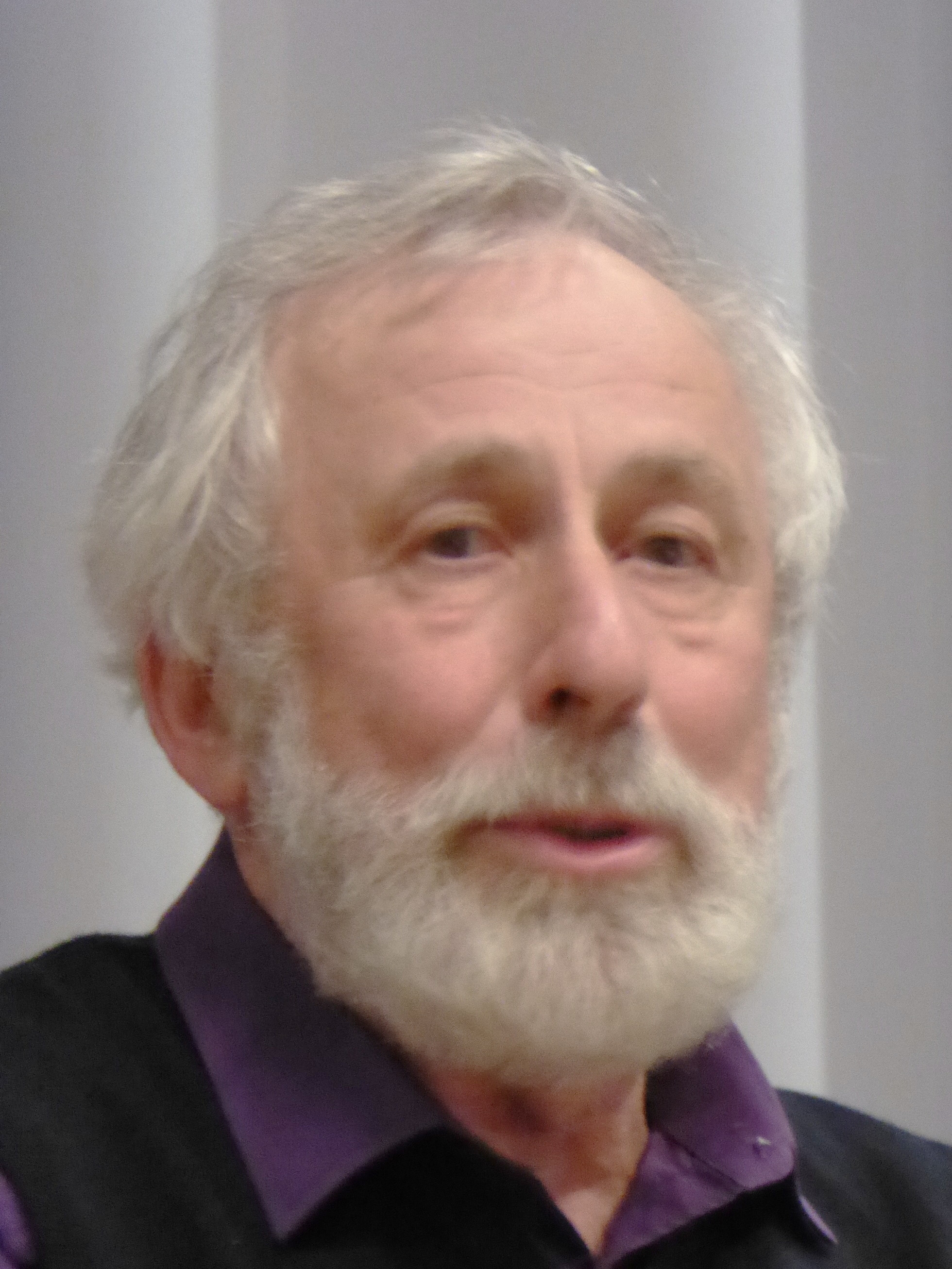
Mikaelo Bronŝtejn, 2016

Mikhail Bronshtein (Russian: Бронштейн, Михаил Цалевич, Esperanto: Mikaelo Bronŝtejn; born 1949), is a Soviet and Russian Esperantist, writer, engineer, singer-songwriter. He also uses the pen name Bruna Ŝtono. He authored a large number of books of prose and poetry in Esperanto.

== Books ==
- 1992, 1998, 2006: eo:Legendoj pri SEJM / Legends of SEJM
  a collection of short memories about the Soviet Esperantist Youth Movement
- 2004: eo:Dek tagoj de kapitano Postnikov (Ten Days of Captain Postnikov)
  About Александр Алексеевич Постников, a Russian officer and one of the founders of the Esperanto movement in the Russian Empire
  In 2007 it was translated into Russian as Десять дней капитана Постникова
- 2016: I Harnessed the Stars to Dream (eo:Mi stelojn jungis al revado)
  A historical novel covering the period of 1918–1938, devoted to the fate of Soviet Esperantists, including the Stalinist repressions.

== Awards ==
- 2003: Antoni Grabowski Award
- 2013: OSIEK-premio for the historical novel Dek tagoj de kapitano Postnikov (Ten Days of Captain Postnikov)
- 2021: Laurel of the Academy of Esperanto for Mi steljon jungis al revado
