= Interhelpo =

Cooperative of workers and farmers in Soviet Kyrgyzstan

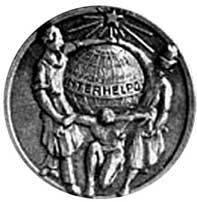
Interhelpo logo

Interhelpo (international laboristal helpo) was an industrial cooperative of workers and farmers (Esperantists and Idists) between 1923 and 1943, established for the special purpose of helping to build up socialism in Soviet Kyrgyzstan. The legal framework for the migration of working forces from the West to the Soviet Union was established through a resolution on "Proletarian help for Soviet Russia" (proletarskaya pomoshch' sovetskoy Rossii) adopted by the Fourth World Congress of the Communist International (1922).

On May 1, 1923, Interhelpo — an acronym of the Ido compound international laboristal helpo — was founded in Žilina, Czechoslovakia (now Slovakia) on the initiative of the Czechoslovak Bolshevik Rudolf Pavlovič Mareček, who had actively participated in fights against Basmachis in Semirechye and was editor of the newspaper Zarya Svobody ('The Dawn of Freedom') in neighboring Verniy. Other Czechoslovak agricultural cooperatives founded with the aim of building socialism in the USSR were the Kladno Commune (Armavir, Krasnodar Krai), the Slovak Commune (Stalingrad Guberniya), Reflector (Ershovsk, Saratov Oblast), Pflug ('plow'), Solidarita, and Čechocentr.

From 1925 onwards, trains from the railway station in Žilina transported 1078 people (including mainly Czechs and Slovaks, but also Hungarians, Ruthenians and other nationalities, and including both direct members and their families) to Kyrgyzstan.

== Activities in Kyrgyzstan ==
Its members made many products on the 'green meadow'. The Slovak politician Alexander Dubček also participated in this cooperative in his youth.

The cooperative's most notable projects include:

- in 1925: an electric power station
- in 1927: a textile factory
- in 1928: a melting-house
- a furniture factory
- railroads, hospitals, main government building in the capital of Kyrgyzstan
- a club house and cultural venue (klub pařížských komundartů)

In 1925, the Interhelpo was declared the best cooperative in the Soviet Union. At one point, it produced 20 percent of Kyrgyzstan's industrial products.

In 1927, members of the cooperative formed a theatre group, which performed plays under the supervision of the theatre director Eduard Peringer in the carpenter’s workshop in Czech, Slovak, Hungarian and other languages.

In 1930, the Czechoslovak journalist Julius Fučík visited the cooperative.

By 1932, the cooperative comprised members of different backgrounds of whom many were recruited from within Soviet Kyrgyzstan: 223 Russians, 92 Czechs, 66 Ukrainians, 43 Slovaks, 37 Kyrgyz, 26 Germans, 22 Hungarians, 3 Uyghurs (Kasghar), 2 Uzbeks, 2 Mordovians, 2 Tatars, 1 Jew, 1 Armenian, and 1 Rusyn.

In 1943, during the Second World War, the property of the Interhelpo cooperative was transferred into the hands of the state.

== Legacy ==
Today the cooperative's residential buildings on Intergel'po Street (former site of the cooperative) are in a desolate state and are inhabited mostly by marginalized segments of society (such as e.g. internal working migrants from Southern Kyrgyzstan):

"In the accounts of most residents, the builders of the districts where either unknown, or misrepresented as “Czech prisoners of war” or “Czech war refugees,” who had ended up in Central Asia in the aftermath of World War II. Today, almost a hundred years later, little reminds today’s residents of the achievements of the cooperative. Only Nazdar, a small Czechoslovak association, tries to preserve its historical heritage with financially limited funds."

In 2008, Czech Television released the documentary Interhelpo. Historie jedné iluze (“Interhelpo – The History of an Illusion”) which portrays the historical experience of the cooperative largely in negative terms, highlighting human losses and the ultimate failure of the cooperative.

== See also ==
- Neutral Moresnet
