= Brownstone (surname) =

Brownstone is a surname. Notable people with the surname include:

- Cecily Brownstone (1909–2005), American food writer
- Doreen Brownstone (1922–2022), Canadian actress
- Harvey Brownstone (born 1956), Canadian judge, author, and television host
- Meyer Brownstone (1922–2019), Canadian activist, civil servant, and academic
