= Ernest Drezen =

Soviet Esperantist (1892–1937)

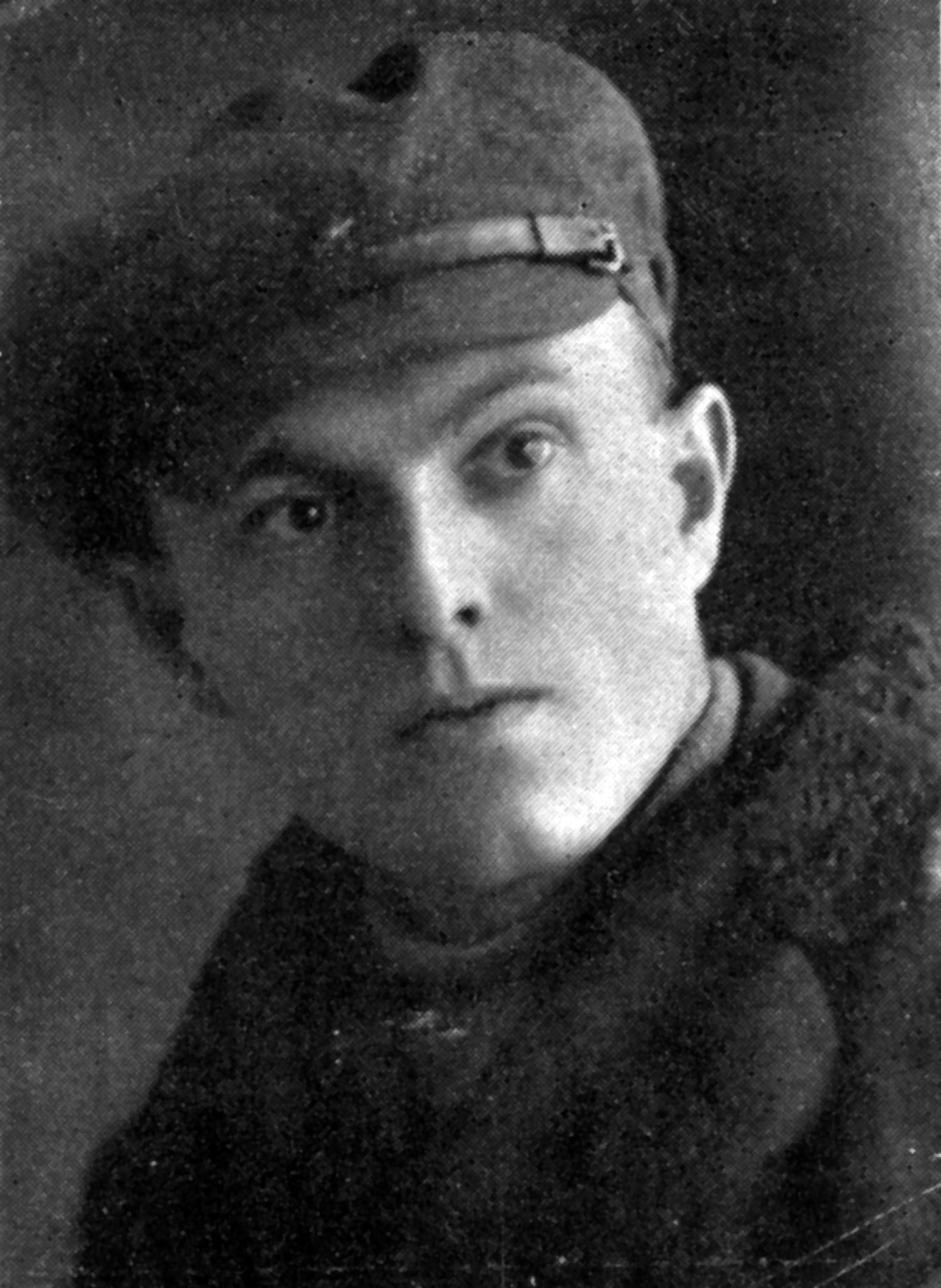
- Ernest Drezen in 1928
- Born: Ernests-Vilhelms Drezinjŝ; November 14, 1892; Liepāja, Latvia, Russian Empire
- Died: October 27, 1937 (aged 45); Moscow, Soviet Union
- Education: Peter the Great St. Petersburg Polytechnic University
- Organization: Soviet Esperantist Union
- Political party: Communist
- Spouse: Elena Sazonova

Ernest Karlovich Drezen (14 November 1892 – 27 October 1937) was a Soviet Esperantist (i.e. a proponent of the artificial international language Esperanto) and engineer. He was the leader of the Soviet Esperantist Union (SEU). Drezen was arrested and killed during the Great Purge in the 1930s.

== Biography ==
Drezen was born in Latvia in 1892 to a sailor's family. He attended secondary school in Kronstadt before attending the Peter the Great St. Petersburg Polytechnic University. During his time in university, Drezen was active in the student Esperantist group. He attended a military engineering school during World War I and became an officer in a Tsarist battalion responsible for electrical engineering. Drezen participated in the February Revolution and joined the Socialist Revolutionary Party, followed by the Communist Party, and began service in the Red Army. He then went to work in the Soviet government as the "deputy chargé d’affaires in the Central Executive Committee of Soviets". Drezen attended the Third All-Russian Esperantist Congress in 1921, during which the Soviet Esperantist Union was founded. He was responsible for outlining the principles of the organization, and he was elected its president. Drezen was also a member of the Sennacieca Asocio Tutmonda, though he was critical of their methods and ultimately expelled as part of the opposition in 1931.

Drezen shifted his focus from Marxism almost entirely to Esperanto following a loosening of ideological standards in the early 1930s. His work at this time focused primarily on standardization of scientific and technical terms in the language. Drezen was relieved from his position as president of the SEU in 1936. He was arrested along with other members of the SEU on 17 April 1937 as part of the Great Purge and was executed by gunshot on 27 October 1937. Drezen's reputation was rehabilitated by the Soviet Union in 1957, and he was posthumously readmitted to the Communist Party in 1989.

== Beliefs ==
Drezen described the appeal of Esperanto as "a certain relief from the grey monotony of social life in the Tsarist dictatorship". Following the creation of the Soviet Union, Drezen was an active member of the Communist Party. He opposed the inclusion of anarchists and social democrats in the Esperantist community, and he was critical of the Sennacieca Asocio Tutmonda for being insufficiently Communist. Drezen advocated an internationalist approach and encouraged members of the Soviet Esperantist community to reach out to Esperantist socialists in other countries. He believed that Esperanto's status of an international language among the workers must be established before a worldwide socialist movement could be undertaken.

== Works ==
- La Vojoj de Formiĝo kaj Disvastiĝo de la Lingvo Internacia (1929)
- Zamenhof (1929)
- Historio de la Mondolingvo (1931)
- Analiza Historio de Esperanto-Movado (1931)
- Skizoj pri Teorio de Esperanto (1931)

== See also ==
- Esperanto in the Soviet Union

== Bibliography ==
- Lins, Ulrich (2016). Dangerous Language — Esperanto Under Hitler and Stalin. Palgrave Macmillan. ISBN 9781349715053.
- Lins, Ulrich (2017). Dangerous Language — Esperanto and the Decline of Stalinism. Palgrave Macmillan. ISBN 9781352000207.
