= RealSense =

American computer vision and robotics technology company

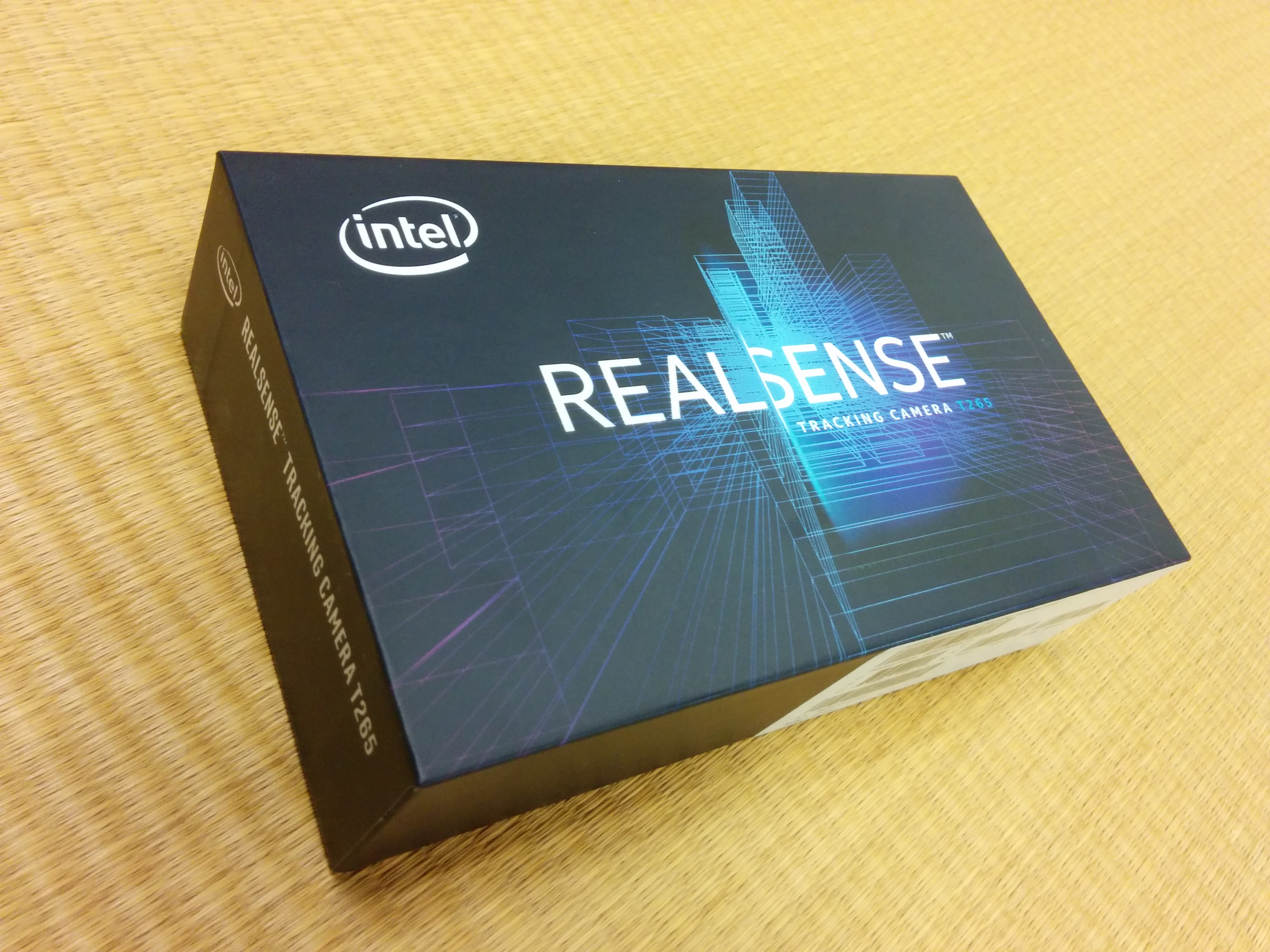
- Type: Subsidiary
- Industry: Computer vision, Robotics
- Headquarters: Cupertino, California, U.S.
- Parent: Cognex Corporation
- Website: realsenseai.com

RealSense is an American technology company that specializes in computer vision hardware and software as well as depth cameras. The company was first launched as an internal research project by Intel Corporation. In July 2025, it was spun off as a separate corporate entity. Cognex Corporation, a machine vision manufacturer, announced in September 2026 that it had reached an agreement to acquire the company.

== History ==
In order to develop 3D cameras and computer vision technologies, Intel Corporation launched RealSense as an internal research project in 2014. The technology was developed over the course of the following ten years to enable depth perception capabilities in both industrial and consumer applications.

On July 11, 2025, Intel formally completed the spinout of the division into a separate corporate entity called RealSense, Inc. as part of a larger corporate restructuring process headed by former Intel CEO Pat Gelsinger. A $50 million Series A funding round headed by a private equity firm with a focus on semiconductors, in addition to strategic investments from the MediaTek Innovation Fund and Intel Capital funded the changeover. Former Intel executive Nadav Orbach was named CEO. After its independence, the company expanded its operations and partnered with Nvidia to integrate hardware with platforms such as Nvidia Jetson Thor.

On September 22, 2026, RealSense was officially acquired by machine vision manufacturer Cognex Corporation for about $500 million in cash, making the company into a specialized robotic perception division within Cognex. The facial authentication division of RealSense was not included in the acquisition and was planned to become its own independent biometrics company.

== Technology and Products ==
Stereoscopic imaging is the main method used by RealSense hardware to capture 3D depth data. The cameras use an on-board application-specific integrated circuit (ASIC) to calculate geometric distance while combining two imaging sensors to capture a scene from different angles. This technology is used by autonomous mobile robots (AMRs), quadrupeds, humanoid robots, and fixed-arm perception-guided industrial robotics.

The main product categories consist of:

- D400 Series: The D415 and D435 depth models are part of this line, which was introduced in 2018. An embedded vision processing unit manages all of the real-time processing needed to create depth maps on-board, reducing host system processing overhead.
- RealSense ID: Access-control hardware and biometrics are the focus of the RealSense ID product line. It performs secure facial authentication directly on embedded endpoints by combining a local neural network pipeline with active depth sensors.

== Software and SDK ==
A cross-platform, open-source software stack called the RealSense SDK (formerly housed as the librealsense repository on GitHub) is used to integrate RealSense hardware. Device drivers, depth post-processing filters, calibration tools, and native runtime bindings for C++, Python, and C# are included in the SDK. It also provides official software integrations for the Robot Operating System (ROS 2) environment.

== See also ==
- Intel RealSense
- Kinect
- OpenCV
- Computer vision
- Humanoid robot
