= Eurythmics discography =

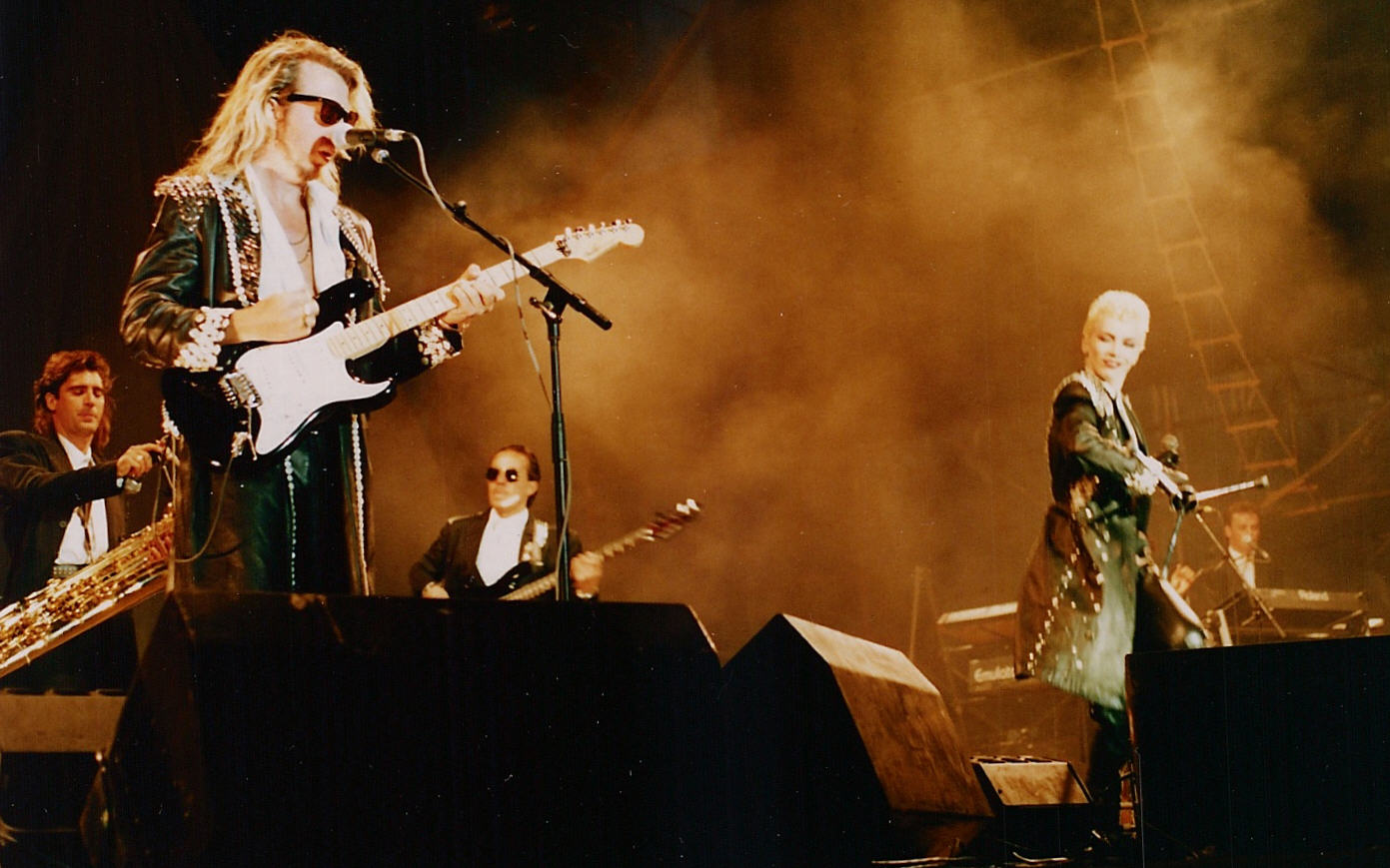
- Eurythmics performing in 1987
- Studio albums: 8
- Extended plays: 1
- Soundtrack albums: 1
- Live albums: 1
- Compilation albums: 2
- Singles: 35
- Promotional singles: 1
- Video albums: 8
- Music videos: 37

The discography of Eurythmics, a British rock/pop duo, consists of 8 studio albums, 1 extended play (EP), 1 soundtrack album, 1 live album, 2 compilation albums, 35 singles, 1 promotional single, 8 video albums, and 37 music videos. Their first studio album, In the Garden, was released in 1981 but they did not gain any commercial success until their second album, Sweet Dreams (Are Made of This), released in 1983. The album reached number three in the UK and was certified platinum. The album's title track was released as a single, and reached number 2 in the UK and number 1 in the United States and Canada. Later in 1983, the duo released their third album, Touch. It topped the UK album chart, and produced three UK top-10 singles; "Who's That Girl?", "Right by Your Side", and "Here Comes the Rain Again".

In 1984, Eurythmics released the soundtrack album 1984 (For the Love of Big Brother), which included the UK and Australian top-5 hit "Sexcrime (Nineteen Eighty-Four)". Their next studio album, 1985's Be Yourself Tonight, peaked at number 3 in the UK, spent 4 weeks at number 1 in Australia, and went double platinum in both the UK and Canada. The singles "There Must Be an Angel (Playing with My Heart)" topped the UK chart, and “Would I Lie to You?” topped the Australian chart. The duo continued their chart success with the album Revenge in 1986, which also peaked at number three in the UK, and went double platinum in the UK and Canada. The album reached number 2 in Australia spending 40 weeks in the top 10.

Eurythmics released their next studio album, Savage, in 1987, which peaked at number seven in the UK, reaching platinum status. In 1989, they released the album We Too Are One, which reached number 1 in the UK an achieved double platinum status. In 1990, the duo informally disbanded and their Greatest Hits album was released in 1991. It topped the UK album chart for 10 weeks, and the Australian chart for 7 weeks, achieving six-times platinum in the UK and triple platinum in the US, Canada and Australia.

Eurythmics reunited in 1999 and released their eighth and final studio album, Peace, which peaked at number four on the UK chart. A second greatest hits album, Ultimate Collection, was released in 2005, reaching the UK top 5 and has been certified triple platinum. Overall, the duo have sold over 75 million records worldwide.

== Albums ==
=== Studio albums ===
List of studio albums, with selected chart positions and certifications.
Title	Details	Peak chart positions											Certifications
Title	Details	UK	AUS	AUT	CAN	FRA	GER	NZ	NOR	SWE	SWI	US	Certifications
In the Garden	Released: 16 October 1981; Label: RCA (#PL70006); Formats: CD, cassette, LP	—	—	—	—	—	—	—	—	—	—	—	
Sweet Dreams (Are Made of This)	Released: 4 January 1983; Label: RCA (#RCALP 6063); Formats: CD, cassette, LP	3	5	—	6	4	6	2	—	14	—	15	BPI: Platinum; BVMI: Gold; MC: 2× Platinum; RIAA: Gold
Touch	Released: 14 November 1983; Label: RCA (#RCAPL 70109); Formats: CD, cassette, LP	1	4	—	3	20	9	1	8	9	14	7	BPI: Platinum; BVMI: Gold; MC: 2× Platinum; RIAA: Platinum; RMNZ: Platinum
Be Yourself Tonight	Released: 26 April 1985; Label: RCA (#RCAPL 70711); Formats: CD, cassette, LP	3	1	25	3	20	8	2	2	2	9	9	BPI: 2× Platinum; ARIA: Platinum; BVMI: Gold; MC: 2× Platinum; RIAA: Platinum; RMNZ: Platinum; SNEP: Gold
Revenge	Released: 30 June 1986; Label: RCA (#RCAPL 71050); Formats: CD, cassette, LP	3	2	6	4	12	5	1	1	1	7	12	BPI: 2× Platinum; ARIA: 4× Platinum; BVMI: Gold; MC: 2× Platinum; RIAA: Gold; RMNZ: 5× Platinum
Savage	Released: 9 November 1987; Label: RCA (#71555); Formats: CD, cassette, LP	7	15	17	9	26	23	7	10	2	10	41	BPI: Platinum; ARIA: Gold; IFPI SWI: Gold; MC: Platinum; RMNZ: Gold; SNEP: Gold
We Too Are One	Released: 11 September 1989; Label: RCA (#74251); Formats: CD, cassette, LP	1	7	20	12	11	4	8	3	1	2	34	BPI: 2× Platinum; ARIA: Platinum; IFPI SWE: Gold; IFPI SWI: Gold; MC: Platinum; SNEP: Gold
Peace	Released: 18 October 1999; Label: RCA (#743211695622); Formats: CD, cassette	4	8	7	9	6	2	—	22	5	2	25	BPI: Gold; BVMI: Gold; IFPI SWI: Gold; MC: Platinum; RIAA: Gold; SNEP: Gold
"—" denotes a recording that did not chart or was not released in that territory.

=== Soundtrack albums ===
Title	Details	Peak chart positions							Certifications
Title	Details	UK	AUS	CAN	NZ	SWE	SWI	US	Certifications
1984 (For the Love of Big Brother)	Released: 12 November 1984; Label: Virgin (#V1984); Formats: CD, cassette, LP	23	22	33	21	6	18	93	BPI: Gold; MC: Gold

=== Live albums ===
Title	Details	Peak chart positions				Certifications
Title	Details	UK	AUS	AUT	GER	Certifications
Live 1983–1989	Released: 15 November 1993; Label: RCA (#74321171452); Formats: CD, cassette	22	102	40	80	BPI: Gold

=== Compilation albums ===
Title	Details	Peak chart positions										Certifications
Title	Details	UK	AUS	AUT	CAN	GER	NZ	NOR	SWE	SWI	US	Certifications
Greatest Hits	Released: 18 March 1991; Label: RCA (#74856); Formats: CD, cassette, LP	1	1	1	10	1	1	5	8	2	72	BPI: 6× Platinum; ARIA: 3× Platinum; BVMI: 5× Gold; IFPI AUT: Platinum; IFPI NOR: Platinum; IFPI SWI: 2× Platinum; MC: 3× Platinum; RIAA: 3× Platinum; RMNZ: 4× Platinum; SNEP: Platinum
Ultimate Collection	Released: 7 November 2005; Label: RCA (#82876748412); Formats: CD, digital download	5	14	29	—	36	6	40	14	24	116	BPI: 3× Platinum; ARIA: 2× Platinum; BVMI: Platinum; RMNZ: Gold
"—" denotes a recording that did not chart or was not released in that territory.

=== Box sets ===
Title	Details	Notes
Boxed	Released: 14 November 2005; Label: RCA (#82876741362); Formats: CD, digital download	A box set containing remastered and expanded editions of In the Garden, Sweet Dreams (Are Made of This), Touch, Be Yourself Tonight, Revenge, Savage, We Too Are One and Peace.

== Remix albums ==
Title	Details	Peak chart positions	
Title	Details	UK	US
Touch Dance	Released: 28 May 1984; Label: RCA (#V70354); Formats: CD, cassette, LP	31	123

== Singles ==
List of singles, with selected chart positions and certifications, showing year released and originating album.
Title	Year	Peak chart positions										Certifications	Album
Title	Year	UK	AUS	CAN	GER	IRE	NL	NZ	SWE	SWI	US	Certifications	Album
"Never Gonna Cry Again"	1981	63	—	—	—	—	—	—	—	—	—		In the Garden
"Belinda"	1981	—	—	—	—	—	—	—	—	—	—		In the Garden
"This Is the House"	1982	—	—	—	—	—	—	—	—	—	—		Sweet Dreams (Are Made of This)
"The Walk"	1982	89	—	—	—	—	—	—	—	—	—		Sweet Dreams (Are Made of This)
"Love Is a Stranger"	1982	54	—	—	—	—	—	—	—	—	—		Sweet Dreams (Are Made of This)
"Sweet Dreams (Are Made of This)"	1983	2	6	1	4	2	9	2	—	8	1	BPI: 4× Platinum; BVMI: Platinum; MC: Gold; RIAA: Gold; RMNZ: 5× Platinum; SNEP: Gold	Sweet Dreams (Are Made of This)
"Love Is a Stranger" (reissue)	1983	6	17	15	12	4	13	20	—	—	23		Sweet Dreams (Are Made of This)
"Who's That Girl?"	1983	3	20	15	19	5	28	13	14	—	21		Touch
"Right by Your Side"	1983	10	15	39	61	15	20	9	13	—	29		Touch
"Here Comes the Rain Again"	1984	8	16	7	14	8	—	32	20	19	4	BPI: Silver; MC: Gold; RMNZ: Gold	Touch
"Sexcrime (Nineteen Eighty-Four)"	1984	4	5	18	3	4	10	8	3	6	81	BPI: Silver	1984 (For the Love of Big Brother)
"Julia"	1985	44	—	—	—	17	—	—	—	—	—		1984 (For the Love of Big Brother)
"Would I Lie to You?"	1985	17	1	5	34	10	23	5	10	21	5	ARIA: Gold; MC: Gold	Be Yourself Tonight
"There Must Be an Angel (Playing with My Heart)"	1985	1	3	12	4	1	4	5	2	—	22	BPI: Silver; MC: Gold; RMNZ: Gold	Be Yourself Tonight
"Sisters Are Doin' It for Themselves" (with Aretha Franklin)	1985	9	15	33	22	5	20	6	—	20	18		Be Yourself Tonight
"It's Alright (Baby's Coming Back)"	1985	12	32	37	22	8	20	18	—	23	78		Be Yourself Tonight
"When Tomorrow Comes"	1986	30	7	—	22	13	19	19	4	—	—		Revenge
"Missionary Man"	1986	31	9	13	—	13	—	12	—	—	14		Revenge
"Thorn in My Side"	1986	5	12	41	26	2	—	7	6	—	68	BPI: Silver; RMNZ: Gold	Revenge
"The Miracle of Love"	1986	23	14	—	53	10	31	30	18	21	—		Revenge
"Beethoven (I Love to Listen To)"	1987	25	13	—	28	11	—	6	9	19	—		Savage
"Shame"	1987	41	39	—	53	—	—	23	—	—	—		Savage
"I Need a Man"	1988	26	78	14	—	23	—	19	—	—	46		Savage
"You Have Placed a Chill in My Heart"	1988	16	—	55	—	15	—	31	—	—	64		Savage
"Revival"	1989	26	14	—	33	14	25	21	7	8	—		We Too Are One
"Don't Ask Me Why"	1989	25	35	13	56	17	—	—	—	30	40		We Too Are One
"The King and Queen of America"	1990	29	72	—	51	23	33	—	—	—	—		We Too Are One
"(My My) Baby's Gonna Cry"	1990	—	—	58	—	—	—	—	—	—	—		We Too Are One
"Angel"	1990	23	—	56	—	25	—	—	—	—	—		We Too Are One
"Love Is a Stranger" (second reissue)	1991	46	156	—	—	—	—	—	—	—	—		Greatest Hits
"Sweet Dreams (Are Made of This) '91" (remix)	1991	48	—	—	—	—	—	—	—	—	—		Greatest Hits
"I Saved the World Today"	1999	11	85	—	28	23	—	33	31	16	—		Peace
"17 Again"	2000	27	—	57	73	43	—	—	—	67	—		Peace
"Peace Is Just a Word"	2000	—	—	—	—	—	—	—	—	—	—		Peace
"I've Got a Life"	2005	14	—	—	—	38	—	—	—	36	—		Ultimate Collection
"—" denotes a recording that did not chart or was not released in that territory.

=== Promotional singles ===
Title	Year	Album
"Power to the Meek" (US promo single)	2000	Peace

== Videography ==
=== Video albums/collections ===
Title	Details	Notes
Sweet Dreams – The Video Album	Released: 1983; Label: RCA; Formats: VHS/LaserDisc/DVD	Live concert recording in 1983 at the London nightclub Heaven.
Brand New Day	Released: 1987; Label: K Films; Formats: VHS (SECAM)	This film highlights the Japanese leg of Eurythmics' Revenge Tour by Israeli filmmaker Amos Gitai and was released in France.
Eurythmics Live	Released: 1987; Label: RCA; Formats: VHS/LaserDisc	Live concert recording of the Revenge tour in 1987 in Sydney, Australia.
Savage	Released: 1988; Label: RCA; Formats: VHS/LaserDisc	Video album featuring promos for the entire Savage album.
We Two Are One Too	Released: 1990; Label: RCA; Formats: VHS/LaserDisc	Video album featuring promo videos, montages and live footage (both on and off stage) from the album We Too Are One.
Greatest Hits	Released: 1991; Label: RCA; Formats: VHS/LaserDisc/DVD	Video compilation, 21 tracks.
Peacetour	Released: 2000; Label: BMG; Formats: VHS/DVD	Live concert recording of the Peace tour at the London Docklands in 1999.
Ultimate Collection	Released: 2005; Label: Sony; Formats: DVD	Video compilation, 17 tracks.

=== Music videos ===
Title	Year	Director
"Never Gonna Cry Again"	1981	
"The Walk"	1982	Marek Budzynski
"Love Is a Stranger"	1983	Mike Brady
"Sweet Dreams (Are Made of This)"	1983	Chris Ashbrook & Dave Stewart
"Who's That Girl"	1983	Duncan Gibbons
"Right by Your Side"	1983	Chris Ashbrook & Jon Roseman
"Here Comes the Rain Again"	1984	Michael A. Simon
"Sexcrime (1984)"	1984	Chris Ashbrook
"Julia"	1984	Chris Ashbrook
"Would I Lie to You?"	1985	Mary Lambert
"There Must Be an Angel (Playing with My Heart)"	1985	Eddie Arno & Mark Innocenti
"Sisters Are Doin' It for Themselves" (with Aretha Franklin)	1985	Eddie Arno & Mark Innocenti
"It's Alright (Baby's Coming Back)"	1985	Willy Smax
"When Tomorrow Comes"	1986	Chris Ashbrook & Dave Stewart
"Thorn in My Side"	1986	Chris Ashbrook & Dave Stewart
"The Miracle of Love"	1986	Dave Stewart
"Missionary Man"	1986	Willy Smax
"Beethoven (I Love to Listen To)"	1987	Sophie Muller
"Shame"	1987	Steve Graham & Eric Scott
"Heaven"	1988	Sophie Muller
"I Need a Man"	1988	Sophie Muller
"Wide-Eyed Girl"	1988	Sophie Muller
"Do You Want to Break Up?"	1988	Sophie Muller
"I've Got a Lover (Back in Japan)"	1988	Sophie Muller
"Put the Blame on Me"	1988	Sophie Muller
"Savage"	1988	Sophie Muller
"You Have Placed a Chill in My Heart"	1988	Sophie Muller
"I Need You"	1988	Sophie Muller
"Brand New Day"	1988	Sophie Muller
"Revival"	1989	Philippe Gautier
"Don't Ask Me Why"	1989	Sophie Muller
"The King and Queen of America"	1990	Willy Smax
"Angel"	1990	Sophie Muller
"(My My) Baby's Gonna Cry"	1990	Sophie Muller
"I Saved the World Today"	1999	Dave Stewart
"17 Again"	2000	Dave Stewart
"I've Got a Life"	2005	Matthew Rolston

== Other appearances ==
Title	Year	Album
"Winter Wonderland"	1987	A Very Special Christmas
"Revenge (Part II)"	1989	Rooftops – Soundtrack
"Here Comes the Rain Again" (new version)	1989	Lily Was Here – Soundtrack
"Sweet Dreams (Are Made of This)" (live)	1994	Grammy's Greatest Moments, Volume I
