= Boxed (Eurythmics) =

Box set by Eurythmics
- Released: 14 November 2005
- Recorded: 1981–1999
- Genres: New wave; electronica; synth-pop; dance-pop
- Length: 9:16:08
- Label: RCA
- Producers: David A. Stewart; Robert Crash; Adam Williams; Conny Plank; Jimmy Iovine; Andy Wright

Eurythmics chronology
Ultimate Collection (2005)	Boxed (2005)

Boxed is a box set by the British pop duo Eurythmics. It was released on 14 November 2005 by RCA Records and contains eight digitally remastered albums including 43 bonus tracks.

Many of the bonus tracks originally appeared as B-sides and extra tracks on various single releases (although the selection was not exhaustive). A selection of cover versions, recorded by Eurythmics for the aborted "TV Planet" project, are also included.

== Included albums ==
Boxed features all eight studio albums originally released by RCA Records remastered and expanded.

The following albums are included in Boxed:

- In the Garden (1981)
- Sweet Dreams (Are Made of This) (1983)
- Touch (1983)
- Be Yourself Tonight (1985)
- Revenge (1986)
- Savage (1987)
- We Too Are One (1989)
- Peace (1999)

The EP Touch Dance (exclusively consisting of remixes from the 1983 Touch album), the soundtrack album 1984 (For the Love of Big Brother) (released through Virgin Records – now an EMI sublabel – rather than RCA Records), and the live album Live 1983–1989 are not included in the set.

Each expanded release includes a selection of B-sides, and/or remixes, and/or live tracks. Also scattered across seven of the eight expanded releases are a selection of seven cover songs from a never-realized project called TV Planet. Announced in early 1986, TV Planet was to have been an animated television show which took place on a world that had forgotten about music; the lead characters would re-introduce music to this world. The show never got past the planning stages.

While the recording dates of the TV Planet cover songs are not detailed anywhere in the package, they would appear to date from anywhere between 1983 and 1988, or later. "Satellite of Love" initially made its appearance on a cassette-only compilation of Eurythmics rarities in late 1983, and at least one track, "Last Night I Dreamt That Somebody Loved Me", could not have been recorded any earlier than late 1987, as the original recording by The Smiths was issued in September of that year.

== Track listings ==
All songs were written by Annie Lennox and David A. Stewart unless otherwise stated.

=== In the Garden (1981) ===
Original album with 5 bonus tracks.

No.	Title	Writer(s)	Original release	Length
1.	"English Summer"	Lennox; Stewart; Roger Pomphrey		4:00
2.	"Belinda"			3:58
3.	"Take Me to Your Heart"			3:32
4.	"She's Invisible Now"			3:27
5.	"Your Time Will Come"			4:30
6.	"Caveman Head"	Lennox; Stewart; Pomphrey		3:56
7.	"Never Gonna Cry Again"			3:02
8.	"All the Young (People of Today)"			4:11
9.	"Sing-Sing"			4:03
10.	"Revenge"			4:31
11.	"Le Sinistre"		"Never Gonna Cry Again" 7" single	2:44
12.	"Heartbeat Heartbeat"		"Belinda" 7" single	2:02
13.	"Never Gonna Cry Again" (Live)		"This Is the House" 12" single	4:36
14.	"4/4 in Leather" (Live)		"This Is the House" 12" single	3:05
15.	"Take Me to Your Heart" (Live)		"This Is the House" 12" single	4:57
Total length:				57:34

=== Sweet Dreams (Are Made of This) (1983) ===
Original album with 6 bonus tracks.

No.	Title	Writer(s)	Original release	Length
1.	"Love Is a Stranger"			3:43
2.	"I've Got an Angel"			2:44
3.	"Wrap It Up"	Isaac Hayes; David Porter		3:33
4.	"I Could Give You (A Mirror)"			3:51
5.	"The Walk"			4:40
6.	"Sweet Dreams (Are Made of This)"			3:26
7.	"Jennifer"			5:05
8.	"This Is the House"			5:00
9.	"Somebody Told Me"			3:29
10.	"This City Never Sleeps"			6:40
11.	"Home Is Where the Heart Is"		"This Is the House" 7" single	3:02
12.	"Monkey Monkey"		"Love Is a Stranger" 7" single	3:33
13.	"Baby's Gone Blue"		"Sweet Dreams (Are Made of This)" 12" single	5:16
14.	"Sweet Dreams (Are Made of This)" (Hot Remix)		"Sweet Dreams (Are Made of This)" (1991) 12" single	5:17
15.	"Love Is a Stranger" (Coldcut remix)		"Love Is a Stranger" (1991) 12" single	7:18
16.	"Satellite of Love"	Lou Reed	Previously unreleased – From "TV Planet" project	4:37
Total length:				71:14

=== Touch (1983) ===
Original album with 7 bonus tracks.

No.	Title	Writer(s)	Original release	Length
1.	"Here Comes the Rain Again"			4:50
2.	"Regrets"			4:39
3.	"Right by Your Side"			3:59
4.	"Cool Blue"			4:44
5.	"Who's That Girl?"			4:47
6.	"The First Cut"			4:42
7.	"Aqua"			4:33
8.	"No Fear, No Hate, No Pain (No Broken Hearts)"			5:22
9.	"Paint a Rumour"			7:33
10.	"You Take Some Lentils and You Take Some Rice"		"Who's That Girl?" 7" single	3:01
11.	"ABC (Freeform)"	Stewart; Timothy Wheater; Nadine Masseron	"Who's That Girl?" 12" single	2:36
12.	"Plus Something Else"		"Right By Your Side" 12" single	5:20
13.	"Paint a Rumour" (Long version)		"Here Comes the Rain Come Again" 12" single	7:57
14.	"Who's That Girl?" (Live)		"Miracle of Love" 12" single	3:28
15.	"Here Comes the Rain Again" (Live)		Previously unreleased	3:07
16.	"Fame"	Carlos Alomar; David Bowie; John Lennon	Previously unreleased – From "TV Planet" project	2:39
Total length:				73:06

=== Be Yourself Tonight (1985) ===
Original album with 7 bonus tracks.

No.	Title	Writer(s)	Original release	Length
1.	"Would I Lie to You?"			4:25
2.	"There Must Be an Angel (Playing with My Heart)"			5:22
3.	"I Love You Like a Ball and Chain"			4:04
4.	"Sisters Are Doin' It for Themselves" (featuring Aretha Franklin)			5:54
5.	"Conditioned Soul"			4:30
6.	"Adrian"			4:29
7.	"It's Alright (Baby's Coming Back)"			3:45
8.	"Here Comes That Sinking Feeling"			5:40
9.	"Better to Have Lost in Love (Than Never to Have Loved at All) (Note: Incorrectly labelled "Better to Have Lost in Love (Then Never to Have Loved at All)".)"			5:06
10.	"Grown Up Girls"		"There Must Be an Angel (Playing with My Heart)" 7" single	4:12
11.	"Tous les garçons et les filles"	Françoise Hardy; Roger Samy	"It's Alright (Baby's Coming Back)" 12" single	3:25
12.	"Sisters Are Doin' It for Themselves" (ET Mix)		"Sisters Are Doin' It for Themselves" 12" single	7:48
13.	"Would I Lie to You?" (Extended version (Note: "Would I Lie to You?" is incorrectly stated as the Eric Thorngren mix on the album, when it is actually the extended mix from the B-side of the 12" single.))		"Would I Lie to You?" 12" single	4:54
14.	"Conditioned Soul" (Live)		Previously unreleased	5:07
15.	"Hello, I Love You"	Jim Morrison; Robby Krieger; Ray Manzarek; John Densmore	Previously unreleased – From "TV Planet" project	2:50
Total length:				71:31

=== Revenge (1986) ===
Original album with 6 bonus tracks.

No.	Title	Writer(s)	Original release	Length
1.	"Missionary Man"			4:26
2.	"Thorn in My Side"			4:11
3.	"When Tomorrow Comes"	Lennox; Stewart; Patrick Seymour		4:28
4.	"The Last Time"			4:10
5.	"The Miracle of Love"			5:04
6.	"Let's Go"			4:08
7.	"Take Your Pain Away"			4:30
8.	"A Little of You"			3:53
9.	"In This Town"			3:44
10.	"I Remember You"			5:00
11.	"When Tomorrow Comes" (Extended version)		"When Tomorrow Comes" 12" single	6:36
12.	"Thorn in My Side" (Extended version)		"Thorn in My Side" 12" single	6:54
13.	"Missionary Man" (Extended version)		"Missionary Man" 12" single	6:50
14.	"When Tomorrow Comes" (Live Acoustic version)	Lennox; Stewart; Seymour	Previously unreleased	3:19
15.	"Revenge 2"		Rooftops soundtrack	5:40
16.	"My Guy"	Smokey Robinson; Ronald White	Previously unreleased – From "TV Planet" project	1:56
Total length:				74:45

=== Savage (1987) ===
Original album with 5 bonus tracks.

No.	Title	Writer(s)	Original release	Length
1.	"Beethoven (I Love to Listen to)"			4:53
2.	"I've Got a Lover (Back in Japan)"			4:30
3.	"Do You Want to Break Up?"			3:38
4.	"You Have Placed a Chill in My Heart"			3:50
5.	"Shame"			4:28
6.	"Savage"			4:10
7.	"I Need a Man"			4:21
8.	"Put the Blame on Me"			3:44
9.	"Heaven"			3:28
10.	"Wide Eyed Girl"			3:31
11.	"I Need You"			3:22
12.	"Brand New Day"			3:42
13.	"Beethoven (I Love to Listen To)" (Extended Philharmonic version)		Previously unreleased (Note: Listed as being from the "Beethoven (I Love to Listen To)" 12" single, but is actually a previously unreleased version that is different to the 12" version.)	4:31
14.	"Shame" (Dance Mix)		"Shame" 12" single	5:38
15.	"I Need a Man" (Macho Mix)		"I Need a Man" 12" single	5:55
16.	"I Need a Man" (Live)		Previously unreleased	3:07
17.	"Come Together"	John Lennon; Paul McCartney	Previously unreleased – From "TV Planet" project	3:20
Total length:				66:58

=== We Too Are One (1989) ===
Original album with 6 bonus tracks.

No.	Title	Writer(s)	Original release	Length
1.	"We Too Are One"			4:31
2.	"The King and Queen of America"			4:31
3.	"(My My) Baby's Gonna Cry"			4:54
4.	"Don't Ask Me Why"			4:21
5.	"Angel"			5:10
6.	"Revival"	Stewart; Lennox; Charlie Wilson; Seymour		4:04
7.	"You Hurt Me (And I Hate You)"	Lennox; Stewart; Chucho Merchán		4:23
8.	"Sylvia"			4:44
9.	"How Long?"			4:41
10.	"When the Day Goes Down"			5:57
11.	"Precious"		"Revival" 7" single	3:36
12.	"See No Evil"		"The King and Queen of America" 7" single	4:06
13.	"The King and Queen of America" (Dance remix)		"The King and Queen of America" 12" single	6:11
14.	"Angel" (Choir version)		"Angel" 7" single	5:47
15.	"Last Night I Dreamt That Somebody Loved Me"	Morrissey; Johnny Marr	Previously unreleased – From "TV Planet" project	3:24
Total length:				73:20

=== Peace (1999) ===
Original album with 4 bonus tracks.

No.	Title	Writer(s)	Original release	Length
1.	"17 Again (Note: Alternate mix compared to 1999 release.)"			4:55
2.	"I Saved the World Today (Note: Alternate mix compared to 1999 release.)"			4:53
3.	"Power to the Meek (Note: Alternate mix compared to 1999 release.)"			3:31
4.	"Beautiful Child"			3:27
5.	"Anything But Strong"			5:04
6.	"Peace Is Just a Word"			5:59
7.	"I've Tried Everything (Note: Alternate mix compared to 1999 release.)"			4:17
8.	"I Want It All"			3:32
9.	"My True Love"			4:45
10.	"Forever (Note: Alternate mix compared to 1999 release.)"			4:08
11.	"Lifted"			4:49
12.	"Beautiful Child" (Acoustic version)		Previously unreleased	3:18
13.	"17 Again" (Acoustic version)		Previously unreleased	4:27
14.	"I Saved the World Today" (Acoustic version)		Previously unreleased	2:32
15.	"Something in the Air"	Speedy Keen	Previously unreleased – From "TV Planet" project	3:46
Total length:				62:41

== See also ==
- Eurythmics discography
- 2005 in music
