= Greatest Hits (Eurythmics album) =

1991 greatest hits album by Eurythmics

Greatest hits album by Eurythmics
- Released: 18 March 1991
- Recorded: 1982–1989
- Genres: New wave; synth-pop; pop rock
- Length: 77:19
- Label: RCA
- Producers: David A. Stewart; Adam Williams; Jimmy Iovine

Eurythmics chronology
We Too Are One (1989)	Greatest Hits (1991)	Live 1983–1989 (1993)

Singles from Greatest Hits
- 1. "Love Is a Stranger" Released: 25 February 1991; 2. "Sweet Dreams (Are Made of This) '91" Released: 28 October 1991

Professional ratings
Review scores
Source	Rating
AllMusic	4.5/5 stars
Calgary Herald	B
Robert Christgau	A−
Entertainment Weekly	B+
New Musical Express	8/10
Tom Hull – on the Web	B+
Q Magazine	5/5 stars

Greatest Hits is a greatest hits album by British pop duo Eurythmics, released on 18 March 1991 by RCA Records. It contains their successful singles spanning the years 1982 through 1990. The album topped the charts in the United Kingdom for a total of 10 weeks, in New Zealand for eight weeks and in Australia for seven weeks. It remains the duo's best-selling album worldwide and has been certified six-times platinum in the United Kingdom and triple platinum in the United States. Phil Sutcliffe in Q Magazine noted that "this compilation portrays, for once, a band accorded precise justice by the singles charts".

The original European version of the album contains 18 tracks, while the version released in the US contains only 14. The five songs omitted from the US edition are "Right by Your Side", "Sexcrime (Nineteen Eighty-Four)", "It's Alright (Baby's Coming Back)", "You Have Placed a Chill in My Heart" and "The Miracle of Love", while "The King and Queen of America" is added. The track order also differs.

== Track listing ==
All tracks are written by Annie Lennox and David A. Stewart, except "When Tomorrow Comes" co-written by Patrick Seymour.

International CD / cassette version
No.	Title	Album	Length
1.	"Love Is a Stranger"	Sweet Dreams (Are Made of This) (1982)	3:40
2.	"Sweet Dreams (Are Made of This)" (12" version)	Sweet Dreams (Are Made of This) (1983)	4:50
3.	"Who's That Girl?"	Touch (1983)	3:44
4.	"Right by Your Side"	Touch (1983)	3:49
5.	"Here Comes the Rain Again"	Touch (1983)	4:59
6.	"There Must Be an Angel (Playing with My Heart)"	Be Yourself Tonight (1985)	4:41
7.	"Sisters Are Doin' It for Themselves" (with Aretha Franklin)	Be Yourself Tonight (1985)	5:51
8.	"It's Alright (Baby's Coming Back)"	Be Yourself Tonight (1985)	3:43
9.	"When Tomorrow Comes"	Revenge (1986)	4:15
10.	"You Have Placed a Chill in My Heart"	Savage (1987)	3:46
11.	"The Miracle of Love"	Revenge (1986)	4:35
12.	"Sex Crime (1984)"	1984 (For the Love of Big Brother) (1984)	3:52
13.	"Thorn in My Side"	Revenge (1986)	4:11
14.	"Don't Ask Me Why"	We Too Are One (1989)	4:13
15.	"Angel"	We Too Are One (1989)	4:47
16.	"Would I Lie to You?"	Be Yourself Tonight (1985)	4:22
17.	"Missionary Man"	Revenge (1986)	3:45
18.	"I Need a Man"	Savage (1987)	4:21
Total length:			77:19

US CD / cassette version
No.	Title	Note	Length
1.	"Sweet Dreams (Are Made of This)" (12-inch version)	Previously unreleased on CD	4:50
2.	"When Tomorrow Comes" (LP version)		4:25
3.	"Here Comes the Rain Again" (12-inch version)	Previously unreleased on CD	5:03
4.	"Who's That Girl?" (short version)	Previously unreleased on CD	3:44
5.	"Would I Lie to You?" (LP version)		4:22
6.	"Sisters Are Doin' It for Themselves" (with Aretha Franklin) (LP version)		5:54
7.	"There Must Be an Angel (Playing with My Heart)" (LP version)		5:19
8.	"Missionary Man" (7-inch version)	Previously unreleased on CD	3:45
9.	"Don't Ask Me Why" (short LP version)		4:13
10.	"I Need a Man" (LP version)		4:21
11.	"Love Is a Stranger" (LP version)		3:40
12.	"Thorn in My Side" (LP version)		4:11
13.	"The King and Queen of America" (LP version)		4:31
14.	"Angel" (Greatest Hits edit)		4:58
Total length:			63:16

LP version (side one)
No.	Title	Length
1.	"Love Is a Stranger"	3:40
2.	"Sweet Dreams (Are Made of This)"	4:50
3.	"Who's That Girl?"	3:44
4.	"Right by Your Side"	3:49
5.	"Here Comes the Rain Again"	5:03
6.	"There Must Be an Angel (Playing with My Heart)"	5:19

LP version (side two)
No.	Title	Length
7.	"Sisters Are Doin' It for Themselves" (with Aretha Franklin)	5:54
8.	"It's Alright (Baby's Coming Back)"	3:43
9.	"When Tomorrow Comes"	4:25
10.	"You Have Placed a Chill in My Heart"	3:46
11.	"Sex Crime (1984)"	3:52
12.	"Thorn in My Side"	4:11
13.	"Don't Ask Me Why"	4:13
Total length:		56:29

== Personnel ==
Credits adapted from the liner notes of Greatest Hits.

- David A. Stewart – production (all tracks)
- Adam Williams – production (track 1)
- Jimmy Iovine – production (tracks 14, 15)
- Jon Bavin – engineering (tracks 3, 5, 9, 11, 13, 17)
- Fred Defaye – engineering (track 10)
- Eric Thorngren – engineering (track 12)
- Manu Guiot – engineering (tracks 9, 11, 13, 17, 18)
- Sophie Muller – cover picture
- Laurence Stevens – art, design
- Annie Lennox – art, design

== Charts ==
=== Weekly charts ===
1991 weekly chart performance for Greatest Hits
Chart (1991)	Peak position
Australian Albums (ARIA)	1
Austrian Albums (Ö3 Austria)	1
Belgian Albums (IFPI)	1
Canada Top Albums/CDs (RPM)	10
Danish Albums (Hitlisten)	4
Dutch Albums (Album Top 100)	1
European Albums (Music & Media)	1
Finnish Albums (Suomen virallinen lista)	4
French Albums (IFOP)	1
German Albums (Offizielle Top 100)	1
Greek Albums (IFPI)	2
Irish Albums (IFPI)	1
Italian Albums (Musica e dischi)	5
New Zealand Albums (RMNZ)	1
Norwegian Albums (VG-lista)	5
Portuguese Albums (UNEVA)	6
Spanish Albums (AFYVE)	4
Swedish Albums (Sverigetopplistan)	8
Swiss Albums (Schweizer Hitparade)	2
UK Albums (Official Charts)	1
US Billboard 200	72

2001 weekly chart performance for Greatest Hits
Chart (2001)	Peak position
Hungarian Albums (MAHASZ)	8

2026 weekly chart performance for Greatest Hits
Chart (2026)	Peak position
Greek Albums (IFPI)	73

=== Year-end charts ===
1991 year-end chart performance for Greatest Hits
Chart (1991)	Position
Australian Albums (ARIA)	3
Austrian Albums (Ö3 Austria)	4
Canada Top Albums/CDs (RPM)	46
Dutch Albums (Album Top 100)	8
European Albums (Music & Media)	5
German Albums (Offizielle Top 100)	4
New Zealand Albums (RMNZ)	1
Swiss Albums (Schweizer Hitparade)	10
UK Albums (OCC)	2

2000 year-end chart performance for Greatest Hits
Chart (2000)	Position
UK Albums (OCC)	99

2002 year-end chart performance for Greatest Hits
Chart (2002)	Position
Canadian Alternative Albums (Nielsen SoundScan)	76

== Certifications ==
Certifications for Greatest Hits
Region	Certification	Certified units/sales
Australia (ARIA)	3× Platinum	210,000^{^}
Austria (IFPI Austria)	Platinum	50,000^{*}
Canada (Music Canada)	3× Platinum	300,000^{^}
Finland (Musiikkituottajat)	Gold	32,801
France (SNEP)	Platinum	300,000^{*}
Germany (BVMI)	5× Gold	1,250,000^{‡}
Japan (RIAJ)	Gold	100,000^{^}
Netherlands (NVPI)	Platinum	100,000^{^}
New Zealand (RMNZ)	4× Platinum	60,000^{^}
Norway (IFPI Norway)	Platinum	50,000^{*}
Spain (Promusicae)	Platinum	100,000^{^}
Sweden (GLF)	Platinum	100,000^{^}
Switzerland (IFPI Switzerland)	2× Platinum	100,000^{^}
United Kingdom (BPI)	6× Platinum	2,055,996
United States (RIAA)	3× Platinum	3,000,000^{^}
^{*} Sales figures based on certification alone.^{^} Shipments figures based on certification alone.^{‡} Sales+streaming figures based on certification alone.

== Video version ==
Greatest Hits

Video by Eurythmics
- Released: 14 May 1991
- Recorded: 1982–1989
- Length: 95 minutes
- Label: BMG Video

Eurythmics chronology
We Two Are One Too (1990)	Greatest Hits (1991)	Peacetour (2000)

A version of the compilation with 21 music videos was also released, on VHS and LaserDisc in 1991, and on DVD in 2000. Although it includes three more songs than the European audio version, and seven more than the US audio version, it still omits the videos for the singles "Never Gonna Cry Again" (1981), "The Walk" (1982), "Shame" (1987), "Revival" (1989) and "(My My) Baby's Gonna Cry" (1989, US/Canada-only single). In contrast to the audio versions of the compilation, the music videos are presented in chronological order, with short collages (made from snippets from the videos) between the songs.

No.	Title	Director(s)	Length
1.	"Sweet Dreams"	Chris Ashbrook; Dave Stewart
2.	"Love Is a Stranger"	Mike Brady
3.	"Who's That Girl?"	Duncan Gibbins
4.	"Right by Your Side"	Chris Ashbrook; Jon Roseman
5.	"Here Comes the Rain Again"	Dave Stewart; John Gerschfield; John Roseman
6.	"Sex Crime (1984)"	Chris Ashbrook
7.	"Julia"	Chris Ashbrook
8.	"Would I Lie to You?"	Mary Lambert
9.	"There Must Be an Angel (Playing with My Heart)"	Eddie Arno; Mark Innocenti
10.	"Sisters Are Doin' It for Themselves"	Eddie Arno; Mark Innocenti
11.	"It's Alright (Baby's Coming Back)"	Willy Smax
12.	"When Tomorrow Comes"	Chris Ashbrook; Dave Stewart
13.	"Thorn in My Side"	Chris Ashbrook; Dave Stewart
14.	"Miracle of Love"	Dave Stewart
15.	"Missionary Man"	Willy Smax
16.	"Beethoven (I Love to Listen To)"	Sophie Muller
17.	"I Need a Man"	Sophie Muller
18.	"You Have Placed a Chill in My Heart"	Sophie Muller
19.	"Don't Ask Me Why"	Sophie Muller
20.	"The King & Queen of America"	Willy Smax
21.	"Angel"	Sophie Muller

=== Charts ===
Chart performance for Greatest Hits
Chart (1991)	Peak position
UK Top Music Videos (Music Week/Gallup)	1
US Top Music Videos (Billboard)	13
Chart (2003)	Peak position
Swedish Music DVD (Sverigetopplistan)	2

=== Certifications ===
Certifications for Greatest Hits
Region	Certification	Certified units/sales
Canada (Music Canada)	Gold	5,000^{^}
^{^} Shipments figures based on certification alone.
