= List of awards and nominations received by Annie Lennox =

Annie Lennox awards and nominations
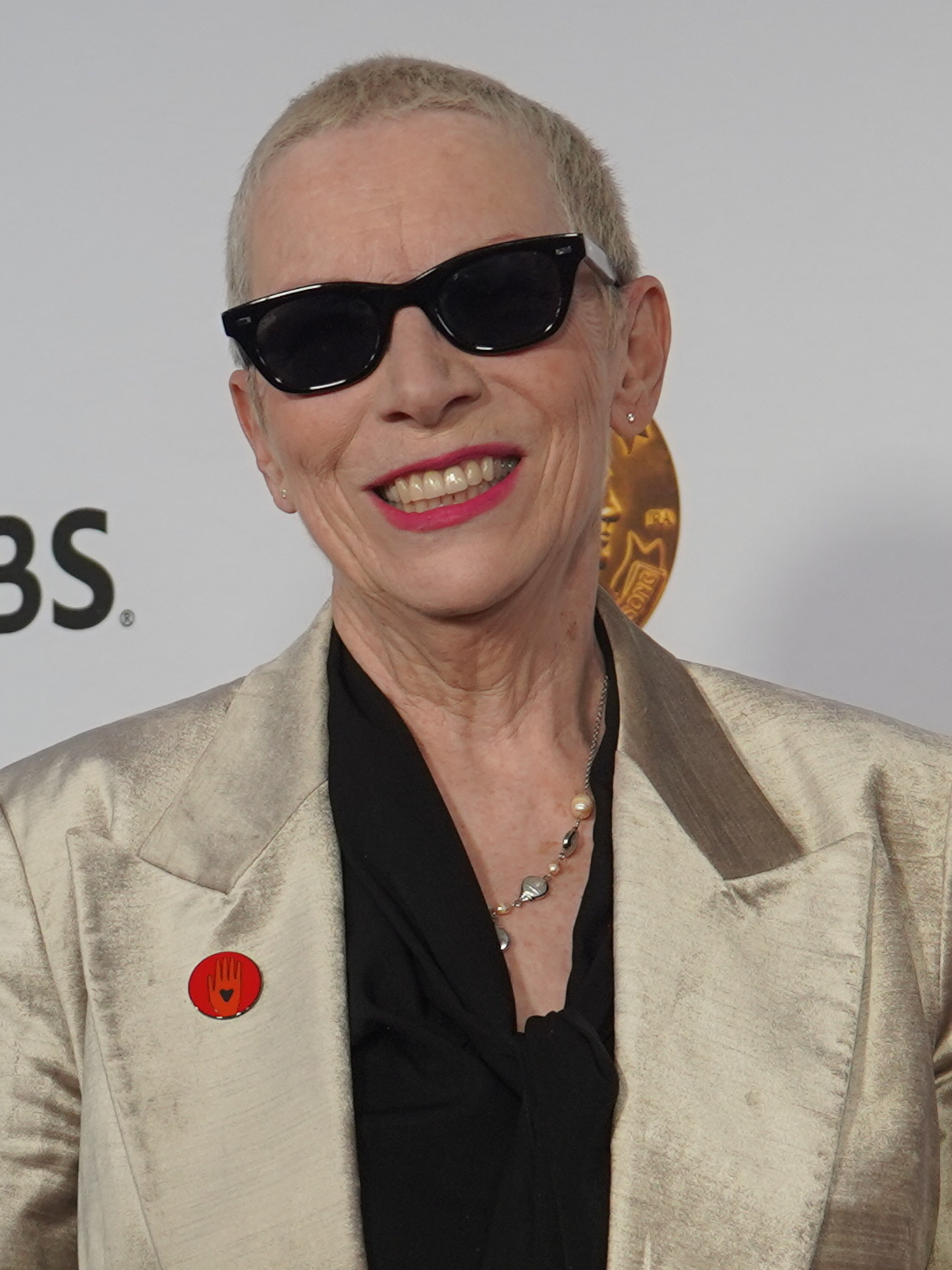
- Lennox at the 2024 Library of Congress Gershwin Prize ceremony
Awards and nominations
Award	Wins	Nominations
Billboard	1	15
Brit	8	12
Echo	1	2
Grammy	4	11
Ivor Novello	4	8
MTV VMA	2	16

Totals (Note: Certain award groups do not simply award one winner. They acknowledge several different recipients, have runners-up, and have third place. Since this is a specific recognition and is different from losing an award, runner-up mentions are considered wins in this award tally. For simplification and to avoid errors, each award in this list has been presumed to have had a prior nomination.)
- Wins: 36
- Nominations: 75

This is a complete listing of awards and nominations received by Scottish singer and humanitarian Annie Lennox, both as a solo artist and as part of the duo Eurythmics. With eight Brit Awards, which includes being named Best British Female Artist a record six times, Lennox has been named the "Brits Champion of Champions". She has also collected four Grammy Awards and an MTV Video Music Award. In 2002, Lennox received a Billboard Century Award; the highest accolade from Billboard. In 2004, she received the Golden Globe and the Academy Award for Best Original Song for "Into the West", written for the soundtrack to the feature film The Lord of the Rings: The Return of the King.

She has been named "The Greatest White Soul Singer Alive" by VH1 and one of The 100 Greatest Singers of All Time by Rolling Stone. In 2012, she was rated No. 22 on VH1's 100 Greatest Women in Music. In June 2013 the Official Charts Company called her "the most successful female British artist in UK music history". As of June 2008, including her work with Eurythmics, Lennox had sold over 80 million records worldwide.

A former member of the British duo Eurythmics, originally between 1980 until 1990, and again from 1999 until 2005 (with one off reunions in 2014, 2019 and 2020, Lennox has received awards and nominations for both her solo work and as a member of Eurthymics. Notable awards won by Eurthymics include the MTV Video Music Award for Best New Artist in 1984, the Grammy Award for Best Rock Performance by a Duo or Group with Vocal in 1987, and the Brit Award for Outstanding Contribution to Music in 1999. Lennox was inducted into the UK Music Hall of Fame in 2005, the Songwriters Hall of Fame in 2020, and the Rock and Roll Hall of Fame in 2022 as part of Eurthymics.

== Awards and nominations ==
=== For music, performance and humanitarian work ===
Award	Year	Nominee(s)	Category	Result	Ref.
Academy Awards	2004	"Into the West"	Best Original Song	Won	
American Music Awards	2008	Herself	AMA Award of Merit	Won	
ASCAP Pop Music Awards	1984	"Here Comes the Rain Again"	Most Performed Songs	Won	
ASCAP Pop Music Awards	1994	"Walking on Broken Glass"	Most Performed Songs	Won	
Billboard Music Awards	1983	"Sweet Dreams (Are Made of This)"	Top Hot 100 Song	Nominated	
Billboard Music Awards	1984	Eurythmics	Top Disco Artist – Duo/Group	Nominated	
Billboard Music Awards	1985	Eurythmics	Top Artist	Nominated	
Billboard Music Awards	1985	Eurythmics	Top Billboard 200 Artist	Nominated	
Billboard Music Awards	1985	Eurythmics	Top Hot 100 Artist	Nominated	
Billboard Music Awards	1985	Eurythmics	Top Hot 100 Artist – Duo/Group	Nominated	
Billboard Music Awards	1985	Eurythmics	Top Dance Club Play Artist	Nominated	
Billboard Music Awards	1985	Be Yourself Tonight	Top Billboard 200 Album	Nominated	
Billboard Music Awards	1985	Be Yourself Tonight	Top Compact Disk	Nominated	
Billboard Music Awards	1985	"Would I Lie to You?"	Top Hot 100 Song	Nominated	
Billboard Music Awards	1985	"Sexcrime"	Top Dance Play Single	Nominated	
Billboard Music Awards	1986	Eurythmics	Top Billboard 200 Artist	Nominated	
Billboard Music Awards	1986	Eurythmics	Top Hot 100 Artist	Nominated	
Billboard Music Awards	2002	Herself	Century Award	Won	
Billboard Music Awards	2004	Herself	Top Hot Dance Club Play Artist	Nominated	
Billboard Music Awards	2004	"A Thousand Beautiful Things"	Top Hot Dance Club Play Single	Nominated	
Billboard Music Video Awards	1992	"Why"	Best Pop/Rock Female Video	Nominated	
Brit Awards	1984	Eurythmics	British Group	Nominated	
Brit Awards	1984	Herself	British Female Solo Artist	Won	
Brit Awards	1985	Herself	British Female Solo Artist	Nominated	
Brit Awards	1986	Herself	British Female Solo Artist	Won	
Brit Awards	1986	Eurythmics	British Group	Nominated	
Brit Awards	1986	Be Yourself Tonight	British Album of the Year	Nominated	
Brit Awards	1987	Eurythmics	British Group	Nominated	
Brit Awards	1989	Herself	British Female Solo Artist	Won	
Brit Awards	1990	Herself	British Female Solo Artist	Won	
Brit Awards	1990	Eurythmics	British Group	Nominated	
Brit Awards	1990	We Too Are One	British Album of the Year	Nominated	
Brit Awards	1990	"Don't Ask Me Why"	British Video of the Year	Nominated	
Brit Awards	1992	Herself	British Female Solo Artist	Nominated	
Brit Awards	1993	Herself	British Female Solo Artist	Won	
Brit Awards	1993	Diva	British Album of the Year	Won	
Brit Awards	1993	"Walking on Broken Glass"	British Video of the Year	Nominated	
Brit Awards	1996	Herself	British Female Solo Artist	Won	
Brit Awards	1999	Eurythmics	Outstanding Contribution to Music	Won	
Brit Awards	2004	Herself	British Female Solo Artist	Nominated	
Brit Awards	2010	"There Must Be an Angel"	Live Performance of 30 Years	Nominated	
British LGBT Awards	2015	Herself	Best Music Artist	Nominated	
British LGBT Awards	2017	Herself	Celebrity Ally	Nominated	
British LGBT Awards	2018	Herself	Celebrity Ally	Nominated	
ECHO Awards	1992	Eurythmics	Best International Group	Nominated	
ECHO Awards	1993	Herself	Best International Female	Won	
ECHO Awards	1996	Herself	Best International Female	Nominated	
Edison Awards	1986	Eurythmics	Best International Pop	Won	
Emmy Awards	2016	"I Put a Spell on You" on The Talk	Outstanding Musical Performance in a Talk Show/Morning Program	Nominated	
Golden Globe Awards	2003	"Into the West"	Best Original Song	Won	
Golden Globe Awards	2019	"Requiem for A Private War"	Best Original Song	Nominated	
Grammy Awards	1984	Eurythmics	Best New Artist	Nominated	
Grammy Awards	1985	Eurythmics Sweet Dreams: The Video Album	Best Video Album	Nominated	
Grammy Awards	1986	"Sisters Are Doin' It for Themselves" (with Aretha Franklin)	Best R&B Performance by a Duo or Group with Vocal	Nominated	
Grammy Awards	1986	"Would I Lie to You?"	Best Rock Performance by a Duo or Group with Vocal	Nominated	
Grammy Awards	1987	"Missionary Man"	Best Rock Performance by a Duo or Group with Vocal	Won	
Grammy Awards	1990	Savage	Best Music Video – Long Form	Nominated	
Grammy Awards	1991	We Two Are One Too	Best Music Video – Long Form	Nominated	
Grammy Awards	1993	Diva	Best Music Video – Long Form	Won	
Grammy Awards	1993	Diva	Album of the Year	Nominated	
Grammy Awards	1993	Diva	Best Female Pop Vocal Performance	Nominated	
Grammy Awards	1996	"No More 'I Love You's'"	Best Female Pop Vocal Performance	Won	
Grammy Awards	1996	Medusa	Best Pop Vocal Album	Nominated	
Grammy Awards	2004	Bare	Best Pop Vocal Album	Nominated	
Grammy Awards	2005	"Into the West"	Best Song Written for a Motion Picture, Television or Other Visual Media	Won	
Grammy Awards	2015	Nostalgia	Best Traditional Pop Vocal Album	Nominated	
Hungarian Music Awards	1993	Diva	Best Foreign Album	Won	
Hungarian Music Awards	1993	Diva	Best Foreign Video	Nominated	
International Dance Music Awards	2004	"A Thousand Beautiful Things"	Best Progressive/Trance Track	Nominated	
Ivor Novello Awards	1984	"Sweet Dreams (Are Made of This)"	The Best Pop Song	Nominated	
Ivor Novello Awards	1984	Eurythmics	Songwriters of the Year	Won	
Ivor Novello Awards	1987	Eurythmics	Songwriters of the Year	Won	
Ivor Novello Awards	1987	"It's Alright (Baby's Coming Back)"	Best Contemporary Song	Won	
Ivor Novello Awards	1987	"The Miracle of Love"	Best Song Musically & Lyrically	Nominated	
Ivor Novello Awards	1993	"Why"	Best Song Musically & Lyrically	Won	
Ivor Novello Awards	1993	"Why"	International Hit of the Year	Nominated	
Ivor Novello Awards	1994	"Little Bird"	Most Performed Work	Nominated	
Ivor Novello Awards	1996	"No More 'I Love You's'"	Most Performed Work	Nominated	
Ivor Novello Awards	1996	"No More 'I Love You's'"	Best Song Musically & Lyrically	Nominated	
Ivor Novello Awards	1996	"No More 'I Love You's'"	International Hit of the Year	Nominated	
Ivor Novello Awards	1998	"Step by Step"	Best Original Song for a Film or Broadcast	Nominated	
MTV Video Music Awards	1984	"Sweet Dreams (Are Made of This)"	Best New Artist	Won	
MTV Video Music Awards	1985	"Would I Lie to You?"	Best Stage Performance	Nominated	
MTV Video Music Awards	1985	"Would I Lie to You?"	Best Overall Performance	Nominated	
MTV Video Music Awards	1985	"Would I Lie to You?"	Best Choreography	Nominated	
MTV Video Music Awards	1985	"Would I Lie to You?"	Best Editing	Nominated	
MTV Video Music Awards	1985	"Would I Lie to You?"	Best Group Video	Nominated	
MTV Video Music Awards	1987	"Missionary Man"	Best Group Video	Nominated	
MTV Video Music Awards	1987	"Missionary Man"	Best Concept Video	Nominated	
MTV Video Music Awards	1987	"Missionary Man"	Most Experimental Video	Nominated	
MTV Video Music Awards	1987	"Missionary Man"	Best Special Effects	Nominated	
MTV Video Music Awards	1987	"Missionary Man"	Best Editing	Nominated	
MTV Video Music Awards	1988	"I Need a Man"	Best Group Video	Nominated	
MTV Video Music Awards	1988	"You Have Placed a Chill in My Heart"	Best Direction	Nominated	
MTV Video Music Awards	1989	"Put a Little Love in Your Heart"	Best Video from a Film	Nominated	
MTV Video Music Awards	1992	"Why"	International Viewer's Choice – MTV Europe	Nominated	
MTV Video Music Awards	1992	"Why"	Best Female Video	Won	
MTV Video Music Awards	1993	"Walking on Broken Glass"	Best Female Video	Nominated	
MTV Video Music Awards	1995	"No More 'I Love You's'"	Best Female Video	Nominated	
Pollstar Concert Industry Awards	1987	Revenge Tour	Small Hall Tour of the Year	Nominated	
Pollstar Concert Industry Awards	2005	Sacred Love Tour (with Sting)	Most Creative Tour Package	Nominated	
Rockbjörnen	1986	Eurythmics	Best Foreign Group	Won	
Rockbjörnen	1986	Revenge	Best Foreign Album	Won	

=== Honorary degrees and awards ===
Lennox has received a number of honorary degrees and awards, including;

- 1986 – Associate – Royal Academy of Music London
- 1997 – Fellowship – Royal Academy of Music London
- 2006 – Honorary Doctor of Music – The Royal Scottish Academy of Music and Drama
- 2006 – Fellowship – Edinburgh College of Art
- 2009 – Honorary Doctorate at the University of Edinburgh (awarded 20 October 2009), in recognition of her work in the field of HIV/AIDS, and her success as a recording artist.
- 2011 – Honoured by the university for her International Humanitarian Efforts – Glasgow Caledonian University
- 2012 – Honorary Degree – Open University of Scotland
- 2013 – Honorary Degree – Williams College
- 2013 – Honorary Doctorate in Music – Berklee College of Music
- 2013 – Honorary Degree – University of Essex

=== Other awards, titles and ambassadorships ===
Lennox has received a number of other awards, titles and ambassadorships throughout her career, including;

- 2002 – Billboard Century Award by Billboard
- 2008 – OUT magazine honoured Lennox for her work in the HIV and AIDS field. The top 100 most influential people in Gay Culture.
- 2008 – The British Red Cross Services to Humanity Award
- 2008 – Glamour magazine's Inspirational Woman of the Year Award
- 2008 – Honoured at the 2008 Youth AIDS Gala, for her contribution in helping the fight against HIV and AIDS
- 2008 – The German Sustainability "special achievement" award for her commitment in the fight against HIV and AIDS
- 2008 – Webby Award for official website www.annielennox.com
- 2009 – Save the Children "Amigo de los Niños" Award
- 2009 – Awarded the "Freedom of the City of London" by the British Red Cross for services to humanity in the field of HIV and AIDS
- 2009 – Nobel Peace Laureates for services to humanity
- 2010 – Patron of the Elton John AIDS Foundation
- 2010 – Special Envoy for HIV/AIDS in Scotland
- 2010 – Ambassador for HIV/AIDS in London
- 2010 – UNAIDS Goodwill Ambassador
- 2010 – Barclays Women of the Year Award
- 2010 – International Service Award for Global Defence of Human Rights
- 2010 – GQ Charity Woman of the Year Award
- 2010 – Harper's Bazaar Lifetime Achievement Award
- 2010 – Appointed an Officer of the Order of the British Empire (OBE) for her work fighting AIDS and poverty in Africa
- 2013 – Music Industry Trust Award (MITS) for her creativity and work that inspires those who work within the music business and millions of others worldwide
- 2016 – Elle Style Awards – Outstanding Achievement Award
- 2016 – Awarded Livingstone Medal by Royal Scottish Geographical Society
- 2016 – Harper's Bazaar Philanthropy Award
- 2020 – Songwriters Hall of Fame inductee (with Dave Stewart)
- 2022 – Rock and Roll Hall of Fame (Eurythmics)

== See also ==
- Annie Lennox; the recipient of the awards and nominations
- Eurythmics; of which Lennox was a member
