= Peacetour =

Video by Eurythmics
- Released: 20 June 2000
- Recorded: 6 December 1999
- Venues: London Docklands Arena; London, England
- Genre: Concert Performance Video
- Length: 96 mins
- Label: RCA (BMG)
- Director: David Barnard
- Producers: Mark Harry, Geoff Foulkes

Eurythmics chronology
| Greatest Hits (1991) | Peacetour (2000) | Ultimate Collection (2005) |

Peacetour is a live concert video by the British pop/rock duo Eurythmics released on 20 June 2000 on VHS and DVD. It is a recording of the band's concert at London Docklands Arena on 6 December 1999, which was the final show of their 24-date world "Peace Tour". All profits from the tour were donated to Amnesty International and Greenpeace.

The live concert features a selection of hits from Eurythmics' successful 1980s period, and several newer tracks from the band's comeback album Peace (1999). The 1985 album track "I Love You Like a Ball and Chain" is also performed, as well as two 1992 hits from Annie Lennox's solo career, "Why" and "Walking on Broken Glass".

The DVD version also includes several special features, such as multi-angle viewing for selected tracks (where the viewer can select different camera angles using the remote control), an interactive discography, a picture gallery, lyrics screens, and a 60-minute documentary ("Peacetalk") featuring interviews with bandmembers Annie Lennox and Dave Stewart and several studio-based performances of songs.

== Track listing ==
1. "I Want It All"
2. "Missionary Man"
3. "Thorn in My Side"
4. "When Tomorrow Comes"
5. "It's Alright (Baby's Coming Back)"
6. "I Saved the World Today"
7. "Who's That Girl?"
8. "I Love You Like a Ball and Chain"
9. "Would I Lie To You?"
10. "Sisters Are Doin' It for Themselves"
11. "17 Again"
12. "You Have Placed a Chill in My Heart"
13. "Love Is a Stranger"
14. "I Need a Man"
15. "Walking on Broken Glass"
16. "There Must Be an Angel (Playing with My Heart)"
17. "Here Comes the Rain Again"
18. "Why"
19. "The Miracle of Love"
20. "Peace Is Just a Word"
21. "Sweet Dreams (Are Made of This)"

== Personnel ==
- Annie Lennox (vocals)
- Dave Stewart (guitar)
- Steve Lewinson (bass/musical director)
- Pete Lewinson (drums)
- Joel Campbell (keyboards)
- Sam Flynn (keyboards)
- Beverley Skeete (backing vocals)
- Claudia Fontaine (backing vocals)
- Faye Simpson (backing vocals)
- Chris Davis (saxophone)

== Certifications ==
| Region | Certification | Certified units/sales |
|---|---|---|
| Australia (ARIA) | Gold | 7,500^{^} |
^{^} Shipments figures based on certification alone.
