= Live (Eurythmics video) =

Eurythmics Live

Video by Eurythmics
- Released: 11 December 1987
- Recorded: 14 February 1987
- Venues: Sydney Entertainment Centre; Sydney, Australia
- Genre: Concert Performance Video
- Length: 90 mins
- Label: PolyGram
- Director: Geoff Wonfor
- Producers: Oil Factory Films, Ltd.

Eurythmics chronology
Sweet Dreams: The Video Album (1983)	Eurythmics Live (1987)	Savage (1988)

Eurythmics Live is a live concert video by the British pop/rock duo Eurythmics, filmed during their Revenge Tour at Sydney Entertainment Centre in Sydney, Australia on 14 February 1987.

== Track listing ==
The intro and some segments in between songs feature the band filmed in a studio, including Patrick Seymour's keyboard intro to "Sweet Dreams (Are Made of This)" and Jimmy 'Z' Zavala's harmonica intro to "Missionary Man".

1. It Could Be the Future (spoken word prologue, shot in a studio)
2. "Sexcrime (1984)"
3. "Let's Go"
4. "The Last Time"
5. "Here Comes the Rain Again"
6. "It's Alright (Baby's Coming Back)"
7. "When Tomorrow Comes"
8. "There Must Be an Angel (Playing with My Heart)"
9. "Who's That Girl?"
10. "Right by Your Side"
11. "Thorn in My Side"
12. "Sweet Dreams (Are Made of This)"
13. "Would I Lie to You?" / "Day Tripper" (medley)
14. "Missionary Man"
15. "Sisters Are Doin' It for Themselves"
16. "The Miracle of Love"
17. End credits - "The Miracle of Love" (instrumental studio version)

The video omits the following songs that were performed during the concert:

- "I Love You Like a Ball and Chain" (originally performed after "Let's Go")
- "Conditioned Soul" (originally performed after "Who's That Girl?").

== Songs issued on records ==
- "Here Comes the Rain Again" was included on the CD single "You Have Placed a Chill in My Heart" (1988) and on the album Eurythmics Live 1983–1989 (1993), although the latter was edited to remove the first saxophone solo.
- "There Must Be an Angel (Playing with My Heart)" was included on the CD single for "Shame" (1987).
- "Missionary Man" was included on the CD single for "I Need a Man" (1988) and Eurythmics Live 1983–1989.
- "The Miracle of Love" was included on Eurythmics Live 1983–1989, though it was incorrectly credited as being recorded in Paris in September 1989. It was also slightly truncated, removing a short speech by Annie Lennox.

== Formats ==
- VHS Videotape
- LaserDisc
  - UK PAL
  - US NTSC
  - Japan NTSC
- DVD
  - Brazil (FanFasq label)
  - Argentina (Garra Media label, 2011)

== Personnel ==
- Annie Lennox -lead vocals and backing vocals
- Dave Stewart - guitars and backing vocals
- Patrick Seymour - synthesizers, electric grand piano and sampler
- Chucho Merchan - bass
- Jimmy 'Z' Zavala - saxophone and harmonica
- Joniece Jamison - backing vocals
- Clem Burke - drums, timpanis and drum machines
