= Live 1983–1989 =

Live album by Eurythmics

Live album by Eurythmics
- Released: 15 November 1993
- Recorded: March 1983 – October 1989
- Genres: Synth-pop; arena rock; soul
- Length: 106:27
- Label: RCA
- Producer: David A. Stewart

Eurythmics chronology
Greatest Hits (1991)	Live 1983–1989 (1993)	Peace (1999)

Live 1983–1989 is a compilation album of live performances by British pop duo Eurythmics, recorded throughout the 1980s, encompassing the years of their greatest commercial success. It was released in November 1993 by RCA Records.

The songs are presented chronologically across two discs, with most of the performances recorded close to the time of the original studio recording. For example, the performances of "Love Is a Stranger" and "Who's That Girl?", both from 1983 albums, are drawn from 1983 concerts and sound very similar to the studio versions.

Professional ratings
Review scores
Source	Rating
AllMusic	2/5 stars
Billboard	(favorable)
Calgary Herald	B
Music Week	4/5 stars
Select	1/5 medals

== Track listing ==
All songs written by Annie Lennox and David A. Stewart, except "When Tomorrow Comes", written by Lennox, Stewart and Patrick Seymour.

=== Disc one ===
No.	Title	Recorded	Length
1.	"Never Gonna Cry Again"	The Haçienda, Manchester; 3 March 1983	5:15
2.	"Love Is a Stranger"	Six Flags Magic Mountain, Los Angeles; 20 August 1983	4:01
3.	"Sweet Dreams (Are Made of This)"	Quartier Latin, Berlin; 22 March 1983	3:46
4.	"This City Never Sleeps"	Apollo, Manchester; 6 November 1983	5:38
5.	"Somebody Told Me"	The Buffalo, New York City; 1 April 1984	3:44
6.	"Who's That Girl?"	Auditorium Theatre, Chicago; 5 April 1984	4:08
7.	"Right by Your Side"	City Coliseum, Austin; 18 April 1984	4:27
8.	"Here Comes the Rain Again"	Johanneshovs Isstadion, Stockholm; 3 October 1986	5:51
9.	"Sexcrime (Nineteen Eighty-Four)"	Stadthalle, Fürth; 28 October 1986	3:47
10.	"I Love You Like a Ball and Chain"	Palazzo dello Sport, Rome; 27 October 1989	5:06
11.	"Would I Lie to You?"	Southern Star Amphitheater, Houston; 16 August 1986	3:35

=== Disc two ===
No.	Title	Recorded	Length
1.	"There Must Be an Angel (Playing with My Heart)"	Wembley Arena, London; December 1986	6:58
2.	"Thorn in My Side"	Brighton Centre, Brighton; 12 December 1986	4:35
3.	"Let's Go"	Town Hall, Christchurch; 24 January 1987	4:56
4.	"Missionary Man"	Entertainment Centre, Sydney; 14 February 1987	5:04
5.	"The Last Time"	Entertainment Centre, Melbourne; 7 March 1987	3:44
6.	"The Miracle of Love"	Entertainment Centre, Sydney; 14 February 1987	6:23
7.	"I Need a Man"	Palazzo dello Sport, Rome; 27 October 1989	4:00
8.	"We Two Are One"	Point Theatre, Dublin; 8 September 1989	4:20
9.	"(My My) Baby's Gonna Cry"	Playhouse, Edinburgh; 11 September 1989	5:11
10.	"Don't Ask Me Why"	Palazzo dello Sport, Rome; 27 October 1989	5:06
11.	"Angel"	Wembley Arena, London; 23 September 1989	6:08

=== Disc three ===
Limited edition bonus acoustic CD. All songs recorded live at Palazzo dello Sport in Rome, 27 October 1989.

No.	Title	Length
1.	"You Have Placed a Chill in My Heart"	3:59
2.	"Here Comes the Rain Again"	2:46
3.	"Would I Lie to You?"	2:05
4.	"It's Alright (Baby's Coming Back)"	1:30
5.	"Right by Your Side"	1:22
6.	"When Tomorrow Comes"	3:21

Notes

- "Would I Lie to You" abridged version that fades out at 3:35. Originally part of a medley that segued into a cover of the Beatles' "Day Tripper".
- "The Miracle of Love" is incorrectly credited as recorded in Paris, September 1989, though it was actually recorded in Sydney, Australia, on 14 February 1987 and was featured (in full) on the Eurythmics Live video release.

== Personnel ==
- Annie Lennox
- David A. Stewart

The musicians involved are as follows (though no indication is made of the recordings they appear on):

- Clem Burke – drums
- Dick Cuthell – brass
- Martin Dobson – brass
- Malcolm Duncan – brass
- Sarah Fisher – backing vocals
- Mickey Gallager – bass
- Dean Garcia – bass
- Joniece Jamison – backing vocals
- Victor Martin – drums
- Chucho Merchán – bass
- Gill O'Donovan – backing vocals
- Suzie O'List – backing vocals
- Pete Phipps – drums
- David Plews – brass
- Eddi Reader – backing vocals
- Olle Romo – drums
- Margaret Ryder – backing vocals
- Patrick Seymour – keyboards
- Jimmy 'Z' Zavala – saxophone, harmonica

== Charts ==
Chart performance for Live 1983–1989
Chart (1993–1994)	Peak position
Australian Albums (ARIA)	102
Austrian Albums (Ö3 Austria)	40
Dutch Albums (Album Top 100)	80
German Albums (Offizielle Top 100)	80
UK Albums (Official Charts)	22

Chart performance for Live 1983–1989 (1995 reissue)
Chart (1995)	Peak position
UK Albums (Official Charts)	51

== Certifications ==
Certifications for Live 1983–1989
Region	Certification	Certified units/sales
United Kingdom (BPI)	Gold	100,000^{^}
^{^} Shipments figures based on certification alone.
