= Boxed =

Boxed may refer to:

- Boxed.com, a wholesale on-line shopping site.
- Boxed (Eurythmics), an eight album box set
- Boxed (Mike Oldfield album)
- Boxed warning, a warning that appears on United States packaging
- Boxed (film), a 2019 thriller film
- Boxed type, in computer science
