= Laurence Stevens =

British artist

- Born: United Kingdom
- Occupations: Graphic designer; artist

Laurence Stevens is a British graphic designer who created sleeve designs and artworks for Eurythmics' and Annie Lennox's albums and singles. He was the original drummer for the English synth-pop band Blancmange.
