= Revenge (Eurythmics album) =

1986 studio album by Eurythmics

Studio album by Eurythmics
- Released: 30 June 1986
- Recorded: July 1985 – May 1986
- Studios: Conny's Studio (Cologne, West Germany); Studio de la Grande Armée (Paris, France)
- Genre: Pop rock
- Length: 43:44
- Label: RCA
- Producer: David A. Stewart

Eurythmics chronology
| Be Yourself Tonight (1985) | Revenge (1986) | Savage (1987) |

Singles from Revenge
- 1. "When Tomorrow Comes" Released: 2 June 1986 (UK); 2. "Missionary Man" Released: July 1986 (US); 3. "Thorn in My Side" Released: 26 August 1986; 4. "The Miracle of Love" Released: 17 November 1986

Professional ratings
Review scores
| Source | Rating |
|---|---|
| AllMusic | 3/5 stars |
| Robert Christgau | B+ |
| Los Angeles Times | Positive |
| Record Mirror | 3.5/5 stars |
| Rolling Stone | Unfavourable |
| Smash Hits | 8/10 |
| Sounds | 2/5 stars |

Revenge is the fifth studio album by the British pop duo Eurythmics, released on 30 June 1986 by RCA Records in the United Kingdom and on 14 July in the United States. Building on the sound of their previous album, Be Yourself Tonight (1985), Revenge saw the duo further embrace a more "rock band" style. The album spawned four singles and was a commercial success. The single "Missionary Man" won the 1987 Grammy Award for Best Rock Performance by a Duo or Group with Vocal. In the band's native UK, at the 1987 Brit Awards, Dave Stewart won the Brit Award for British Producer of the Year (his second of three awards in the category) and the band were nominated (for the third time) for the Brit Award for Best British Group.

The album's release was supported by an extensive world tour; a 1987 concert from the Australian leg of the tour was later released on home video as Eurythmics Live.

On 14 November 2005, Sony BMG released remastered versions of each of Eurythmics' eight studio albums, containing bonus tracks and remixes. The bonus track "Revenge 2" is a radically different remake of "Revenge", the closing track of the duo's 1981 debut album In the Garden. A line from the song ("She said revenge can be so sweet") is also heard at the end of "A Little of You".

== Track listing ==
All tracks are written by Annie Lennox and David A. Stewart, except "When Tomorrow Comes" co-written by Patrick Seymour, and "My Guy" by Smokey Robinson and Ronald White.

| No. | Title | Length |
|---|---|---|
| 1. | "Missionary Man" | 4:26 |
| 2. | "Thorn in My Side" | 4:13 |
| 3. | "When Tomorrow Comes" | 4:28 |
| 4. | "The Last Time" | 4:11 |
| 5. | "The Miracle of Love" | 5:05 |
| 6. | "Let's Go!" | 4:11 |
| 7. | "Take Your Pain Away" | 4:34 |
| 8. | "A Little of You" | 3:54 |
| 9. | "In This Town" | 3:42 |
| 10. | "I Remember You" | 5:00 |
| Total length: | | 43:44 |

2005 remastered CD bonus tracks
| No. | Title | Length |
|---|---|---|
| 11. | "When Tomorrow Comes" (extended version) | 6:36 |
| 12. | "Thorn in My Side" (extended version) | 6:54 |
| 13. | "Missionary Man" (extended version) | 6:50 |
| 14. | "When Tomorrow Comes" (live acoustic version) | 3:19 |
| 15. | "Revenge 2" | 5:40 |
| 16. | "My Guy" | 1:58 |
| Total length: | | 75:01 |

== Personnel ==
Credits adapted from the liner notes of Revenge.

=== Eurythmics ===
- Annie Lennox – vocals
- David A. Stewart – guitar (all tracks); vocals (tracks 4, 5, 9, 10)

=== Additional personnel ===
- Patrick Seymour – keyboards
- Clem Burke – drums
- Jimmy "Z" Zavala – harmonica (tracks 1, 2, 4, 6); saxophone (tracks 2, 3, 6, 9, 10)
- Jannick Top – bass guitar (tracks 1, 6)
- Joniece Jamison – backing vocals (tracks 1, 6, 7, 9)
- Michael Kamen – orchestra arrangement, conducting (tracks 1, 3, 5, 8, 10)
- John McKenzie – bass guitar (tracks 2, 3, 5, 7, 8)
- Bernita Turner – backing vocals (tracks 2, 9)
- Phil Chen – bass guitar (tracks 4, 10)
- Jon Bavin – additional keyboards (track 5)
- Gully – synthesiser guitar noise (track 5)

=== Technical ===
- David A. Stewart – production
- Jon Bavin – recording engineering, mixing engineering
- Manu Guiot – mixing engineering
- Fred Defaye – first assistant engineer
- Serge Pauchard – second assistant engineer

=== Artwork ===
- Eric Scott – sleeve paintings
- Laurence Stevens – sleeve designs

== Charts ==
=== Weekly charts ===
Weekly chart performance for Revenge
| Chart (1986–1987) | Peak position |
|---|---|
| Australian Albums (Kent Music Report) | 2 |
| Austrian Albums (Ö3 Austria) | 6 |
| Canada Top Albums/CDs (RPM) | 4 |
| Dutch Albums (Album Top 100) | 3 |
| European Albums (Music & Media) | 2 |
| Finnish Albums (Suomen virallinen lista) | 2 |
| French Albums (IFOP) | 12 |
| German Albums (Offizielle Top 100) | 5 |
| Icelandic Albums (Tónlist) | 2 |
| Italian Albums (Musica e dischi) | 10 |
| Japanese Albums (Oricon) | 46 |
| New Zealand Albums (RMNZ) | 1 |
| Norwegian Albums (VG-lista) | 1 |
| Swedish Albums (Sverigetopplistan) | 1 |
| Swiss Albums (Schweizer Hitparade) | 7 |
| UK Albums (Official Charts) | 3 |
| US Billboard 200 | 12 |

=== Year-end charts ===
1986 year-end chart performance for Revenge
| Chart (1986) | Position |
|---|---|
| Australian Albums (Kent Music Report) | 5 |
| Austrian Albums (Ö3 Austria) | 25 |
| Canada Top Albums/CDs (RPM) | 14 |
| Dutch Albums (Album Top 100) | 34 |
| European Albums (Music & Media) | 12 |
| German Albums (Offizielle Top 100) | 30 |
| New Zealand Albums (RMNZ) | 13 |
| Norwegian Autumn Period Albums (VG-lista) | 2 |
| Norwegian Summer Period Albums (VG-lista) | 1 |
| Swiss Albums (Schweizer Hitparade) | 11 |
| UK Albums (Gallup) | 10 |

1987 year-end chart performance for Revenge
| Chart (1987) | Position |
|---|---|
| Australian Albums (Kent Music Report) | 7 |
| European Albums (Music & Media) | 28 |
| New Zealand Albums (RMNZ) | 4 |
| UK Albums (Gallup) | 84 |

=== Decade-end charts ===
Decade-end chart performance for Revenge
| Chart (1980–1989) | Position |
|---|---|
| Australian Albums (Kent Music Report) | 13 |

== Certifications ==
Certifications for Revenge
| Region | Certification | Certified units/sales |
|---|---|---|
| Australia (ARIA) | 4× Platinum | 400,000 |
| Austria (IFPI Austria) | Gold | 25,000^{*} |
| Canada (Music Canada) | 2× Platinum | 200,000^{^} |
| Finland (Musiikkituottajat) | Platinum | 48,885 |
| Germany (BVMI) | Gold | 250,000^{^} |
| Italy (FIMI) | Gold | 100,000 |
| New Zealand (RMNZ) | 5× Platinum | 75,000^{^} |
| Norway (IFPI Norway) | Platinum | 100,000 |
| Spain (Promusicae) | Gold | 50,000^{^} |
| Switzerland (IFPI Switzerland) | Platinum | 50,000^{^} |
| United Kingdom (BPI) | 2× Platinum | 600,000^{^} |
| United States (RIAA) | Gold | 500,000^{^} |
^{*} Sales figures based on certification alone.^{^} Shipments figures based on certification alone.
