= Angel (Eurythmics song) =

1990 single by Eurythmics

Single by Eurythmics

from the album We Too Are One
- B-side: "Angel" (Choir Version)
- Released: 23 April 1990
- Recorded: December 1988
- Length: 5:14
- Label: RCA
- Songwriters: Annie Lennox; David A. Stewart
- Producers: David A. Stewart; Jimmy Iovine

Eurythmics singles chronology
"(My My) Baby's Gonna Cry" (1990)	"Angel" (1990)	"Love Is a Stranger" (second reissue) (1991)

Music video
- "Angel" on YouTube

"Angel" is a song by British pop duo Eurythmics from their seventh studio album, We Too Are One (1989). It was written by band members Annie Lennox and David A. Stewart and produced by Stewart and Jimmy Iovine. The song was released as the album's fourth UK single on 23 April 1990, and would be the duo's final single for almost a decade (discounting the re-release of two older singles the following year). It was also released as the second single from the album in the United States.

Lennox said in an interview at the time that the song was inspired by the death of her aunt, as she sings about a woman who has killed herself and now has "gone to meet her maker". The music video, directed by Sophie Muller, features the duo taking part in a seance and running through a burning house, and was not widely seen in the US (not shown at all on MTV) supposedly due to several scenes depicting the occult.

"Angel" peaked at number 23 on the UK Singles Chart, though failed to chart on the US Billboard Hot 100.

Lennox re-recorded the song in 1997 for the Diana, Princess of Wales: Tribute album.

== Track listings ==
- CD single
1. "Angel" (Album Version) – 5:13
2. "Missionary Man" (Acoustic) – 3:45
3. "Angel" (Choir Version) – 5:48
- 7-inch single

A. "Angel" (Album Version) – 5:13
B. "Angel" (Choir Version) – 5:48

- 12-inch single

A. "Angel" (Album Version) – 5:13
B1. "Missionary Man" (Acoustic) – 3:45
B2. "Angel" (Choir Version) – 5:48

== Charts ==
=== Weekly charts ===
Weekly chart performance for "Angel"
Chart (1990)	Peak position
Europe (Eurochart Hot 100 Singles)	53
Ireland (IRMA)	25
Italy Airplay (Music & Media)	7
UK Singles (OCC)	23
