= Be Yourself Tonight =

1985 studio album by Eurythmics

Studio album by Eurythmics
- Released: 29 April 1985
- Recorded: November 1984 – January 1985 in Paris, Detroit and Los Angeles
- Genres: New wave; soul; pop rock; synth-pop
- Length: 43:33
- Label: RCA
- Producer: David A. Stewart

Eurythmics chronology
1984 (For the Love of Big Brother) (1984)	Be Yourself Tonight (1985)	Revenge (1986)

Singles from Be Yourself Tonight
- 1. "Would I Lie to You?" Released: 9 April 1985; 2. "There Must Be an Angel (Playing with My Heart)" Released: 24 June 1985; 3. "Sisters Are Doin' It for Themselves" Released: 21 October 1985; 4. "It's Alright (Baby's Coming Back)" Released: 30 December 1985

Professional ratings
Review scores
Source	Rating
AllMusic	4/5 stars
The Encyclopedia of Popular Music	4/5 stars
Record Mirror	3/5 stars
The Rolling Stone Album Guide	4/5 stars
Smash Hits	7 1/2/10
The Village Voice	B+

Be Yourself Tonight is the fourth studio album by British pop duo Eurythmics, released on 29 April 1985 by RCA Records. It spawned four singles – "Would I Lie to You?", "There Must Be an Angel (Playing with My Heart)", "Sisters Are Doin' It for Themselves" (a duet with Aretha Franklin) and "It's Alright (Baby's Coming Back)". The album has been described as their most commercially successful album, and has been pitched as "one of the greatest pop and rock albums of the 1980s". A notable departure from both the musical composition and image of their previous albums, Be Yourself Tonight was widely regarded as an example of their finest work due to their continued "innovation" of their music.

It was a major commercial success for Eurythmics on international albums charts, reaching the top five in regions including Australia (where it reached number one), New Zealand, Norway, Sweden, Canada, Finland and the United Kingdom. Elsewhere, it reached the top ten in the United States, Switzerland and Germany.

It was nominated for the Billboard Music Award for Top Billboard 200 Album and Top Compact Disk Award at the 1985 Billboard Music Awards and the Brit Award for British Album of the Year at the 1986 Brit Awards. Two of the albums singles – "Sisters Are Doin' It for Themselves" and "Would I Lie to You?" were nominated for two awards at the 28th Annual Grammy Awards in 1986 for Best R&B Performance by a Duo or Group with Vocals and Best Rock Performance by a Duo or Group with Vocal respectively.

== Background ==
Largely recorded in Paris, with additional recording in Detroit and Los Angeles, this album saw Eurythmics move away from their previous more experimental, synthesizer-based songs, to a more pop/rock sound with some R&B elements. Songs, such as "Would I Lie To You?" were influenced by 1960s style music, as well as utilising American soul and British pop. Combining elements of Motown and rock music, the album incorporates a more traditional band line-up/instrumentation. Nonetheless, the recordings still possessed an atmospheric and cutting edge sound, winning David A. Stewart awards for his production work on the album.

The release of the album coincided with a new look for singer Annie Lennox, who ditched the androgynous look of the previous albums and became, in biographer Lucy O'Brien's words, "a bleach-blonde rock 'n' roller". Be Yourself Tonight includes guest appearances by notable artists such as Aretha Franklin, Stevie Wonder, and Elvis Costello. The album features a range of genres performed by the duo, many of which were performed by the band for the first time. It has been described as both a "masterpiece" and "one of the best pop/rock albums of the 1980s" largely in part a result of their "innovation and ability to not succumb to the machine”.

== Release and promotion ==
No tour followed the album's release, due to Lennox's recuperation from vocal fold nodules (which also caused her to have to miss 1985's Live Aid concert).

== Chart performance ==
Be Yourself Tonight reached the top 3 in the UK and top 10 in the US, as well as spawning several hit singles. The album includes the duo's first (and only) UK number-one "There Must Be an Angel (Playing with My Heart)". The first single released was "Would I Lie to You?". It would hit #5 on the Billboard Hot 100, #6 on the Cash Box Top 100 and also hit #1 in Australia. The album was certified double platinum by the British Phonographic Industry (BPI), indicating sales in excess of 600,000 copies, and Platinum by the Recording Industry Association of America (RIAA) for sales in excess of one million copies.

== Track listing ==
All tracks are written by Annie Lennox and David A. Stewart, except where noted.

No.	Title	Length
1.	"Would I Lie to You?"	4:25
2.	"There Must Be an Angel (Playing with My Heart)"	5:22
3.	"I Love You Like a Ball and Chain"	4:04
4.	"Sisters Are Doin' It for Themselves" (duet with Aretha Franklin)	5:54
5.	"Conditioned Soul"	4:30
6.	"Adrian" (duet with Elvis Costello)	4:29
7.	"It's Alright (Baby's Coming Back)"	3:45
8.	"Here Comes That Sinking Feeling"	5:40
9.	"Better to Have Lost in Love (Than Never to Have Loved at All)"	5:06
Total length:		43:15

2005 special edition bonus tracks
No.	Title	Writer(s)	Length
10.	"Grown Up Girls"		4:12
11.	"Tous les garçons et les filles"	Françoise Hardy; Roger Samyn	3:25
12.	"Sisters Are Doin' It for Themselves" (duet with Aretha Franklin) (ET Mix)		7:48
13.	"Would I Lie to You?" (Extended Mix)		4:59
14.	"Conditioned Soul" (Live)		5:07
15.	"Hello I Love You"	Jim Morrison; Robby Krieger; Ray Manzarek; John Densmore	2:50
Total length:			71:36

=== Notes ===
- Track 4 is edited to 5:22 on the 2018 vinyl remaster
- Track 9 is incorrectly labelled "Better to Have Lost in Love (Then Never to Have Loved at All)" on the 2005 remastered reissue.
- Track 13 of the 2005 remastered reissue is listed as the "ET Mix", but it is actually the "Extended Mix" from the "Would I Lie to You?" 12-inch single.
- The live version of "Conditioned Soul" (track 14) was recorded on 14 February 1987, not in 1985. It was captured during Eurythmics' Revenge Tour at the Sydney Entertainment Centre, and it's the same performance featured in their Eurythmics Live video. This was omitted from the final video release but remains part of the audio recording used for the bonus track.

== Personnel ==
Credits adapted from the liner notes of Be Yourself Tonight.

=== Eurythmics ===
- Annie Lennox – vocals (all tracks); keyboards (tracks 2–6, 8, 9); keyboard sequencers (track 7)
- David A. Stewart – guitars (tracks 1, 3, 4, 6–9); sequencers (tracks 1, 5, 7); keyboards (tracks 2–5, 8, 9); bass sequencer, drum computer program (track 3); electric guitar, slide guitar (track 5); six-stringed octave guitar (track 6)

=== Additional musicians ===
- Nathan East – bass (tracks 1, 4)
- Olle Romo – drums (tracks 1, 2, 5–9); wood stomping (track 3)
- Benmont Tench – organ (tracks 1, 4)
- Dave Plews – trumpet (tracks 1, 7)
- Martin Dobson – saxophones (tracks 1, 7)
- Dean Garcia – bass (tracks 2, 5–9); wood stomping (track 3)
- Michael Kamen – strings (tracks 2, 9); celeste (track 6); brass arrangement idea (track 7); keyboard solo, string parts (track 8)
- Stevie Wonder – harmonica (track 2)
- Angel Cross – backing vocals (track 2)
- The Charles Williams Singers – backing vocals (track 3); gospel choir (track 4)
- Adam Williams – drum computer program (track 3)
- Sadie (and other uncredited performers) – gravel stomping (track 3)
- Aretha Franklin – "super" vocals (track 4)
- Stan Lynch – drums (track 4)
- Mike Campbell – lead guitar (tracks 4, 6)
- Elvis Costello – harmony vocal (track 6)

=== Technical ===
- David A. Stewart – production, mixing
- Adam Williams – mixing (tracks 1–3, 5, 7, 9); engineering (tracks 2, 4–9)
- Don Smith – special help (track 1); engineering (tracks 2, 4); mixing (tracks 3, 4, 6, 8); additional engineering (track 6)
- Jay Willis – engineering assistance (tracks 2–4)
- Shelly Yakus – drum recording (track 4)
- Stephen Marcussen – mastering

=== Artwork ===
- Laurence Stevens – art, design
- Paul Fortune – photography

== Charts ==
=== Weekly charts ===
Weekly chart performance for Be Yourself Tonight
Chart (1985)	Peak position
Australian Albums (Kent Music Report)	1
Austrian Albums (Ö3 Austria)	25
Canada Top Albums/CDs (RPM)	3
Dutch Albums (Album Top 100)	3
European Albums (Eurotipsheet)	5
Finnish Albums (Suomen virallinen lista)	3
French Albums (IFOP)	20
German Albums (Offizielle Top 100)	8
Italian Albums (Musica e dischi)	18
Japanese Albums (Oricon)	44
New Zealand Albums (RMNZ)	2
Norwegian Albums (VG-lista)	2
Swedish Albums (Sverigetopplistan)	2
Swiss Albums (Schweizer Hitparade)	9
UK Albums (Official Charts)	3
US Billboard 200	9

=== Year-end charts ===
1985 year-end chart performance for Be Yourself Tonight
Chart (1985)	Position
Australian Albums (Kent Music Report)	5
Canada Top Albums/CDs (RPM)	17
Dutch Albums (Album Top 100)	16
European Albums (Eurotipsheet)	10
German Albums (Offizielle Top 100)	28
New Zealand Albums (RMNZ)	12
Norwegian Autumn Period Albums (VG-lista)	16
Norwegian Summer Period Albums (VG-lista)	6
UK Albums (Gallup)	15
US Billboard 200	54

1986 year-end chart performance for Be Yourself Tonight
Chart (1986)	Position
Australian Albums (Kent Music Report)	86
Dutch Albums (Album Top 100)	75
European Albums (Music & Media)	53
UK Albums (Gallup)	30

== Certifications and sales ==
Certifications and sales for Be Yourself Tonight
Region	Certification	Certified units/sales
Australia	—	150,000
Brazil	—	56,000
Canada (Music Canada)	2× Platinum	200,000^{^}
Finland (Musiikkituottajat)	Gold	27,170
France (SNEP)	Gold	100,000^{*}
Germany (BVMI)	Gold	250,000^{^}
New Zealand (RMNZ)	Platinum	15,000^{^}
Sweden (GLF)	2× Platinum	200,000^{^}
United Kingdom (BPI)	2× Platinum	600,000^{^}
United States (RIAA)	Platinum	1,000,000^{^}
^{*} Sales figures based on certification alone.^{^} Shipments figures based on certification alone.
