= Thorn in My Side =

1986 single by Eurythmics

Single by Eurythmics

from the album Revenge
- B-side: "When Tomorrow Comes" (live)
- Released: 26 August 1986
- Studio: Conny's studio (Cologne, Germany); Studio de la Grande Armée (Paris, France)
- Genre: Pop rock
- Length: 4:12
- Label: RCA
- Songwriters: Annie Lennox; David A. Stewart
- Producer: David A. Stewart

Eurythmics singles chronology
"Missionary Man" (1986)	"Thorn in My Side" (1986)	"The Miracle of Love" (1986)

Music video
- "Thorn in My Side" on YouTube

"Thorn in My Side" is a song by British pop music duo Eurythmics. It was released as the second single from the duo's fifth studio album, Revenge (1986). Written by band members Annie Lennox and David A. Stewart, the song is a cast-off to an unfaithful lover. "Thorn in My Side" was produced by Stewart.

== Background ==
Although the first single from Revenge, "When Tomorrow Comes", barely reached the UK top 30, "Thorn in My Side" became Eurythmics' ninth top-10 single, reaching number five on the UK Singles Chart and marking their last appearance in the UK top 10. In the United States, the track stalled at number 68 on the Billboard Hot 100. The song additionally peaked at number two in Ireland and reached the top 10 in New Zealand (number seven) and Sweden (number six).

== Reception ==
Billboard said it sounds like "Swinging London, 1964" although it "views the past with as much irony as affection." Cash Box called it an "appealing pop/rock single" in which the "seething lyrics are masked by an infectious melody and Annie Lennox’s winning vocal."

== Music video ==
The music video, directed by Chris Ashbrook and Dave Stewart, depicts the band adorned in their black and leather Revenge stage costumes, playing in a studio set bar filled with an audience that includes a gang of Hells Angels. Clem Burke, drummer from the band Blondie, appears in the video as he was recording and touring with Eurythmics that year. It was also the second music video to feature backing vocalist Joniece Jamison, after first appearing in "When Tomorrow Comes".

== Track listings ==
7-inch single

A. "Thorn in My Side" (album version) – 4:07
B. "When Tomorrow Comes" (live at the Roxy in Los Angeles) – 5:02

12-inch single

A1. "Thorn in My Side" (extended mix) – 6:54
B1. "Thorn in My Side" (album version) – 4:07
B2. "When Tomorrow Comes" (live at the Roxy in Los Angeles) – 5:02

12-inch single (Houston remix)

A1. "Thorn in My Side" (Houston remix) – 5:49
B1. "Thorn in My Side" (album version) – 4:07
B2. "In This Town" (live)

== Charts ==
=== Weekly charts ===
Weekly chart performance for "Thorn in My Side"
Chart (1986–1987)	Peak position
Australia (Kent Music Report)	12
Austria (Ö3 Austria Top 40)	14
Belgium (Ultratop 50 Flanders)	34
Canada Top Singles (RPM)	41
Europe (European Hot 100 Singles)	14
Finland (Suomen virallinen lista)	9
Ireland (IRMA)	2
New Zealand (Recorded Music NZ)	7
Spain (AFYVE)	13
Sweden (Sverigetopplistan)	6
UK Singles (Official Charts)	5
US Billboard Hot 100	68
US Cash Box Top 100	56
West Germany (GfK)	26

=== Year-end charts ===
Year-end chart performance for "Thorn in My Side"
Chart (1986)	Position
UK Singles (Gallup)	48

== Certifications ==
Certifications for "Thorn in My Side"
Region	Certification	Certified units/sales
New Zealand (RMNZ)	Gold	15,000^{‡}
United Kingdom (BPI)	Silver	200,000^{‡}
^{‡} Sales+streaming figures based on certification alone.
