= When Tomorrow Comes =

Single by Eurythmics

from the album Revenge
- B-side: "Take Your Pain Away" (Album Version)
- Released: 2 June 1986
- Recorded: September 1985
- Studio: Conny's Studio (Cologne, West Germany); Studio de la Grande Armée (Paris, France)
- Genre: Pop rock
- Length: 3:57 (promo version); 4:26 (single/album version)
- Label: RCA
- Songwriters: Annie Lennox; David A. Stewart; Pat Seymour
- Producer: David A. Stewart

Eurythmics singles chronology
"It's Alright (Baby's Coming Back)" (1985)	"When Tomorrow Comes" (1986)	"Missionary Man" (1986)

Music video
- "When Tomorrow Comes" on YouTube

"When Tomorrow Comes" is a song recorded by British pop music duo Eurythmics. It was written by group members Annie Lennox, David A. Stewart and guest keyboardist Pat Seymour. With this single and its parent album Revenge, Lennox and Stewart continued with the rock and R&B sound from their previous album Be Yourself Tonight.

Released as the lead single from the album, "When Tomorrow Comes" was a modest hit in the UK, only reaching the top 30. It proved to be a much bigger success in Australia and Scandinavia, where it reached the top 10. "When Tomorrow Comes" was not released as a single in the United States.

== Track listing ==
=== 7" single ===
- A: "When Tomorrow Comes" (album version) – 4:29
- B: "Take Your Pain Away" (album version) – 4:34

=== 12" single ===
- A: "When Tomorrow Comes" (extended version) – 6:37
- B1: "Take Your Pain Away" (album version) – 4:34
- B2: "When Tomorrow Comes" (orchestral version) – 4:28

== Charts ==
=== Weekly charts ===
Weekly chart performance for "When Tomorrow Comes"
Chart (1986)	Peak position
Australia (Kent Music Report)	7
Belgium (Ultratop 50 Flanders)	18
Europe (European Hot 100 Singles)	20
Finland (Suomen virallinen lista)	7
Ireland (IRMA)	13
Italy (Musica e dischi)	7
Netherlands (Dutch Top 40)	19
Netherlands (Single Top 100)	22
New Zealand (Recorded Music NZ)	19
Norway (VG-lista)	5
South Africa (Springbok Radio)	19
Spain (AFYVE)	12
Sweden (Sverigetopplistan)	4
UK Singles (Official Charts)	30
West Germany (GfK)	22

=== Year-end charts ===
Year-end chart performance for "When Tomorrow Comes"
Chart (1986)	Position
Australia (Kent Music Report)	51
