= Sisters Are Doin' It for Themselves =

1985 single by Eurythmics and Aretha Franklin

- Standard artwork

Single by Eurythmics and Aretha Franklin

from the album Be Yourself Tonight and Who's Zoomin' Who?
- B-side: "I Love You Like a Ball and Chain"
- Released: 21 October 1985
- Studio: United Sound Systems (Detroit, Michigan)
- Genre: Soul; R&B; electro
- Length: 5:52 (album version); 4:29 (single version)
- Label: RCA
- Songwriters: Annie Lennox; David A. Stewart
- Producer: David A. Stewart

Eurythmics singles chronology
"There Must Be an Angel (Playing with My Heart)" (1985)	"Sisters Are Doin' It for Themselves" (1985)	"It's Alright (Baby's Coming Back)" (1985)

Aretha Franklin singles chronology
"Who's Zoomin' Who" (1985)	"Sisters Are Doin' It for Themselves" (1985)	"Another Night" (1986)

Music video
- "Sisters Are Doin' It for Themselves" on YouTube

"Sisters Are Doin' It for Themselves" is a song by British pop duo Eurythmics and American singer Aretha Franklin. A modern feminist anthem, it was written by Eurythmics members Annie Lennox and David A. Stewart and featured on both Eurythmics' Be Yourself Tonight (1985) and Franklin's Who's Zoomin' Who? (1985) albums. The duo originally intended to perform with Tina Turner, who was unavailable at the time and so they flew to Detroit and recorded with Franklin instead. The track also features three of Tom Petty's Heartbreakers: Stan Lynch on drums, Benmont Tench on organ, and Mike Campbell on lead guitar, plus session bassist Nathan East.

== Reception ==
Released as a single by RCA Records in October 1985, "Sisters Are Doin' It for Themselves" was highly successful, reaching number 9 on the UK Singles Chart and number 18 on the US Billboard Hot 100. The song was nominated for a Grammy Award for Best R&B Performance by a Duo or Group with Vocals.

Cash Box said that the song is "a rousing, soulful tune with a driving R&B feel". Billboard said it has "two varieties of charisma plus a furious funk production". Spin wrote, "That this hard-driving feminist anthem works so wonderfully for both women is a testament to the talent of Lennox. Any lesser singer would have wilted and died in such company."

== Music video ==
This music video was taped at Detroit's Music Hall. The video is interspersed with clips from old black and white films, including 1962's A Kind of Loving. The video uses the single version of the song, as opposed to the album version.

== Track listings ==
7-inch

- A: "Sisters Are Doin' It for Themselves" (7-inch version) – 4:35
- B: "I Love You Like a Ball and Chain" (LP version) – 4:08

12-inch

- A1: "Sisters Are Doin' It for Themselves" (LP version) – 5:54
- B1: "Sisters Are Doin' It for Themselves" (ET mix) – 7:53
- B2: "I Love You Like a Ball and Chain" (LP version) – 4:08

== Credits ==
Eurythmics

- Annie Lennox – vocals, keyboards
- David A. Stewart – guitars, keyboards

Additional personnel

- Nathan East – bass guitar
- Stan Lynch – drums
- Mike Campbell – lead guitar
- Benmont Tench – organ
- Aretha Franklin – guest vocals
- The Charles Williams Singers – gospel choir

== Charts ==
Chart performance for "Sisters Are Doin' It for Themselves"
Chart (1985–1986)	Peak position
Australia (Kent Music Report)	15
Belgium (Ultratop 50 Flanders)	28
Canada Top Singles (RPM)	33
Europe (European Hot 100 Singles)	9
Finland (Suomen virallinen lista)	9
Ireland (IRMA)	5
Netherlands (Dutch Top 40)	20
Netherlands (Single Top 100)	17
New Zealand (Recorded Music NZ)	6
Switzerland (Schweizer Hitparade)	20
UK Singles (Official Charts)	9
US Billboard Hot 100	18
US Dance Club Songs (Billboard)	10
US Dance Singles Sales (Billboard)	21
US Hot R&B/Hip-Hop Songs (Billboard)	66
US Cash Box Top 100 Singles	22
US Top 100 Black Contemporary Singles (Cash Box)	57
West Germany (GfK)	22

== Certifications ==
Certifications for "Sisters Are Doin' It for Themselves"
Region	Certification	Certified units/sales
United Kingdom (BPI) Sales since 2004	Silver	200,000^{‡}
^{‡} Sales+streaming figures based on certification alone.

== Cover versions ==
- The song was performed by the cartoon character Lisa Simpson (as sung by actress Yeardley Smith) along with Lisa's aunts Patty and Selma Bouvier as well as Ann Wilson and Nancy Wilson of Heart on The Yellow Album released in 1998.
- In 2005, The Pointer Sisters recorded a cover version of the song with Belgian singer Natalia. The single was released only in Belgium in October 2005 and reached number two on the Belgian singles chart.
- The television show Xena: Warrior Princess featured a cover of the song by actress Lucy Lawless and Gillian Iliana Waters in the episode Lyre, Lyre, Hearts on Fire.
- The 2019 comedy series This Time With Alan Partridge featured a performance of the song by vocal harmony group 'The Quavers', featuring Steve Coogan's character Partridge himself. In typical Partridge clumsiness, this interpretation gives all the lead vocals to the males in the group while its three female members are relegated to the back row.

=== Live cover performances ===
- In 1986, Kylie Minogue with her sister Dannii Minogue performed this song on Young Talent Time.
- On 21 October 1991, the gothic rock band Rosetta Stone performed a live cover version of the song at the Leeds Warehouse. In 1992, a bootleg recording of the concert has been released as "Under the rose".
- In 1998, the Spice Girls performed a live cover version of the song on their Spiceworld Tour, as a duet between Melanie C (Sporty Spice) and Mel B (Scary Spice). They also performed it on TFI Friday.
- In 2011, Christina Aguilera, Martina McBride, Florence Welch, Jennifer Hudson & Yolanda Adams covered this song at 53rd Grammy Awards.
