= The Miracle of Love =

Single by Eurythmics

from the album Revenge
- B-side: "When Tomorrow Comes" (Live At the Roxy in Los Angeles)
- Released: 17 November 1986
- Recorded: November 1985
- Length: 5:05
- Label: RCA Records
- Songwriters: Annie Lennox, David A. Stewart
- Producer: David A. Stewart

Eurythmics singles chronology
"Thorn in My Side" (1986)	"The Miracle of Love" (1986)	"Beethoven (I Love to Listen To)" (1987)

Music video
- "Miracle of Love" on YouTube

"The Miracle of Love" is an electropop ballad recorded by British duo Eurythmics. It was written by Eurythmics members Annie Lennox and David A. Stewart and produced by Stewart. The track was released as the third single from the duo's sixth album Revenge in the UK. It was not released as a single in the United States.

The music video was directed by band member David A. Stewart. The grainy video shows Lennox and Stewart separately in darkened room surrounded only by candles followed by a shot of Lennox against a tree while historical footage of military violence is shown. The video ends with an extreme close-up of Lennox as she wanders around a park before acknowledging the camera by winking, smiling and laughing. The cover art for the single is a screenshot from this scene. The music features a soaring guitar solo by Stewart, reprising the melody of the opening bars.

The song became a modest hit on the UK Singles Chart but reached the top 20 in Australia, Brazil and parts of Europe. In a review of Revenge, Glenn O'Brian of Spin magazine called it "a miraculous love song that is heavenly, seductive, sweeping, anodynamic, and straightforwardly, blatantly healing."

== Track listing ==
=== 7" single ===
- A: "The Miracle of Love" – 5:05
- B: "When Tomorrow Comes" (Live at the Roxy in Los Angeles) – 5:08

=== 12" single ===
- A: "The Miracle of Love" – 5:05
- B1: "When Tomorrow Comes" (Live at the Roxy in Los Angeles) – 5:08
- B2 "Who's That Girl?" (Live on Rockline 21 July 1986) – 3:28*

*later released on the 2005 remaster of Touch

== Charts ==
Chart performance for "The Miracle of Love"
Chart (1986–1987)	Peak position
Australia (Kent Music Report)	14
Belgium (Ultratop 50 Flanders)	18
Europe (European Hot 100 Singles)	17
France (SNEP)	16
Ireland (IRMA)	10
Netherlands (Dutch Top 40)	31
Netherlands (Single Top 100)	43
New Zealand (Recorded Music NZ)	30
Spain (AFYVE)	2
Sweden (Sverigetopplistan)	18
Switzerland (Schweizer Hitparade)	21
UK Singles (OCC)	23
West Germany (GfK)	53
