= Here Comes the Rain Again =

Single by Eurythmics

from the album Touch
- B-side: "Paint a Rumour"
- Released: 13 January 1984
- Recorded: 1983
- Studio: The Church
- Genre: Synth-pop; synth-rock; new wave
- Length: 4:54 (album version); 5:05 (single version); 4:43 (video version); 3:50 (7" promo version)
- Label: RCA
- Songwriters: Annie Lennox; David A. Stewart
- Producer: David A. Stewart

Eurythmics singles chronology
"Right by Your Side" (1983)	"Here Comes the Rain Again" (1984)	"Sexcrime (Nineteen Eighty-Four)" (1984)

Music video
- "Here Comes the Rain Again" on YouTube

"Here Comes the Rain Again" is a song by British duo Eurythmics and the opening track from their third studio album, Touch (1983). It was written by group members Annie Lennox and David A. Stewart and produced by Stewart. The song was released on 13 January 1984 as the album's third single in the UK and in the United States as the first single.

It became Eurythmics' second top-ten US song, peaking at number four on the Billboard Hot 100. "Here Comes the Rain Again" reached number eight in the UK Singles Chart, becoming their fifth consecutive top-ten single in their home country.

== Song information ==
Stewart explained to Songfacts that creating a melancholy mood in his songs is something at which he excels. He said: "'Here Comes the Rain Again' is kind of a perfect one where it has a mixture of things, because I'm playing a b-minor, but then I change it to put a b-natural (sic – the song is in A minor) in, and so it kind of feels like that minor is suspended, or major. So it's kind of a weird course. And of course that starts the whole song, and the whole song was about that undecided thing, like here comes depression, or here comes that downward spiral. But then it goes, 'so talk to me like lovers do.' It's the wandering in and out of melancholy, a dark beauty that sort of is like the rose that's when it's darkest unfolding and bloodred just before the garden, dies. And capturing that in kind of oblique statements and sentiments."

Stewart also said he and Lennox wrote the song while staying at the Mayflower Hotel in New York City. It was an overcast day, and Stewart was playing "melancholy A minor-ish chords with the B note in it" on his Casio keyboard. Lennox came over, looked out the window at the gray skies and the New York skyline, and spontaneously sang, "Here comes the rain again". The duo worked out the rest of the song based on that mood.

The string arrangements by Michael Kamen were performed by members of the British Philharmonic Orchestra. Kamen was recommended to Stewart by his ex-wife, Pamela Wilkinson, who Stewart was visiting while parts of The Church Studios were being constructed. Due to the limited space in the studio, the players had to improvise by recording their parts in other parts of the facility. The cellists were positioned in a row in a corridor leading to a door and the violinists and violists were situated in the facility's kitchen and bathroom respectively. Various wires and microphones were installed throughout the facility and connected to a Soundcraft mixing console located at the top of a spiral staircase. The recording console, which was located in a small corridor The song was then mixed by blending the orchestral tracks on top of the original synthesized backing track, which comprised programmed drums and sequencers. Stewart also played some parts on a Gretsch Country Club guitar with a Bigsby tremolo arm.

The running time for "Here Comes the Rain Again" is in actuality about five minutes long and was edited on the Touch album (fading out at approximately four-and-a-half minutes). Although it was edited even further for its single and video release, many U.S. radio stations played the full-length version of it. The entire five-minute version did not appear on any Eurythmics album until the U.S. edition of Greatest Hits in 1991.

== Release and reception ==
During the week of 28 January 1984, Billboard announced that "Here Comes the Rain Again" was the second most added song to Hot 100 reporting stations in the United States. In the UK, the single became Eurythmics' fifth Top 10 hit, peaking at number eight. It was the duo's second top ten hit in the United States, peaking at number four in March 1984.

Cashbox said that "Lennox sounds familiarly sultry and wispy, while Dave Stewart’s minor-key composition is laced with pizzicato strings and chiming, open chord guitar work."

== Music video ==
The music video, featuring both Annie Lennox and Dave Stewart, was directed by Stewart, Jonathan Gershfield and Jon Roseman, and filmed in December 1983, a month before the single came out. The video opens with a passing aerial shot of the Old Man of Hoy on the Island of Hoy in the Orkney Islands before transitioning to Lennox walking along the rocky shore and cliff top. She later explores a derelict cottage while wearing a nightgown and holding a lantern. Stewart stalks her with a video camera. In many scenes the two are filmed separately, then superimposed into the same frame.

== Track listings ==
7" single

- A: "Here Comes the Rain Again" (7" edit) – 3:53 (U.S. release, 5:05)
- B: "Paint a Rumour" (Long Version) – 8:00

12" single

- A: "Here Comes the Rain Again" (Full Version)* – 5:05
- B1: "This City Never Sleeps" (Live Version, San Francisco '83) – 5:30
- B2: "Paint a Rumour" (Long Version)* – 8:00

* both (Versions) are longer than the ones found on the Touch album

Other versions

- "Here Comes the Rain Again" (Freemasons Vocal Mix) – 7:17 / (2009)
- "Here Comes the Rain Again" (Freemasons Radio Edit) – 4:41 / (2009)
- "Here Comes the Rain Again" (Disconet Extended Version) – 6:57 / (1984)
- "Here Comes The Rain Again" (Honey Cone) - 4:02 / 2024

== Charts ==
=== Weekly charts ===
Weekly chart performance for "Here Comes the Rain Again"
Chart (1984)	Peak position
Australia (Kent Music Report)	16
Belgium (Ultratop 50 Flanders)	15
Canada Top Singles (RPM)	8
Canada Adult Contemporary (RPM)	7
Finland (Suomen virallinen lista)	24
Ireland (IRMA)	8
Netherlands (Dutch Top 40 Tipparade)	4
Netherlands (Single Top 100)	33
New Zealand (Recorded Music NZ)	32
Norway (VG-lista)	10
Sweden (Sverigetopplistan)	20
Switzerland (Schweizer Hitparade)	19
UK Singles (Official Charts)	8
US Billboard Hot 100	4
US Adult Contemporary (Billboard)	6
US Dance Club Songs (Billboard)	4
US Mainstream Rock (Billboard)	8
US Cash Box Top 100 Singles	5
Venezuela (UPI)	1
West Germany (GfK)	14

=== Year-end charts ===
Year-end chart performance for "Here Comes the Rain Again"
Chart (1984)	Position
Canada Top Singles (RPM)	58
US Billboard Hot 100	38
US Dance Club Songs (Billboard)	35
US Cash Box Top 100 Singles	38

== Certifications ==
Certifications for "Here Comes the Rain Again"
Region	Certification	Certified units/sales
Canada (Music Canada)	Gold	50,000^{^}
New Zealand (RMNZ)	Gold	15,000^{‡}
United Kingdom (BPI)	Silver	250,000^{^}
^{^} Shipments figures based on certification alone.^{‡} Sales+streaming figures based on certification alone.

== Personnel ==
Eurythmics

- Annie Lennox – vocals, keyboards
- Dave Stewart – guitar, keyboards

Additional personnel

- Michael Kamen – conductor
- British Philharmonic Orchestra – strings

== Sampling and Covers ==
- The song's opening was used in the Belgium Dance act Oxy's 1992 single "The Feeling."
- George Nozuka sings the same note when he says "Talk to me" with a slight stutter on his hit single, "Talk to Me". Another hit by Nozuka, "Last Night", features a riff that is inspired by "Sweet Dreams".
- The lyrics of the chorus were interpolated in the 1995 song "Tragedy" by RZA from the Wu-Tang Clan.
- The lyrics "Walk with me, like lovers do/Talk to me, like lovers do" were used in Platinum Weird's song "Taking Chances" which incidentally, was co-written by Stewart. "Taking Chances" was later covered by Celine Dion and released as the title track of her 2007 album.
- The lyrics of the chorus were sampled in Jamaican singer's Nadirah X song "Here It Comes" in 2010 on her debut album Ink.
- Madonna sampled the song on her Sticky & Sweet Tour in 2008–2009 with her own song Rain as a video interlude.
- Honey Cone released a cover of "Here Comes the Rain Again" in 2024, their first single release in over 50 years.
