= Would I Lie to You? (Eurythmics song) =

1985 single by Eurythmics

Single by Eurythmics

from the album Be Yourself Tonight
- B-side: "Here Comes That Sinking Feeling"
- Released: 9 April 1985
- Genre: Rock; soul
- Length: 4:22
- Label: RCA
- Songwriters: Annie Lennox; David A. Stewart
- Producer: David A. Stewart

Eurythmics singles chronology
"Julia" (1985)	"Would I Lie to You?" (1985)	"There Must Be an Angel (Playing with My Heart)" (1985)

Music video
- "Would I Lie to You?" on YouTube

"Would I Lie to You?" is a song written and performed by British pop duo Eurythmics. Released on 9 April 1985 as the lead single from the band's fourth studio album, Be Yourself Tonight (1985), the song was the first by the duo to feature their change in musical direction from a predominantly synthpop style to rock and rhythm and blues. The song, and its accompanying album, featured a full backing band and relied less on electronic programming.

Lyrically, the song features Lennox confronting a cheating lover as she leaves him for good. This was conveyed in the music video for the single, in which actor Steven Bauer played the part of the boyfriend. The video was directed by Mary Lambert and was shown heavily on MTV. The front and back cover photos, and the inner cover art of the Be Yourself Tonight album are screenshots from the music video.

"Would I Lie to You?" is one of Eurythmics' most recognised tunes and continued the band's run of hit singles. In the UK, the song peaked at number 17, while it went to number five on the U.S. Billboard Hot 100, becoming their third and last Top 10 hit in the U.S. Furthermore, it is the duo's biggest hit in Australia, where it topped the Kent Music Report for two weeks.

The song served as the opening theme to the Canadian television series Border Security: Canada's Front Line.

== Composition ==
Stewart set out to make a song with a "killer R&B riff". He worked it out one morning while having breakfast with his acoustic guitar on his knee. At first, Annie Lennox was hesitant, as she felt it didn't fit their established sound.

Stewart said, "When we started putting it down the song had a lot of energy and inspired Annie to come up with the great lyric, 'Would I Lie To You" and a melody with very odd answering harmonies, 'Now, would I say something that wasn't true.' These harmonies are very unusual and Annie is a genius at working them out very quickly in her head. The song started to be a fusion between Stax type R&B and Eurythmics."

== Reception ==
Spin called it, "an onslaught of Kinks-type power chords, Stax horn sections, and frenzied jungle drums with Lennox's vocal riding effortlessly atop this stampede. The strength of the cut is so focused, you fear something's gotta give; glasses gotta shatter." Cash Box said that the "hard rocking early Kinks guitar and a pounding Motown drum beat forms the background for Annie Lennox's R&B lead vocal."

== Track listings ==
7-inch

A. "Would I Lie To You?" (7-inch version) – 4:09
B. "Here Comes That Sinking Feeling" (LP version)* – 5:40

12-inch

A1. "Would I Lie To You?" (E.T. mix) – 4:59
B1. "Would I Lie To You?" (extended version) – 4:52
B2. "Here Comes That Sinking Feeling" (LP version)* – 5:40

* This version, although labelled as "LP version", is an alternate mix of the song released on the album Be Yourself Tonight

== Personnel ==
- Annie Lennox – vocals
- David A. Stewart – guitars, sequencers
- Olle Romo – drums
- Nathan East – bass guitar
- Benmont Tench – organ
- Dave Plews – trumpet
- Martin Dobson – saxophones

== Charts ==
=== Weekly charts ===
Weekly chart performance for "Would I Lie to You?"
Chart (1985)	Peak position
Australia (Kent Music Report)	1
Belgium (Ultratop 50 Flanders)	10
Canada Top Singles (RPM)	5
Europe (European Top 100 Singles)	11
France (SNEP)	41
Ireland (IRMA)	10
Italy (Musica e dischi)	24
Netherlands (Dutch Top 40)	23
Netherlands (Single Top 100)	24
New Zealand (Recorded Music NZ)	5
Sweden (Sverigetopplistan)	10
Switzerland (Schweizer Hitparade)	21
UK Singles (Official Charts)	17
US Billboard Hot 100	5
US Dance Club Songs (Billboard)	5
US Dance Singles Sales (Billboard)	14
US Mainstream Rock (Billboard)	2
US Cash Box Top 100 Singles	6
West Germany (GfK)	34

=== Year-end charts ===
Year-end chart performance for "Would I Lie to You?"
Chart (1985)	Position
Australia (Kent Music Report)	10
Canada Top Singles (RPM)	45
New Zealand (Recorded Music NZ)	30
US Billboard Hot 100	70
US Cash Box Top 100 Singles	51
