= Missionary Man (song) =

1986 single by Eurythmics

Single by Eurythmics

from the album Revenge
- B-side: "The Last Time" (live)
- Released: July 1986
- Genre: Rock
- Length: 4:26
- Label: RCA
- Songwriters: Annie Lennox; David A. Stewart
- Producer: David A. Stewart

Eurythmics singles chronology
"When Tomorrow Comes" (1986)	"Missionary Man" (1986)	"Thorn in My Side" (1986)

Music video
- "Missionary Man" on YouTube

"Missionary Man" is a song by British pop duo Eurythmics from their fifth studio album, Revenge (1986). The song features Jimmy Zavala on harmonica and Joniece Jamison on backing vocals.

In the band's native United Kingdom, "Missionary Man" was the fourth single issued from the album and peaked at number 31 on the UK Singles Chart. It was more successful in the United States, where it was released as the first single from the album and peaked at number 14 on the Billboard Hot 100, becoming their last main US top-20 entry as of 2026. It also received extensive airplay on album rock radio, reaching number one on the Billboard Album Rock Tracks chart, giving Eurythmics their only number-one song on this chart. The single also peaked at number nine in Australia, where it served as the album's second single.

"Missionary Man" earned Eurythmics a 1986 Grammy Award for Best Rock Performance by a Duo or Group with Vocal. The video received heavy airplay on MTV and received five nominations at the 1987 MTV Video Music Awards.

== Background ==
Upon the single's July 1986 US release, the song was described as being inspired in part by Lennox's 1984–1985 marriage to devout Hare Krishna Radha Raman. When discussing the song's inspiration and meaning, Lennox stated "Obviously, there is a personal meaning in [Missionary Man] for me, because of my past history. But I also think that there are a great deal of people in the media, in the form of politicians or religious speakers or philosophical people, people who are generally trying to have some power over other people, who I just don't trust."

== Music video ==
Directed by Willy Smax, the music video for "Missionary Man" features stop-animation techniques similar to those used in Peter Gabriel's "Sledgehammer" video from earlier in 1986. The video received heavy play from MTV and received five nominations at the 1987 MTV Video Music Awards.

== Track listings ==
- UK 7-inch single

A. "Missionary Man" (7-inch version) – 3:50
B. "The Last Time" (live at The Roxy in Los Angeles)

- UK 12-inch single

A. "Missionary Man" (extended version) – 6:55
B. "The Last Time" (live at The Roxy in Los Angeles)

- US 7-inch single

A. "Missionary Man" (7-inch version) – 3:50
B. "Take Your Pain Away" (LP version) – 4:37

- US 12-inch single

A. "Missionary Man" (extended version) – 6:55
B. "Take Your Pain Away" (LP version) – 4:37

== Charts ==
=== Weekly charts ===
Weekly chart performance for "Missionary Man"
Chart (1986–1987)	Peak position
Australia (Kent Music Report)	9
Belgium (Ultratop 50 Flanders)	34
Canada Top Singles (RPM)	13
Europe (European Hot 100 Singles)	78
Ireland (IRMA)	13
Netherlands (Single Top 100)	77
New Zealand (Recorded Music NZ)	12
UK Singles (Official Charts)	31
US Billboard Hot 100	14
US Dance Club Songs (Billboard)	6
US Dance Singles Sales (Billboard)	18
US Mainstream Rock (Billboard)	1
US Cash Box Top 100	15

=== Year-end charts ===
Year-end chart performance for "Missionary Man"
Chart (1986)	Position
Canada Top Singles (RPM)	93

== Release history ==
Release dates and formats for "Missionary Man"
Region	Date	Format(s)	Label(s)	Ref.
United States	July 1986	7-inch vinyl; 12-inch vinyl	RCA	
Japan	5 November 1986	12-inch vinyl	RCA	
United Kingdom	16 February 1987	7-inch vinyl; 12-inch vinyl	RCA	

== Cover versions ==
- The song was recorded by Swedish rock band Ghost on their 2016 EP Popestar.
