= Eurythmics =

British new wave duo

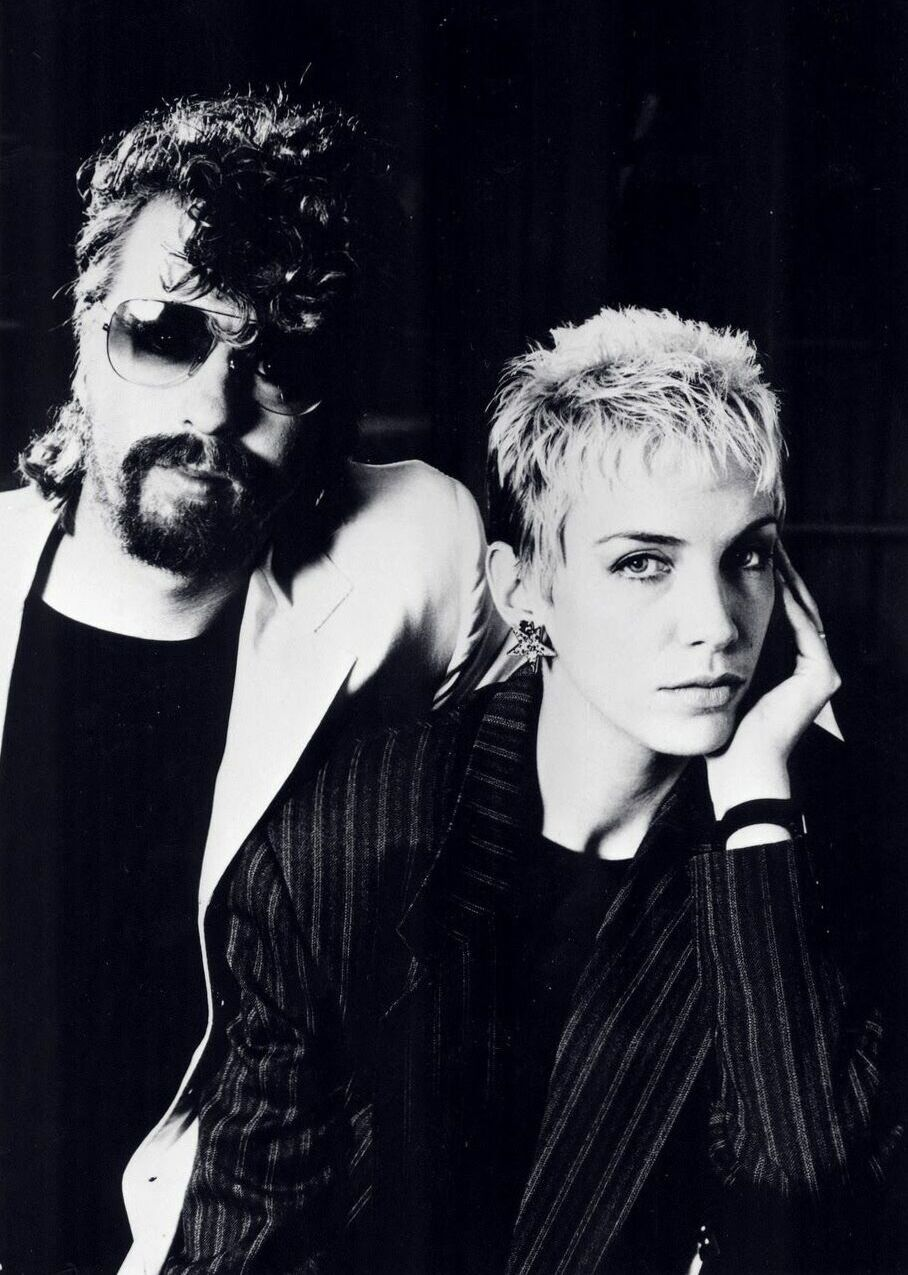
- Eurythmics, featuring Dave Stewart (left) and Annie Lennox (right), in 1985

Background information
- Origin: London, England
- Genres: New wave; synth-pop; soul; R&B
- Years active: 1980–1990; 1999–2005; 2014; 2019; 2022
- Labels: Arista; RCA; Sony BMG
- Spinoff of: The Tourists
- Past members: Annie Lennox; Dave Stewart
- Website: eurythmics.com

Eurythmics were a British new wave duo formed in 1980, consisting of the Scottish vocalist Annie Lennox and the English musician and producer Dave Stewart. They had both previously been in the Tourists, a band that broke up in 1980. They released their first album, In the Garden, in 1981 to little success, but achieved global acclaim with their second album, Sweet Dreams (Are Made of This) (1983). The title track became a worldwide hit, reaching number 2 in the UK Singles Chart, and number 1 in Canada and on the US Billboard Hot 100. Eurythmics went on to release a string of hit singles and albums, including "Love Is a Stranger", "There Must Be an Angel (Playing with My Heart)" and "Here Comes the Rain Again", before splitting in 1990.

Stewart became a sought-after record producer, while Lennox began a solo recording career in 1992 with her debut album Diva. After almost a decade apart, Eurythmics reunited to record their ninth album, Peace, released 1999. The album produced three singles – "I Saved the World Today", "17 Again" and "Peace Is Just a Word". The same year, they were awarded the Brit Award for Outstanding Contribution to Music. They reunited again in 2005 to release the single "I've Got a Life", which peaked within the top ten on the singles charts in Scotland, and reaching number one on the US Dance Club Songs Charts, as part of a new compilation album, Ultimate Collection.

Eurythmics have sold an estimated 75 million records worldwide. Their awards include the MTV Video Music Award for Best New Artist in 1984, the Grammy Award for Best Rock Performance by a Duo or Group with Vocal in 1987, and the Brit Award for Outstanding Contribution to Music in 1999. They were inducted into the UK Music Hall of Fame in 2005, the Songwriters Hall of Fame in 2020, and the Rock and Roll Hall of Fame in 2022.

== History ==
=== 1976–1982: Formation and In the Garden ===
Lennox and Stewart met in 1975 in a restaurant in London, where Lennox worked at that time. They first played together in 1976 in the punk rock band the Catch. After releasing one single as the Catch in 1977, the band evolved into the Tourists. Stewart and Lennox were also romantically involved. The Tourists achieved some commercial success, but the experience was reportedly an unhappy one. Personal and musical tensions existed within the group, whose main songwriter was Peet Coombes, and legal wrangling happened with the band's management, publishers and record labels. Lennox and Stewart felt the fixed band line-up was an inadequate vehicle to explore their experimental creative leanings and decided their next project should be much more flexible and free from artistic compromise. They were interested in creating pop music, but wanted freedom to experiment with electronics and the avant-garde.

It was in a hotel in Wagga Wagga, Australia, while playing around with a portable mini-synthesizer that Lennox and Stewart decided to become a duo. Calling themselves Eurythmics (after the pedagogical exercise system that Lennox had encountered as a child), they decided to keep themselves as the only permanent members and songwriters, and involve others in the collaboration "on the basis of mutual compatibility and availability". The duo signed to RCA Records. At this time, Lennox and Stewart also split as a couple. During the period that Lennox and Stewart were in the Tourists, and later as Eurythmics, they were managed by Kenny Smith and Sandra Turnbull of Hyper Kinetics Ltd.

They recorded their first album, In the Garden, in Cologne with Conny Plank (who had produced the later Tourists sessions). The album, released in October 1981, mixed psychedelic, krautrock and electropop influences, and featured contributions from Holger Czukay and Jaki Liebezeit (of Can), drummer Clem Burke (of Blondie), Robert Görl (of D.A.F.), and flautist Tim Wheater. A couple of the songs were co-written by guitarist Roger Pomphrey (later a TV director). The album was not a commercial success (though the debut single "Never Gonna Cry Again" made the UK charts at No. 63). Lennox and Stewart then activated their new Eurythmics mode of operation by touring the record as a duo, accompanied by backing tracks and electronics, carted around the country by themselves in a horse-box.

During 1982, the duo retreated to Chalk Farm in London and used a bank loan to establish a small eight-track studio above a picture framing factory, giving them freedom to record without having to pay expensive studio fees. They began to employ much more electronics in their music, collaborating with Raynard Faulkner and Adam Williams, recording many tracks in the studio and playing live using various line-up permutations. However, the three new singles they released that year ("This Is the House", "The Walk" and "Love Is a Stranger") all performed badly on initial release in the UK. Although their mode of operation had given them the creative freedom they desired, commercial success still eluded them and the responsibility of personally running so many of their affairs (down to transporting their own stage equipment) took its toll. Lennox apparently suffered at least one nervous breakdown during this period, while Stewart was hospitalised with a collapsed lung.

=== 1983–1984: Sweet Dreams (Are Made of This) and Touch ===
MTV has paved the way for a host of invaders from abroad: Def Leppard, Adam Ant, Madness, Eurythmics, the Fixx and Billy Idol, to name a few. In return, grateful Brits, even superstars like Pete Townshend and the Police, have mugged for MTV promo spots and made the phrase "I want my MTV" a household commonplace.

— Anglomania: The Second British Invasion, by Parke Puterbaugh for Rolling Stone, November 1983.

Eurythmics' commercial breakthrough came with their second album, Sweet Dreams (Are Made of This), released in January 1983. The successful title track featured a dark and powerful sequenced synth bass line and a dramatic video that introduced the now orange crew-cut Lennox to audiences. The song reached No. 2 on the UK Singles Chart, becoming one of the year's biggest sellers, No. 6 in Australia, and later topped the Canadian chart and US Billboard Hot 100. The band's fortunes changed immensely from this moment on, and Lennox quickly became a pop icon, gracing the covers of numerous magazines including Rolling Stone. Their previous single, "Love Is a Stranger", was also re-released and became another chart success. The video for the song saw Lennox in many different character guises, a concept she would employ in various subsequent videos. The album's working title was Invisible Hands (as was a track left off the album), inspiring the name of the British independent company Invisible Hands Music— known for releasing music by Hugh Cornwell, Mick Karn and Hazel O'Connor. The album also featured a cover of the 1968 Sam & Dave hit "Wrap It Up", performed as a duet between Lennox and Green Gartside of Scritti Politti.

The duo quickly recorded a follow-up album, Touch, which was released in November 1983. It became the duo's first No. 1 album in the UK, and also spawned three major hit singles. "Who's That Girl?" was a top 3 hit in the UK, the video depicting Lennox as both a blonde chanteuse and as an Elvis Presley clone. It also featured cameo appearances by Hazel O'Connor, Bananarama (including Stewart's future wife, Siobhan Fahey), Kate Garner of Haysi Fantayzee, Thereza Bazar of Dollar, Jay Aston and Cheryl Baker of Bucks Fizz, Kiki Dee, Jacquie O'Sullivan and the gender-bending pop singer Marilyn, who would go on to musical success of his own that same year. The upbeat, calypso-flavoured "Right by Your Side" made the Top 10, and "Here Comes the Rain Again" (No. 8 in the UK, No. 4 in the US) was an orchestral/synth ballad (with orchestrations by Michael Kamen).

In 1984, RCA released Touch Dance, an EP of remixes of four of the tracks from Touch, aimed at the club market. The remixes were by prominent New York City producers Francois Kevorkian and John "Jellybean" Benitez. Also released in 1984 was Eurythmics' soundtrack album 1984 (For the Love of Big Brother). Virgin Films had contracted the band to provide a soundtrack for Michael Radford's modern film adaptation of George Orwell's Nineteen Eighty-Four. However, Radford later said that the music had been "foisted" on his film against his wishes, and that Virgin had replaced most of Dominic Muldowney's original orchestral score with the Eurythmics soundtrack (including the song "Julia", which was heard during the end credits). Nevertheless, the record was presented as "music derived from the original score of Eurythmics for the Michael Radford film version of Orwell's 1984". Eurythmics charged that they had been misled by the film's producers as well, and the album was withdrawn from the market for a period while matters were litigated. The album's first single, "Sexcrime (Nineteen Eighty-Four)", was a top 5 hit in the UK, Australia and across Europe, and a major dance success in the United States.

=== 1985–1986: Be Yourself Tonight and new musical direction ===
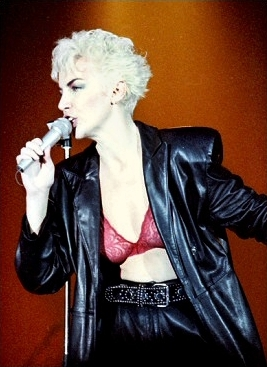
Annie Lennox performing during Revenge Tour in 1986

The duo's next album, Be Yourself Tonight, was produced in a week in Paris and spent four weeks at No. 1 in Australia. It showcased much more of a "band style" and a centred sound (with an R&B influence), with real drums, brass, and much more guitar from Stewart. Almost a dozen other musicians were enlisted, including members of Tom Petty's Heartbreakers, guest harmonica from Stevie Wonder, bass guitar from Dean Garcia, string arrangements by Michael Kamen, and Lennox singing duets with Aretha Franklin and Elvis Costello. It continued the duo's transatlantic chart domination in 1985, and contained four hit singles: "Would I Lie to You?" was a US Billboard top five hit and Australian No. 1, while "There Must Be an Angel (Playing with My Heart)" (featuring Wonder's harmonica contribution) became their first and only UK No. 1 single. The feminist anthem "Sisters Are Doin' It for Themselves" (a duet with Aretha Franklin, though originally intended for Tina Turner), and "It's Alright (Baby's Coming Back)" also rode high in the charts. In September 1985, Eurythmics performed "Would I Lie to You?" at the 1985 MTV Video Music Awards at the Radio City Music Hall in New York.

It was a major commercial success for Eurythmics on international albums charts, reaching the top five in regions including Australia (where it reached number one), New Zealand, Norway, Sweden, Canada, Finland and the United Kingdom. Elsewhere, it reached the top ten in the United States, Switzerland and Germany.

It was nominated for the Billboard Music Award for Top Billboard 200 Album and Top Compact Disk Award at the 1985 Billboard Music Awards and the Brit Award for British Album of the Year at the 1986 Brit Awards. Two of the albums singles – "Sisters Are Doin' It for Themselves" and "Would I Lie to You?" were nominated for two awards at the 28th Annual Grammy Awards in 1986 for Best R&B Performance by a Duo or Group with Vocals and Best Rock Performance by a Duo or Group with Vocal respectively.

=== 1986–1990: Revenge, Savage and We Too Are One ===
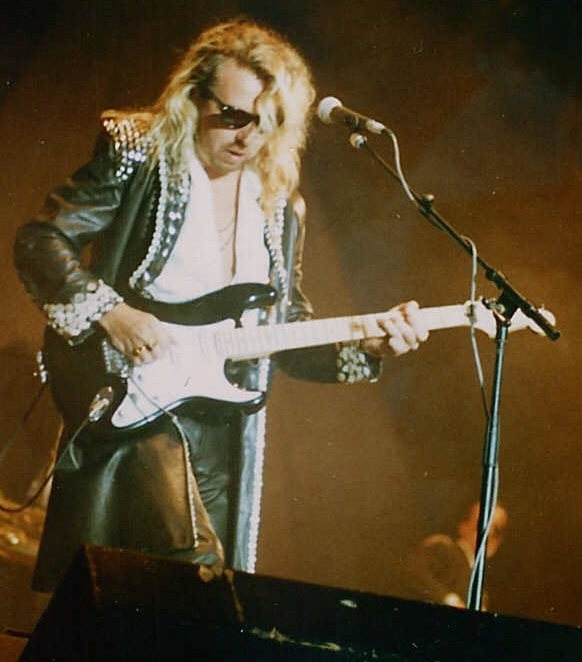
Dave Stewart at Rock am Ring in West Germany, 1987.

Eurythmics released their next album, Revenge, in 1986. The album continued their move towards a band sound, verging on an AOR-pop/rock sound. Sales continued to be strong in the UK and internationally, but were somewhat slower in the US, though "Missionary Man" reached No. 14 on the US Hot 100 chart and went all the way to No. 1 on the US Album Oriented Rock chart (AOR). Revenge would eventually certify double Platinum in the UK and Gold in the US, and spend forty weeks in the Australian Top 10 where it reached No. 2. The band went on a massive worldwide tour in support of the album, and a live concert video from the Australian leg of the tour was released.

In 1987, Lennox and Stewart released the album Savage. This saw a fairly radical change within the group's sound, being based mainly around programmed samples and drum loops (Lennox would later say that where Revenge was more of a Stewart album in sound, Savage was more of a Lennox one). Lyrically the songs showed an even darker, more obsessive side to Lennox's writing. A video album was also made, directed by Sophie Muller, with a video for each song. This was largely a concept piece, following characters portrayed by Lennox, specifically one of a frustrated housewife-turned-vamp (as exemplified in "Beethoven (I Love to Listen To)", a UK top 30 and Australian No. 13 hit). The brazen, sexually charged rocker "I Need a Man" remains a Eurythmics staple, as does "You Have Placed a Chill in My Heart". Much less commercial than the two previous albums, Savage was mostly ignored in the US, although rock radio in more progressive markets supported "I Need a Man". In the duo's native UK, however, the album was a top 10 success and was certified Platinum.

In 1989, Eurythmics released the album We Too Are One, which entered the UK Album Chart at No. 1 (their second No. 1 album after Touch) and gave the duo four UK Top 30 hit singles. The album was a return to the rock/pop sound of their mid-80s albums and was certified Double Platinum in the UK, and reached No. 7 in Australia, but was less successful in the US (although the single "Don't Ask Me Why" grazed the Billboard Top 40). Other singles from the album included "Revival", "The King and Queen of America" and "Angel". Accompanying the album, the duo conducted their Revival world tour from 8 September 1989 to 25 January 1990. Parts of the tour (both on and off-stage) were interspersed with promo videos for Eurythmics' 1990 video album We Two Are One Too.

=== 1990–1998: Hiatus and solo careers ===
After strenuous years of touring and recording (Eurythmics had released eight studio albums in eight years), a rift had developed between the duo and Eurythmics disbanded, although no formal notice was given. Stewart began writing film soundtracks and had a big international hit in 1990 with the instrumental track "Lily Was Here" (featuring saxophonist Candy Dulfer). The single reached No. 6 in the UK and the Top 20 throughout much of Europe and the US, and top 10 in Australia. A soundtrack of the same name was also released, produced and largely written by Stewart. He formed a band called the Spiritual Cowboys, releasing two albums with this group in the early 1990s. Lennox took time off from her career to have a baby and to consider a life after Eurythmics. Accordingly, the duo had very little communication with each other from 1991 to 1998. In 1991, Eurythmics' Greatest Hits collection was released, entering the UK album chart at No. 1 and spending a total of ten weeks at that position, plus eight weeks in New Zealand and seven weeks in Australia at No. 1 as well as becoming a massive worldwide seller. New remixes of "Sweet Dreams" and "Love Is a Stranger" were also released as singles at this time. During 1993, a live album entitled Live 1983–1989 featuring recordings from various years throughout Eurythmics' career was also released.

In 1992, Lennox released her first solo album, Diva. The album was a critical and popular success, entering the UK album chart at No. 1 and achieving quadruple platinum status (more than any Eurythmics studio album had done), as well as producing a string of five hit singles. She followed this up in 1995 with her second album, Medusa, an album of cover versions. It became her second No. 1 album in the UK, reaching double platinum status both there and in the US.

Stewart, meanwhile, released the solo albums Greetings from the Gutter (1995), and Sly-Fi (1998), but neither was commercially successful.

=== 1999–2005: Peace and Ultimate Collection ===
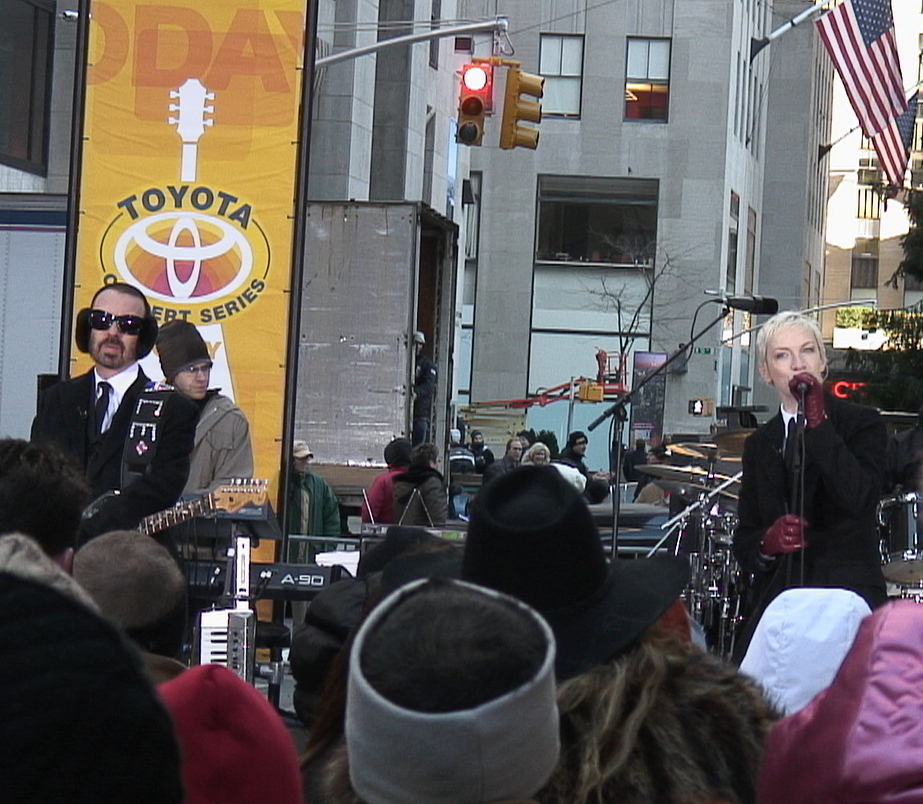
Stewart and Lennox performing on The Today Show in November 2005

In the late 1990s, Eurythmics reunited and recorded a new album, Peace, which was released in 1999. The single "I Saved the World Today" reached No. 11 in the UK Singles Chart, and a remix of "17 Again" gave the duo their first chart-topper on the US Hot Dance Music/Club Play chart. The band also embarked on a world tour, dubbed the "Peacetour", to support the album. The tour started on 18 September 1999 at Cologne's Kölnarena and ended on 6 December 1999 at the London Docklands Arena (which was filmed and released on video and DVD). All proceeds from the tour went to Greenpeace and Amnesty International. The year 2000 saw numerous European festival appearances by Eurythmics (at Germany's Rock am Ring, among others). In 2001, Stewart performed with U2 for the America: A Tribute to Heroes benefit concert. In 2002, he collaborated with Bryan Ferry on his album Frantic.

In June 2003, Lennox released her third solo album, Bare, which was a top-five hit in the UK and the US., with three tracks reaching the top of the US Billboard Hot Dance Music/Club Play chart. She also recorded the song "Into the West" for Peter Jackson's film The Lord of the Rings: The Return of the King, where it appeared as the closing theme and earned Lennox the Academy Award for Best Song. In November 2003, Eurythmics played three songs at the 46664 in Cape Town, South Africa, for which Stewart was one of the primary organisers. They played an unplugged version of "Here Comes the Rain Again", "7 Seconds" with Youssou N'Dour and "Sweet Dreams". Stewart collaborated with Rolling Stones vocalist Mick Jagger on the soundtrack to the movie Alfie, released in 2004, including the critically acclaimed "Old Habits Die Hard", which won a Golden Globe Award for Best Original Song from a Motion Picture.

On 7 November 2005, Eurythmics released Ultimate Collection, a remastered greatest hits package with two new songs. One of them, "I've Got a Life", was released as a single and reached No. 14 on the UK Singles Chart as well as spending three consecutive weeks at No. 1 on Billboard's Hot Dance Music/Club Play in the US. Lennox and Stewart appeared on a number of TV shows to promote their new compilation album, which was a Top 5 hit and certified Platinum in the UK. On 14 November 2005, the duo's label, RCA, re-released their eight studio albums in remastered and expanded editions featuring rare B-sides, remixes and unreleased songs. The remasters were made available separately with expanded artwork, and also together in a collector's box set, entitled Boxed. However, the 1984 soundtrack album 1984 (For the Love of Big Brother) was not included in this re-release campaign as Virgin Records holds the rights to that album. Also in 2005, Eurythmics were inducted into the UK Music Hall of Fame. In 2007, Lennox resumed her solo career with her fourth album, Songs of Mass Destruction, which was a top 10 success in the UK and the US. In 2009, she released her first solo "greatest hits" package, The Annie Lennox Collection. The same year, Lennox stated that although she and Stewart remain friends, she does not foresee any further Eurythmics projects in the future.

=== One–off reunions (2012–present) ===
In an interview with Reuters in September 2012, Stewart was quizzed on whether a new Eurythmics album is in the works, to which he replied: "We're not talking about one right now, but never say never." He added that he was considering developing a musical based on the music of Eurythmics.

==== 2014: Beatles tribute concert ====
Annie Lennox and Dave Stewart performed as a duo for "The Night That Changed America: A Grammy Salute to the Beatles". The event was recorded at the Los Angeles Convention Center on 27 January 2014, the day after the Grammy Awards. They performed the Beatles song "The Fool on the Hill".

==== 2019: Sting's 30th We'll Be Together benefit concert ====
Annie Lennox and Dave Stewart, billed as Eurythmics, performed at Sting's 30th We'll Be Together benefit concert in aid of his Rainforest Foundation Fund on 9 December 2019 at New York City's Beacon Theatre. The group played "Would I Lie to You?", "Here Comes the Rain Again", and "Sweet Dreams (Are Made of This)", before returning to join in the finale performance of Journey's "Don't Stop Believin'" along with the night's other performers.

==== 2022: Rock and Roll Hall of Fame induction ceremony ====
Annie Lennox and Dave Stewart performed as Eurythmics at the Microsoft Theater in Los Angeles, California performing "Would I Lie to You?", "Missionary Man" and "Sweet Dreams (Are Made of This)" as part of the 2022 Rock and Roll Hall of Fame induction ceremony. They were inducted by U2's the Edge.

== Discography ==
Studio albums

- In the Garden (1981)
- Sweet Dreams (Are Made of This) (1983)
- Touch (1983)
- Be Yourself Tonight (1985)
- Revenge (1986)
- Savage (1987)
- We Too Are One (1989)
- Peace (1999)

Soundtracks

- 1984 (For the Love of Big Brother) (1984)

== Concert tours ==
- Sweet Dreams Tour (1983)
- Touch Tour (1983–1984)
- Revenge Tour (1986–1987)
- Revival Tour (1989–1990)
- Peace Tour (1999)

== Awards ==
Billboard Music Awards

Year	Nominee / work	Award	Result	Ref.
1983	"Sweet Dreams (Are Made of This)"	Top Hot 100 Song	Nominated	
1984	Themselves	Top Disco Artist – Duo/Group	Nominated	
1985	Themselves	Top Artist	Nominated	
1985	Themselves	Top Billboard 200 Artist	Nominated	
1985	Themselves	Top Hot 100 Artist	Nominated	
1985	Themselves	Top Hot 100 Artist – Duo/Group	Nominated	
1985	Themselves	Top Dance Club Play Artist	Nominated	
1985	Be Yourself Tonight	Top Billboard 200 Album	Nominated	
1985	Be Yourself Tonight	Top Compact Disk	Nominated	
1985	"Would I Lie to You?"	Top Hot 100 Song	Nominated	
1985	"Sexcrime"	Top Dance Play Single	Nominated	
1986	Themselves	Top Billboard 200 Artist	Nominated	
1986	Themselves	Top Hot 100 Artist	Nominated	

Brit Awards

Year	Nominee / work	Award	Result
1984	Themselves	Best British Group	Nominated
1986	Be Yourself Tonight	Best British Album	Nominated
1986	Themselves	Best British Group	Nominated
1987	Themselves	Best British Group	Nominated
1990	Themselves	Best British Group	Nominated
1990	We Too Are One	Best British Album	Nominated
1990	"Don't Ask Me Why"	Best British Video	Nominated
1999	Themselves	Outstanding Contribution to British Music	Won
2010	"There Must Be an Angel"	Live Performance of 30 Years	Nominated

Grammy Awards

Year	Nominee / work	Award	Result
1984	Themselves	Best New Artist	Nominated
1985	Eurythmics Sweet Dreams: The Video Album	Best Video Album	Nominated
1986	"Sisters Are Doin' It for Themselves" (with Aretha Franklin)	Best R&B Performance by a Duo or Group with Vocal	Nominated
1986	"Would I Lie to You?"	Best Rock Performance by a Duo or Group with Vocal	Nominated
1987	"Missionary Man"	Best Rock Performance by a Duo or Group with Vocal	Won
1990	Savage	Best Music Video – Long Form	Nominated
1991	We Two Are One Too	Best Music Video – Long Form	Nominated

MTV Video Music Awards

Year	Nominee / work	Award	Result
1984	"Sweet Dreams (Are Made of This)"	Best New Artist	Won
1985	"Would I Lie to You?"	Best Stage Performance	Nominated
1985	"Would I Lie to You?"	Best Overall Performance	Nominated
1985	"Would I Lie to You?"	Best Choreography	Nominated
1985	"Would I Lie to You?"	Best Editing	Nominated
1985	"Would I Lie to You?"	Best Group Video	Nominated
1987	"Missionary Man"	Best Group Video	Nominated
1987	"Missionary Man"	Best Concept Video	Nominated
1987	"Missionary Man"	Most Experimental Video	Nominated
1987	"Missionary Man"	Best Special Effects	Nominated
1987	"Missionary Man"	Best Editing	Nominated
1988	"I Need a Man"	Best Group Video	Nominated
1988	"You Have Placed a Chill in My Heart"	Best Direction	Nominated

Music & Media Year-End Awards

Year	Nominee / work	Award	Result	Ref.
1987	Themselves	Group of the Year	Won	

- 1984: Ivor Novello Award – Songwriters of the Year
- 1987: Ivor Novello Award – Songwriters of the Year
- 1987: Ivor Novello Award – Best Contemporary Song for "It's Alright (Baby's Coming Back)"
- 2000: Silver Clef Award
- 2000: ASCAP Award for "Sweet Dreams (Are Made of This)"
- 2003: Kindred Spirit Music Award
- 2005: Inducted into UK Music Hall of Fame
- 2008: ASCAP Award for "Sweet Dreams (Are Made of This)"
- 2009: ASCAP Award for "Sweet Dreams (Are Made of This)"
- 2010: ASCAP Award for "Sweet Dreams (Are Made of This)"
