= Winston Smith (Nineteen Eighty-Four) =

Protagonist of 1949 novel by George Orwell

- Nineteen Eighty-Four character
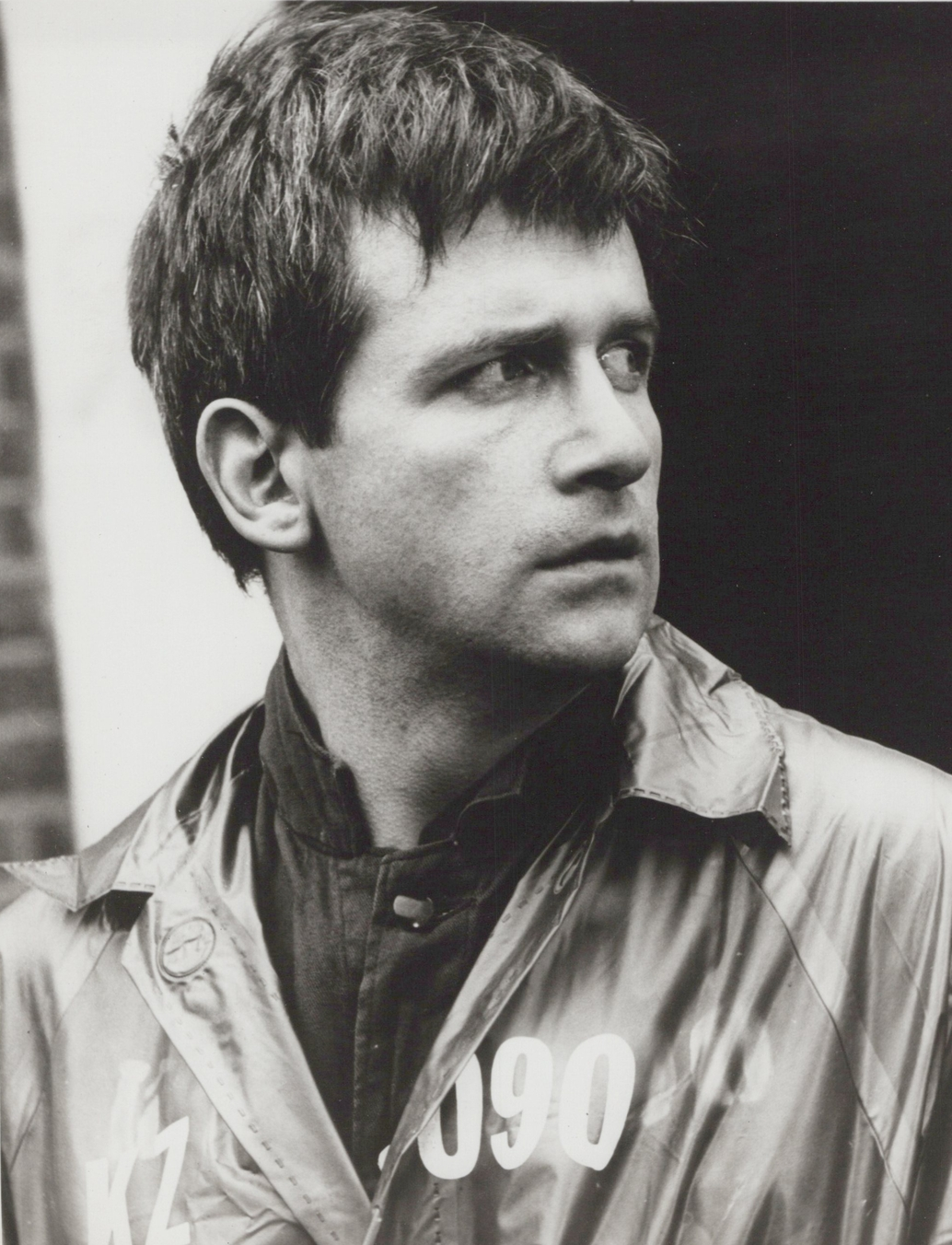
- David Buck as Winston Smith in a 1965 BBC TV adaptation
- First appearance: Nineteen Eighty-Four (1949)
- Created by: George Orwell
- Portrayed by: Eddie Albert (1953); Peter Cushing (1954); Edmond O'Brien (1956); John Hurt (1984)
- Voiced by: David Niven (1949); Richard Widmark (1953); Vincent Price (1955); Patrick Troughton (1965); Gary Watson (1967); Christopher Eccleston (2013); Matt Smith (2021); Andrew Garfield (2024)

In-universe information
- Occupation: Clerk in the Records Department of the Ministry of Truth
- Affiliation: Outer Party; The Brotherhood
- Spouse: Katharine
- Significant other: Julia
- Nationality: Oceanian

Winston Smith is a fictional character and the protagonist of George Orwell's dystopian 1949 novel Nineteen Eighty-Four. He was employed by Orwell as an everyman character. He is an unremarkable individual who questions the novel's oppressive regime and secretly rebels against its edicts, but is ultimately crushed into conformity.

Winston exists under a brutal, oppressive regime in Oceania, a totalitarian super-state. He works in the Ministry of Truth, rectifying historical documents for the Party, which is led by Big Brother. In defiance of the Party's directives, he begins to have revolutionary ideas, making him guilty of thoughtcrime. He takes further risk by beginning a forbidden secret affair with Julia, a fellow worker. The affair is eventually discovered and they are arrested by the Thought Police.

Smith has been described by critics as one of the most unconventional and compelling protagonists. He has been portrayed in numerous adaptations of the novel in film, television, radio and theatre, including Peter Cushing in the 1954 television adaptation and John Hurt in the 1984 film.

== Role in Nineteen Eighty-Four ==
Winston Smith works in the Records Department of the Ministry of Truth, where his job is to revise historical documents so they match the continually shifting party line. He revises newspaper articles and doctors photographs—mostly to remove "unpersons", people who have fallen afoul of the Party and thus effectively ceased to have ever existed. Due to his proximity to the mechanics of rewriting history, Smith nurses doubts about the Party and its monopoly on truth.

Winston meets a mysterious woman named Julia, a fellow member of the Outer Party who also bears resentment toward the party's ways; the two become lovers. Winston encounters O'Brien, a member of the Inner Party who Winston believes is secretly a member of The Brotherhood, a resistance organisation dedicated to overthrowing the Party's dictatorship. Believing they have met a kindred spirit, Winston and Julia meet him privately and are given The Theory and Practice of Oligarchical Collectivism, a book written by Emmanuel Goldstein – the leader of the Brotherhood and principal enemy of the state of Oceania – under the requirement that only after they have read it will they be full-fledged members of the Brotherhood.

O'Brien is really an agent of the Thought Police, which had Winston under surveillance. Winston and Julia are captured and imprisoned in the Ministry of Love, but Winston remains defiant and endures several months of extreme torture at O'Brien's hands. His spirit finally breaks when he is taken into Room 101 and confronted by his worst fear: the horror of being eaten alive by rats. He denounces Julia and pledges his loyalty to the Party. Any possibility of resistance or independent thought is destroyed when he is forced to accept that 2 + 2 = 5. By the end of the novel, Winston has been converted to an obedient, unquestioning party member who loves Big Brother.

== Characteristics ==
Winston exists under a brutal regime that demands complete loyalty to its leader Big Brother and controls its population by promoting fear and hatred. He lives under the threat of constant surveillance, language distortion and the rewriting of historical fact. Within a depressing, decaying London, the principal city of Airstrip One, his home is a dilapidated apartment building named Victory Mansions that contrasts with the enormous white concrete structures of the four ministries. His personal privacy is constantly invaded by the telescreen in his apartment, which transmits Party information but is also a tool of surveillance, giving him a persistent sense of anxiety.

Winston is an unconventional and flawed antihero. He is 39 years old and has various health conditions including varicose veins and false teeth. He has a violent recurring cough that leaves him gasping for air. He is tortured by the possibility that he betrayed his mother and sister as a child but hardly remembers his father. Orwell had also barely known his father, as he had only reappeared in his life in 1912. Winston has misogynist views about women. After noticing Julia, he imagines beating her with a rubber truncheon in a moment of hatred. Rob Hastings wrote in The Guardian that Winston's characterisation is compelling. He is small and frail, unattractive and self-pitying. His response to Julia's interest in him is self-aware: "I'm thirty-nine years old. I've got a wife that I can't get rid of. I've got varicose veins. I've got five false teeth." He later asks, "What could you see to attract you in a man like me?" Hastings noted that this characterisation was necessary for the purposes of expressing repression within Orwell's political writing.

Orwell illustrates that Winston is nostalgic. He buys a diary for no conscious reason other than for its physical appeal due to its marbled cover, a type not produced for forty years, and obtains a fountain pen purely because he likes the feeling of writing with a nib. Due to amnesia he has only fleeting memories of his past life. He knows that he was born in 1944 or 1945. He remembers significant events, including an air raid, an atomic bomb dropped on Colchester and several wars. He recalls being in a crowded tube station with his mother and younger sister. His fractured perspective of his life eventually leads to a midlife crisis. Winston is prone to thoughtcrime and defies the ruling Party by buying an old notebook and beginning a diary where he writes the inflammatory words "DOWN WITH BIG BROTHER", an act he knows will result in punishment by death. Tom Shippey highlighted the significance of Winston writing a diary. Its function is to record the past but also gives Winston physical evidence that past events took place, although its author struggles to write. Material objects such as a glass paperweight, photographs and the song "Oranges and lemons" provide further fragments of a forgotten past.

Working in the Records Department of the Ministry of Truth, he regularly rectifies documents in line with Party propaganda and destroys evidence via a memory hole. Feeling utterly alone in his recognition of the Party's contradictions, he questions his own memories and is astonished when noticing that the Hate Week speaker publicly changes the enemy of Oceania from Eurasia to Eastasia in mid sentence without anyone questioning it. James Connors noted the disparity between his commitment to his work and his secret hatred for the Party. Orwell writes that Winston's "greatest pleasure in life was his work" and that he is so skilled that "on occasion he had even been entrusted with the rectification of the Times leading articles". In addition, Winston is untroubled by the fact that every word he murmurs or writes in his work is a lie.

Winston's thoughtcrime leads him to further rebel against the Party's directives by engaging in a clandestine affair with Julia. Murray Sperber commented that Orwell directs the reader's view of Oceania through Winston's closed point of view but manipulates both Winston and the reader into expecting a hopeful ending. O'Brien reveals that Winston has in reality been under close surveillance by the Thought Police for seven years.

Winston's deep fear of rats is exploited by his tormentor O'Brien in Room 101 when he threatens to release a cage of ravenous rats on Winston to devour his face. D. J. Taylor wrote that this scene was characteristic of Orwell, by presenting Winston as a vulnerable human faced with vicious animal intelligence. Orwell studied rats throughout his life and his preoccupation with them recurs throughout his writing. Taylor noted that he would have gained knowledge of the ancient Chinese torture method of releasing rats onto victims while he was in the East.

== Themes ==
=== Destruction of objective truth ===
Orwell was preoccupied with the idea that "the very concept of objective truth is fading out of the world", having witnessed that during the Spanish Civil War historical accuracy had been made impossible due to propaganda. In the novel, Winston's work at the ironically-named Ministry of Truth involves rectifying historical documents in line with the Party's directives. The result of this revisionism is that Oceania's history is infinitely changeable so that objective truth no longer exists. Winston is even uncertain whether the events he records in his diary take place in the year 1984. One of Winston's tasks is to erase an Inner Party member who has become an "unperson" named Comrade Withers and replace him with a fake story about a war hero who never existed. In doing this, Winston is changing the past, which makes the Party infallible. Orwell recognised that history could be inaccurate and biased but wrote in his 1942 essay Looking Back on the Spanish War that the abandonment of historical truth could offer "a nightmare world in which the Leader, or some ruling clique, controls not only the future but the past. If the Leader says of such and such an event, ‘It never happened’ – well, it never happened. If he says that two and two are five – well, two and two are five."

=== Love as rebellion ===
Winston's struggle against the Party was considered by Gorman Beauchamp to be a re-enactment of Adam's disobedience against God, as embodied in the state, and a representation of the psychological battle between the individual and society proposed by Sigmund Freud. The figurehead of Big Brother is the subject of adoration whereby the individual exclaims "I love Big Brother". Winston begins to rebel through his hatred of Big Brother. The Party's abolishment of recreational sex ensures that no love exists except for love of the leader. Beauchamp comments that Winston's affair with Julia is comparable with Eve luring him to sin against God. Winston's love for Julia is itself a rebellion and must be destroyed by the Party. Orwell writes that their lovemaking is "a blow struck against the Party. It was a political act". Winston initially believes that the state cannot destroy their love because it is impenetrable but is eventually shown the contrary during his torture. When asked by O'Brien if there is anything left of his humanity that has not been degraded, Winston replies "I have not betrayed Julia". O'Brien understands that Winston can only love Big Brother completely once his love for Julia has been extinguished. Winston finally betrays her under torture by shouting "Do it to Julia!". After his release, Winston feels no love for her, signifying the end of his disobedience.

=== Struggle of self ===
Lillian Feder wrote that the novel charts Winston's progression from awareness through to resistance, impulse, and finally a rejection of self. Winston attempts to make sense of his past through his feelings, memories and dreams. He risks writing "Down with Big Brother" as an expression of his own sanity and seeks physical evidence of the past at a junk shop owned by Charrington. His affair with Julia is a final expression of self. When Winston is tortured, O'Brien explains, "It is impossible to see reality except by looking through the eyes of the Party. That is the fact that you have got to relearn, Winston. It needs an act of self-destruction, an effort of the will. You must humble yourself before you can become sane." O'Brien pursues a psychological battle for Winston's identity until rational thought is denied and his self destroyed. Winston mistakenly believes that he can continue to rebel privately but he eventually betrays Julia in Room 101, thereby illustrating the conditioning power of the totalitarian state. Following Winston's torture, he frequents the Chestnut Tree Cafe as a drunk and almost unconsciously writes the illogical expression 2 + 2 = 5 in the dust, which denotes his full conversion. Winston's story arc is a warning against the banning of independent thought. Edmond van Den Bossche writes of Winston "another cog is placed in the machinery of the State".

== Biographical context ==
Orwell's political ideas had been developing since the Spanish Civil War. He had volunteered in 1937 to fight against General Francisco Franco for the Republicans. While fighting in the POUM, a small Spanish communist party that opposed Stalin, Barcelona fell under control of the Stalinists and he was forced to flee for his life, giving him a personal experience of a police state. His six months in Spain caused him to start believing in socialism and generated a lasting hatred for totalitarianism. Additionally, Orwell gathered knowledge about life in the Soviet Union under Stalin and Germany under Hitler in the 1930s and 40s from accounts that he read in articles and pamphlets. Elements of these regimes, including a cult of personality, forced confessions, repressed speech and the rewriting of historical fact, later underlined the narrative of Nineteen Eighty-Four. His only experience of imprisonment had occurred in London in 1931 when he orchestrated his own arrest for drunkenness, which was echoed in his description of Winston's incarceration in the Ministry of Love. In his 1946 essay titled "Why I Write", he stated, "Every line of serious work that I have written since 1936 has been written, directly or indirectly, against totalitarianism and for democratic socialism, as I understand it."

By 1938, Orwell's health was failing due to being diagnosed with a lesion on his left lung causing him to spend three months in a sanatorium. His friends attributed his despondency about the future on his health, but Orwell later claimed that he had predicted a catastrophic future in 1931 and knew since 1936 that England would be at war with Germany. This despondency was highlighted by Dorian Lynskey as a "ghastly sensation of individual helplessness" recurring in his characters, including in Burmese Days, A Clergyman's Daughter, Keep the Aspidistra Flying and Coming Up for Air. Lynskey wrote: "His typical protagonist is a plain, mediocre individual who finds their role in society intolerable, attempts to resist or escape, and ends up back where they began, minus the hope that a better life is possible."

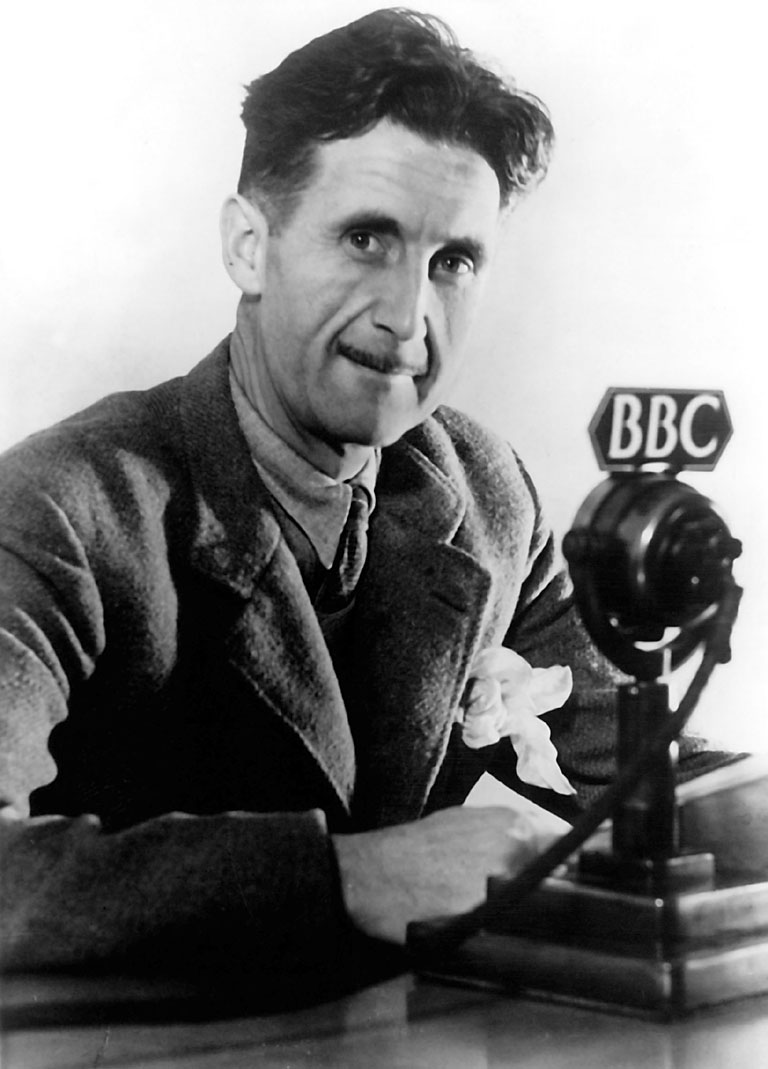
Orwell at the BBC

From the summer of 1941 to the autumn of 1943 Orwell worked as a "talks assistant" or producer for the BBC, which he described as "something halfway between a girls' school and a lunatic asylum". He was employed by its Eastern Service and produced commentaries on the news broadcast to India and the Far East. The work was often mundane and the daily schedule impacted on his damaged respiratory system, forcing him to take several leaves of absence. Orwell told his friend Tosco Fyvel that the work was tedious and the programmes were low quality. D. J. Taylor, a biographer of Orwell, considered this period in Orwell's life to be the origin of Nineteen Eighty Four's conception. Orwell was deeply frustrated working in the Corporation offices at 200 Oxford Street. His work at the BBC contained elements of propaganda, which he believed to be morally justified. Taylor noted that this was ironic: "he was a propagandist for a regime at war with another regime - and in that surely we see the roots of Nineteen Eighty-Four." Orwell reputedly took inspiration from rooms at the BBC, basing the canteen in the Ministry of Truth on the canteen at Bush House and Room 101, the torture chamber in the novel, on a room at Broadcasting House at Portland Place where he attended tedious meetings. Orwell resigned from the BBC stating that he was wasting his time as his broadcasts were not influencing the intended Indian audience. Critics have commonly cited Broadcasting House as a model for the Ministry of Truth and Newspeak as a reflection of the BBC's bureaucratic language. Journalist Mark Lawson considered Orwell's broadcasting experience to be influential on his creation of Winston, as a character who resists the persuasive language of the state.

The concept for the novel began to take shape around 1943 to 1944, when he and his first wife, Eileen, adopted their son Richard Blair. Orwell was influenced by the Tehran Conference, being of the conviction that the Allied leaders, Joseph Stalin, Winston Churchill and Franklin D. Roosevelt were planning to divide up the world. Winston's name is usually taken to come from Winston Churchill and the common surname Smith. Orwell's publisher Frederic Warburg wrote of the novel in an internal document, "it is imaginable that it might have a preface by Winston Churchill after whom its hero is named". Orwell had experienced wartime terror and loss prior to writing the novel. After adopting Richard, his London flat had been hit by a doodlebug. In March 1945, while in Europe, he received news of the premature death of Eileen.

At the time of writing the novel, Orwell was, like Winston, in poor health, struggling with the effects of tuberculosis. In September 1945 he visited the island of Jura in the Hebrides. He moved there in May 1946 and lived as a tenant at Barnhill, an isolated farmhouse, which was recommended by his friend David Astor. Working on the novel in a damp climate worsened his condition. By the end of 1947 he had been hospitalised at Hairmyres Hospital, near Glasgow, but returned to Jura in the summer of 1948. He was forced to type up his illegible manuscript himself due to the isolation and produced 4,000 words per day, mainly sitting ill in bed. He complained to his friends that his illness had caused him to spend 18 months working on the "wretched book", describing it as a "ghastly mess". By the time of the novel's publication he had transferred to a sanatorium near Stroud in Gloucestershire, and then removed to University College Hospital in London. At the hospital bed, he married his second wife, Sonia Brownell on 13 October 1949. His condition grew progressively worse and he died on 21 January 1950 at the age of 46.

Dorian Lynsky noted that Orwell wrote the novel as a warning and a reminder of the totalitarian regimes that he had witnessed rising in Europe and his intention was to alert his readers to the importance of protecting liberal democracy. Orwell asserted this warning in a press statement: "The moral to be drawn from this dangerous nightmare situation is a simple one. Don’t let it happen. It depends on you."

== Literary influences ==
Orwell was an avid reader throughout his life and by 1946 had accumulated an estimated nine hundred books. Amongst the books that influenced his final novel were Arthur Koestler’s Darkness at Noon, Assignment in Utopia by Eugene Lyons, and Foxe’s Book of Martyrs. Koestler's novel was based on the real events of the Great Purge. In his essay on Koestler, written in September 1944, Orwell analysed the motivations of its protagonist, Rubashov, an Old Bolshevik who is imprisoned, interrogated and eventually confesses to crimes he did not commit. Lyon's Assignment in Utopia (1937) was influential on Orwell's description of the psychological battle between Winston and O'Brien in his acceptance of the illogical statement that 2 + 2 = 5. Lyons, an American journalist in Moscow, was preoccupied with the way that Stalinist posters promoted its Five Year Plan and used this paradox to influence workers to complete the plan in four years. Orwell also took details from The Woman Who Could Not Die (1938) a memoir by Iulia de Beausobre, who was imprisoned for two years in a Soviet prison. She summarised the psychological effect of captivity as: "Am I really mad? Are they all mad? Is the whole world mad?". Orwell echoed the connection between totalitarian oppression and mental illness in Winston's struggle to maintain his sanity, with O'Brien insisting that he is "mentally deranged".

The dystopian novel We by the Russian author Yevgeny Zamyatin has been cited as a significant influence on Orwell's novel, due to its comparable plot and characters. In 1946, he wrote a review of We for the Tribune three years prior to the publication of Nineteen Eighty-Four. We had been published several years earlier in English in 1924. In his review, Orwell described it as "a study of the Machine" and considered it to be a "book to look out for". In We the protagonist D-503 lives in One State, a futuristic totalitarian society. Like Winston, D-503 rebels against its dictator, the Benefactor, and falls in love with a woman named I-330, who is a member of the resistance movement. After interrogation and torture, D-503, like Winston, capitulates to the state. Orwell also found similarities between We and Aldous Huxley's dystopian novel Brave New World, describing both works as "the rebellion of the primitive human spirit against a rationalised, mechanised, painless world". Although he admired Huxley's novel, Orwell was unconvinced by the motivations of its elite, writing in 1946: "There is no power-hunger, no sadism, no hardness of any kind" and both Orwell and Huxley found each other's dystopian vision implausible.

Orwell was also fascinated by The Managerial Revolution, a 1941 book by James Burnham that influenced his ideas for three super states and a society ruled by bureaucrats. He assessed Burnham's predictions at length in his 1946 essay Second Thoughts on James Burnham.

== Reception ==
=== Critical response ===
In the BBC Two series Faulks on Fiction, Robert Harris discussed the effectiveness of Winston as a character. Noting that Orwell had originally intended to call the novel "The Last Man in Europe", Harris emphasised that as the last survivor of a previous world Winston has a vague notion of what existed before the Party and this makes him a relatable character. Harris also felt that Winston displays similarities to the author in his physical ailments and his views on women.

In his accompanying BBC book, Sebastian Faulks wrote that Orwell's skill was to give the reader the impression that Winston is not heroic. He is brave without knowing it and his small act of defiance in writing his diary appears hopeless, which makes him an everyman character. Orwell then shows that even a small, powerless person like Winston can fight an oppressive regime. He considered Winston to be a different kind of hero for daring to have individual thoughts and love in the face of certain torture and death. Winston's characterisation was critiqued by Ben Pimlott, who commented that as a "loner and a loser" he generates sympathy but, "he never rises much above his own self-pity, and it is hard to feel the downfall of this unprepossessing fellow as a tragedy". In contrast, Erika Gottleib considered Winston to be a sympathetic character, describing him as "a true pilgrim on the journey to Truth, a man with an undeniably spiritual dimension".

Gorman Beauchamp noted that Winston's ideological battle with O'Brien is a common element of fictional dystopias, being similar to D-503 in We and John Savage in Brave New World. He considered Winston's characterisation to be secondary to his ideological position and that indepth analysis was impractical. D. J. Taylor commented on the "terrible inevitability" of Winston's fate, noting that all of Orwell's novels involve a rebel that ultimately fails and resumes his or her previous circumstance. Winston was considered to be less multifaceted than a traditional fictional character by Lillian Feder, who wrote that he is a "prototype of a man deliberately being remade by political and technological forces" and represents the struggle of the self against repression. Dorian Lynskey said that Winston is not really "the last man", he is simply one in a long line of similar characters who are broken and rebuilt by the regime. Instead of fearing Winston, the Party needs him to renew its power by crushing him, which Malcolm Muggeridge described as the "continuous performance" of power.

Margaret Atwood commented that Winston's surrender to Big Brother has been critically viewed as pessimistic, but she considered that the novel's essay on Newspeak, which is written in standard English and in the past tense, is evidence that the regime reached an end and this showed Orwell's "faith in the resilience of the human spirit". Lynskey describes this as the "Appendix Theory", the idea that Winston's story is actually a text written by another author within the novel's fictional world, suggested by a solitary footnote in the first chapter. Dennis Glover's investigation into an error that appears in the second impression of the first edition, published in March 1950, in the passage where Winston writes in the dust "2 + 2 = 5", led him to question the possibility that Orwell intended to change the ending. The "5" in the equation had disappeared and was missing for almost four decades. Glover commented that the missing "5" suggests that Winston is still capable of thoughtcrime at the end of the novel. Despite being unable to ascertain the reason for the omission, he noted that Ingsoc would be defeated by "humanity's natural tendency towards freedom".

=== 75th anniversary edition controversy ===
A preface written by American novelist Dolen Perkins-Valdez, which was added to the 75th anniversary edition published in the US in 2024 by Berkley Books and approved by The Orwell Estate, was criticised for acting as a trigger warning to readers over Winston's views of women. In the edition's introductory essay, Perkins-Valdez described Winston as a "problematic character", highlighting a passage in which Orwell wrote, "He disliked nearly all women, and especially the young and pretty ones." Her essay concluded that Orwell was expressing that Winston's misogyny was a symptom of totalitarian society. In fact, Winston's feelings are perfectly understood in context as per the novel itself, ""It was always the women, and above all the young ones, who were the most bigoted adherents of the Party, the swallowers of slogans, the amateur spies and nosers-out of unorthodoxy."

Novelist and critic Walter Kirn criticised the preface on the podcast America This Week, describing it as "the most 1984-ish thing I've ever f---ing read" and commented, "We’re getting somebody to actually convict George Orwell himself of thought crime in the introduction to his book about thought crime".

=== Impact and influence ===
When the novel was published on 8 June 1949, it achieved phenomenal sales, with 50,000 copies sold in the UK and one third of a million sold in the US. In the following decades, millions of copies have been sold. Additionally, its language, such as "newspeak", "Big Brother", "Thought Police" and "doublethink", has been adopted in published media to discuss contemporary issues. Richard Harris considered Nineteen Eighty-Four to be the most influential novel of its time and described Winston as the most unlikely hero but the most compelling. He attributed the success of the novel to its protagonist, stating that by creating Winston as a believable character, Orwell makes the reader believe in his dystopian world.

Margaret Atwood was heavily influenced by Nineteen Eighty-Four after reading it in high school a couple of years after it was published in 1949. She expressed an affinity with Winston Smith, as "a skinny person who got tired a lot" and being "silently at odds with the ideas and the manner of life proposed for him". Winston's diary of forbidden thoughts encouraged her to take up writing herself as a teenager. Later in life, she used Orwell as a model when, in 1984, she began writing the dystopian novel titled The Handmaid's Tale.

=== In popular culture ===
The American punk artist Winston Smith chose his name in reference to the character.

In 2024, an art installation on the island of Jura, comprising 1,984 copies of the novel, was created by Scottish artist Hans K Clausen and titled "The Winston Smith Library of Victory and Truth".

== Adaptations ==
Actor John Hurt portrayed Smith in the 1984 film adaptation

Winston Smith has appeared on radio, television and film in numerous adaptations of the novel.

- The first actor to play the role was David Niven in a 27 August 1949 radio adaptation for NBC's NBC University Theater.
- Richard Widmark played Smith on a 26 April 1953 broadcast of The United States Steel Hour on ABC radio.
- In the 21 September 1953 episode of Studio One, Smith was played by Eddie Albert.
- In BBC One's Nineteen Eighty-Four (1954) Smith was played by Peter Cushing.
- Vincent Price played Smith in a 1955 Australian Lux Radio Theatre adaptation.
- In the 1956 film, Smith was played by Edmond O'Brien.
- In a 1965 dramatisation broadcast on BBC Home Service, Patrick Troughton voiced the part.
- Gary Watson played the role in a three-part 1967 BBC Radio 4 adaptation.
- John Hurt played Smith in the 1984 film adaptation, 1984.
- Christopher Eccleston played the role in a two-part 2013 BBC Radio 4 dramatisation.
- In 2017, Tom Sturridge appeared as Winston alongside Olivia Wilde in a stage adaptation that opened at the Hudson Theatre on Broadway.
- Matt Smith voiced Winston in Twenty Twenty-One, a rereleased version of the novel released in 2021 as an audiobook.
- In 2024, Andrew Garfield played Winston in an Audible audio adaptation.
