= Big Brother (Nineteen Eighty-Four) =

Literary character and symbol

- Big Brother portrayed by Bob Flag in the 1984 film adaptation
- First appearance: Nineteen Eighty-Four (1949)
- Created by: George Orwell

In-universe information
- Gender: Male
- Occupation: Head Leader of Oceania

Big Brother is a character and symbol in George Orwell's 1949 dystopian novel Nineteen Eighty-Four. He is ostensibly the leader of Oceania, a totalitarian superstate wherein the ruling party, Ingsoc, wields total power for its own sake over the inhabitants. His image appears everywhere on posters within Oceanian society as a metaphor for the Party's complete control of the population. Orwell was deeply concerned with the rise of totalitarianism in the 1930s and 1940s, particularly in Stalinist Russia, Nazi Germany and Poland and wrote his novel as a warning about the potential of a totalitarian leader destroying objective truth.

In the novel, the slogan "Big Brother is watching you" serves as a constant reminder that Party members in Oceania are not entitled to privacy. They are subject to constant surveillance to ensure their ideological purity. This is primarily through omnipresent telescreens, two-way video devices used for broadcasting propaganda and for spying on individuals by the Thought Police. As the figurehead of the Party, Big Brother is omnipotent and the subject of a cult of personality, illustrated in the daily, ritualistic Two Minutes Hate, a mass demonstration of hatred for the enemy of the state, Emmanuel Goldstein and adoration for the leader, Big Brother.

"Big Brother" has become a synecdoche for abuse of power and mass surveillance, particularly with respect to civil liberties and loss of privacy. The character has been influential on popular music, including songs by Stevie Wonder and David Bowie. As a metaphor for surveillance, Big Brother also inspired the worldwide reality television show, Big Brother. He was described as one of the ten greatest villains in literature by Stephen King.

== Background ==
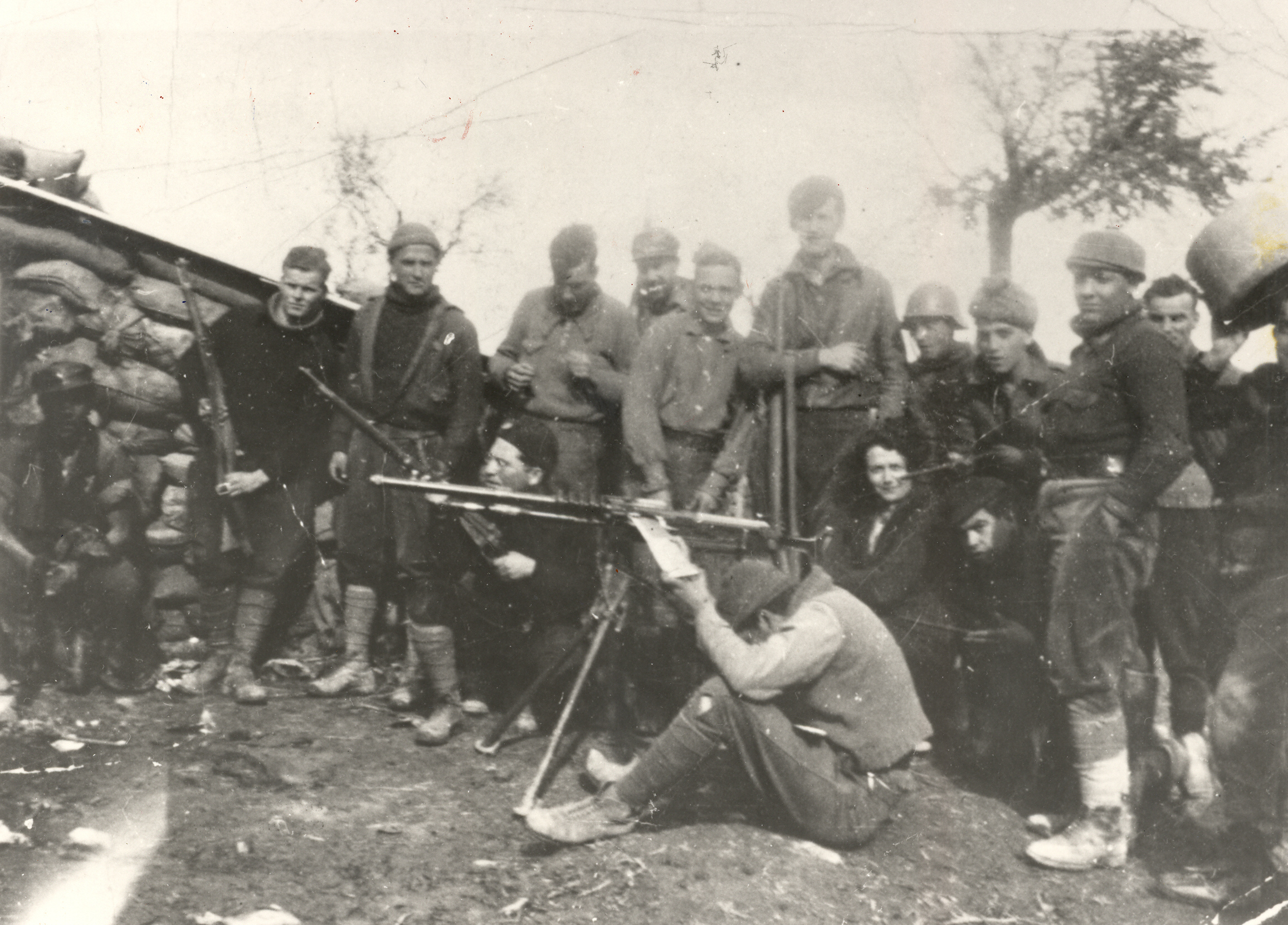
George Orwell (tallest man present) on the Aragon Front outside Huesca, 13 March 1937

The concepts of Big Brother and the totalitarian regime of Oceania in George Orwell's dystopian novel Nineteen Eighty-Four lie in his experiences in the Spanish Civil War. Orwell had volunteered to fight for the POUM and spent months on the Aragon front. In Barcelona he personally witnessed an atmosphere of terror when, in May 1937, the communists revolted against their allies resulting in five days of violence. Orwell and his wife, Eileen Blair, were forced to flee Spain. Orwell had been motivated to go to Spain by his concerns about fascism, but he discovered an atmosphere of paranoia, persecution and lies. The communists claimed that they had uncovered a network of traitors that had been working with the fascists to assassinate Republicans. This dishonesty shocked Orwell, but when he returned to England to publish what he had witnessed, he was told by friends that the truth could help to serve General Franco and fascism. The impact of his experiences was later expressed in his 1946 essay "Why I Write", in which he declared, "Every line of serious work that I have written since 1936 has been written, directly or indirectly, against totalitarianism and for democratic socialism".

Orwell became preoccupied with totalitarianism in the 1930s and gained knowledge of the rising political tyranny in Soviet Russia from leaked accounts that he read by disillusioned communists such as Boris Souvarine and André Gide. He based many elements of Oceania's totalitarian state on Russia under the leadership of Joseph Stalin and Germany under Adolf Hitler, including a cult of personality, historical revisionism, repression of free speech and the atmosphere of paranoia and fear. Orwell wrote Nineteen Eighty-Four as a satire and a fictional account of recent history. In his creation of Big Brother, he was inspired by the mystical nature of Stalin, as described in a passage by Gide: "His portrait is seen everywhere, his name is on everyone's lips, and praise of him occurs in every public speech. Is all this the result of worship, love or fear? Who can say?".

Orwell combined multiple accounts, including Assignment in Utopia (1937) by Eugene Lyons, The Woman Who Could Not Die (1938) by Iulia de Beausobre, who wrote of her two years in a Soviet prison, and Darkness at Noon (1940), Arthur Koestler's novel about the Great Purge, and synthesised this knowledge to create the fictional dictatorship of Oceania under Big Brother. He outlined some of the main ideas for the novel in his notebook from 1937 onwards under the working title The Last Man in Europe. Orwell was concerned that objective truth was fading from the world and wrote his novel as the ultimate conclusion of totalitarian destruction of truth. In his 1942 essay Looking Back on the Spanish War, Orwell wrote about the potential of "a nightmare world in which the Leader, or some ruling clique, controls not only the future but the past. If the Leader says of such and such an event, 'It never happened'– well, it never happened. If he says that two and two are five – well, two and two are five."

Orwell finished writing his novel on the island of Jura, whilst ill with tuberculosis and it was published in 1949. Nineteen Eighty-Four was written as a warning. Orwell explained to his publisher Fredric Warburg in June 1949, "the moral to be drawn from this dangerous nightmare situation is a simple one. Don’t let it happen. It depends on you".

== Conception ==
Biographer Dorian Lynskey considered Big Brother to be an amalgamation of several influences on Orwell, namely, Number One from Koestler's Darkness at Noon, the Benefactor from the novel We by Yevgeny Zamyatin, Hitler and most of all, Stalin. Gorman Beauchamp said that Big Brother was based solely on Stalin and that Oceania is a reflection of the Soviet Union in the 1930s.

The idea could be borrowed from the 1937 H. G. Wells novel Star Begotten, in which "Big Brother" is referenced as a fictitious example of "mystical personifications" able to easily manipulate the common man. In the Soviet Union there was an ideology of "brotherly nations" or "brotherly countries". The Soviet Union presented itself as a big brother who watches over its younger brothers (other nations). The ideological word 'big brother' or 'older brother' was very well known and used in the Soviet Republics before and after the Second World War.

In the essay section of his novel 1985, Anthony Burgess states that Orwell got the idea for the name of Big Brother from advertising billboards for educational correspondence courses from Bennett College during World War II. The original posters showed J. M. Bennett with the phrase "Let me be your father." After Bennett's death, his son took over the company and the posters were replaced with the text "Let me be your big brother".

A theory made by Mr. W.J. West, a London book collector, who found radio transcripts and over 250 letters written by Orwell during his years at the BBC, that the inspiration for Big Brother was Brendan Bracken, the Minister of Information, based on Orwell's use of the initials B.B., was discredited as speculation by Gordon B. Beadle. David M. Lubin postulated that Big Brother's visage was based on Herbert Kitchener, whom Orwell admired as a child. Kitchener's face appeared on Alfred Leete's 1914 British military recruitment poster Lord Kitchener Wants You.

== Role in Nineteen Eighty-Four ==
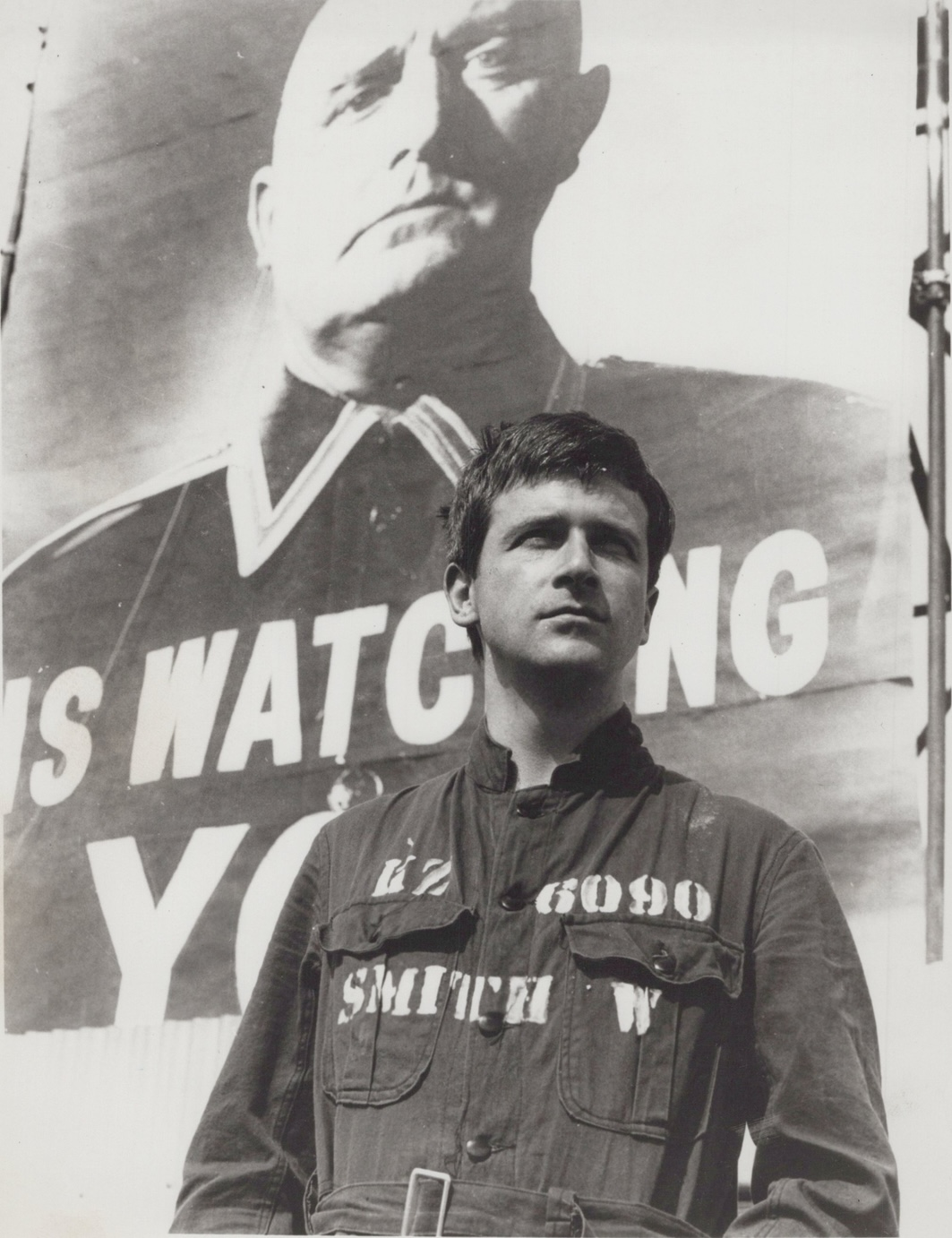
David Buck as Winston in front of a poster of Big Brother, for the 1965 Theatre 625 adaptation of Nineteen Eighty-Four

Big Brother is the leader of a totalitarian superstate named Oceania, a hierarchical society consisting of the Inner Party, the Outer Party and the "proles". The novel is set in London within the region of Airstrip One. He is described through the viewpoint of the novel's protagonist, Winston Smith, who experiences a midlife crisis when he begins to question the political ruling party of Oceania named Ingsoc. Winston is employed at the Ministry of Truth, where he rectifies inconvenient historical fact in accordance with the ever-changing party line. He begins to rebel against the Party and develops a hatred for its leader Big Brother.

Big Brother is described in the novel as "a man of about forty-five, with a heavy black moustache and ruggedly handsome features" and later as "black-haired, black-moustachioed, full of power and mysterious calm". His image appears everywhere on posters in public places:

On each landing, opposite the lift-shaft, the poster with the enormous face gazed from the wall. It was one of those pictures which are so contrived that the eyes follow you about when you move. BIG BROTHER IS WATCHING YOU, the caption beneath it ran.

— George Orwell, Nineteen Eighty-Four, Part I, Chapter I

Through Winston's personal rebellion, Orwell describes the full extent of the Party's power. Ingsoc employs the brutal methods of totalitarian control, through purges of dissidents, mass surveillance through a two-way device called a telescreen, propaganda events and psychological manipulation. Although rules of social behaviour are not written, members of the Outer Party, of which Winston is a member, are expected to conform completely. When Winston engages in an illicit affair with Julia, he is unaware that they are monitored by the Thought Police and mistakenly believes that the Party can never control his inner mind. Upon their arrest, he is tortured in Room 101 and converted to a mindless, obedient citizen of Oceania who loves Big Brother.

== Characterisation ==
=== The Party's eye ===
Big Brother's omnipresent gaze found on coins, stamps and posters in Oceania is a visual metaphor of the Party's mass surveillance of the population and its social control. Like the telescreen, Big Brother's face appears everywhere in society. In Oceania, it is impossible for the individual to see reality unless it is through the eyes of the Party. The telescreen is used both for broadcasting propaganda to the masses, but also to spy on individuals, as an extension of the Thought Police, which makes it an essential aspect of the Party's totalitarian control. Erika Gottleib writes that Orwell employs the mystical symbol of the all-seeing eye, which represents man being in the presence of God. Winston is horrified by the pervasive all-seeing eye and attempts to hide from its gaze until he is consumed by it and his individuality is broken in Room 101 where he finds a union with the Godhead. The Party uses Big Brother's eye not only to outwardly enforce obedience, but to penetrate the mind, so that the authority of the Party is internalised by the individual as an ultimate control of the self.

=== Cult of personality ===
Big Brother is the subject of a cult of personality, which Winston witnesses in the daily ritual called the Two Minutes Hate. It is broadcast from a large telescreen and its purpose is to create an emotional reaction in the audience. The event begins with a terrible screeching sound, followed by the face of the enemy of the state, Emmanuel Goldstein displayed on the screen, which generates hissing from the audience. The frenzy of hate reaches a climax and is then replaced with ecstasy, as the face of Big Brother appears.

At this moment the entire group of people broke into a deep, slow, rhythmic chant of 'B-B! ... B-B! ... B-B!'—over and over again, very slowly, with a long pause between the first 'B' and the second—a heavy murmurous sound, somehow curiously savage, in the background of which one seemed to hear the stamps of naked feet and the throbbing of tom-toms. For perhaps as much as thirty seconds they kept it up. It was a refrain that was often heard in moments of overwhelming emotion. Partly it was a sort of hymn to the wisdom and majesty of Big Brother, but still more it was an act of self-hypnosis, a deliberate drowning of consciousness by means of rhythmic noise.

— George Orwell, Nineteen Eighty-Four, Part I, Chapter I

The emotional response of the audience towards Big Brother is intensified by the limited access to food and comforts available within Oceania's totalitarian society. Additionally, the Party limits all pleasure, ensuring that only the love for Big Brother exists. Such demonstrations of devotion distract the population from enduring the discomfort and restrictions of daily life.

=== Omnipotent figurehead ===
Through the continual revision of historical fact, the Party ensures that it is infallible and that Big Brother is omnipotent. The primary slogan of the Party is "who controls the past controls the future, who controls the present controls the past". Winston has only vague memories, such as the moment he first heard of Big Brother, and is denied any possibility of corroborating his memories. The Party ensures that history is continually revised to maintain the myth of its perfection. It is unclear if Big Brother is or had been a real person, or is a fictional personification of the Party. In the fictional book The Theory and Practice of Oligarchical Collectivism, read by Winston and purportedly written by Emmanuel Goldstein, Big Brother is referred to as infallible and all-powerful. No one has ever seen him and there is a reasonable certainty that he will never die. He is simply "the guise in which the Party chooses to exhibit itself to the world" since the emotions of love, fear and reverence are more easily focused on an individual than an organisation. When Winston is later arrested, O'Brien states that Big Brother will never die. When Smith asks if Big Brother exists, O'Brien describes him as "the embodiment of the Party". O'Brien also explains the reason for Big Brother's existence: "The object of persecution is persecution. The object of torture is torture. The object of power is power."

== Critical response ==
When Nineteen Eighty-Four was published on 8 June 1949, the critical response was overwhelmingly positive. Many critics praised Orwell for the novel's terrifying vision. Lynskey writes that the most observant critics recognised Orwell's message that the seeds of totalitarianism are amongst us. E. M. Forster wrote, "Behind Stalin lurks Big Brother, which seems appropriate, but Big Brother also lurks behind Churchill, Truman, Gandhi, and any leader whom propaganda utilizes or invents". Sally Watson-Jones writing in The Guardian described him as a "terrifying villain" due to his omnipotence as a god-like character made by the Inner Party. She commented that his existence is unimportant as his power comes from his superiority: "He is never wrong, has no idiosyncrasies that can be exploited, no personality that can be manipulated, no desire that can be leveraged against him." American author Stephen King ranked Big Brother as one of the ten greatest fictional villains in books for Entertainment Weekly due to him "watching you from every telescreen in George Orwell’s more-relevant-than-ever novel of a nightmare dictatorship". Orwell was credited by Robert C. Tucker for showing through Winston how the Party's purpose is to make everyone love Big Brother and how the horrors of the nightmare state are enacted by functionaries and the mass population in service to the dictatorial leader. Beauchamp described Big Brother as "probably the most famous figure in serious twentieth century literature". He said that although Big Brother never truly appears as a character in the novel, he has become a cultural symbol widely referenced outside his fictional context.

== Adaptations ==
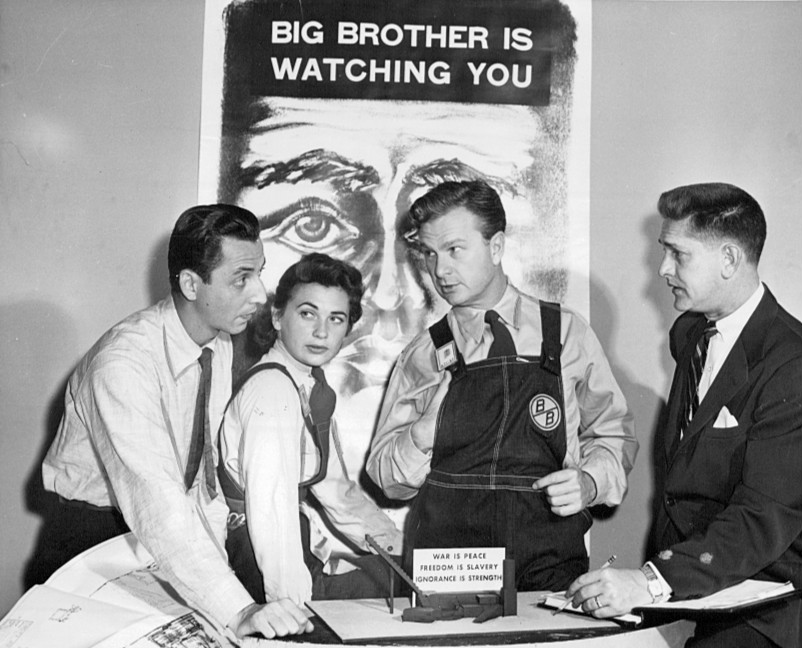
Publicity photo on the set of the 1953 Westinghouse Studio One adaptation with a poster of Big Brother

In the 1953 Westinghouse Studio One adaptation, which was broadcast on CBS, the role of Big Brother was given to Lorne Green. The character, represented solely by a single still photograph, was played in the 1954 BBC television adaptation by production designer Roy Oxley. In the 1956 film adaptation, Big Brother was represented by an illustration of a stern-looking disembodied head. In the 1984 film adaptation starring John Hurt, the Big Brother still image was of actor Bob Flag.

== Cultural influence ==
=== Impact on language ===
The Wall Street Journal said that of all the concepts and phrases from Nineteen Eighty-Four that have been adopted in common language, "Big Brother" is the most pervasive. Ben Zimmer wrote that its current use has subverted its earlier meaning of an older brother, protector or carer. In the early 1900s, the phrase was commonly associated with charities, such as the Big Brothers movement, which in 1904 facilitated youth mentoring in New York City, later expanding to Big Brothers Big Sisters of America.

=== Use as metaphor ===
Since the publication of Nineteen Eighty-Four, the phrase "Big Brother" has been commonly used as a synecdoche to describe any overly-controlling authority figure, increased government surveillance and loss of privacy. Immediately after the novel's publication Life magazine, in its 4 July 1949 issue, warned that the United States could fall under the influence of a Big Brother figure. The Oxford English Dictionary states that it came into common use in 1953. The 1954 BBC television adaptation was influential in raising awareness of the novel to the general public, as it was performed twice and was particularly unsettling for viewers. The Times reported: "The term 'Big Brother' which the day before yesterday meant nothing to 99% of the population, has become a household phrase".

During the 1950s it was used for a wide range of targets, including the Conservative government, President Eisenhower, Lord Beaverbrook, Mao's China, the House of Lords, trade union leadership, the Coal Board and the Post Office.

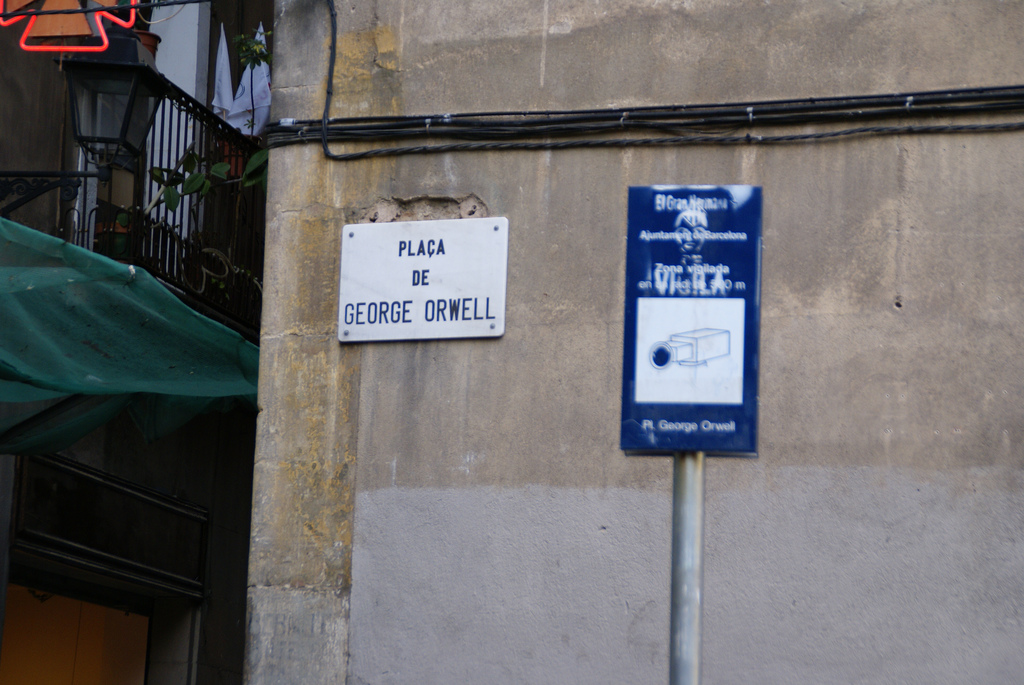
CCTV in George Orwell Square in Barcelona, Spain

In 2007, concerns about the rise of surveillance cameras in the UK led to the Commons home affairs select committee launching an inquiry. A report published by the Royal Academy of Engineering recommended the use of "community webcams", which it said would "prevent a Big Brother state". Big Brother Watch, a British civil liberties campaign group founded in 2009, is named after Orwell's character with the aim of campaigning against state surveillance. Big Brother was again referenced in relation to concerns about state surveillance in the UK in 2019, when the government's surveillance camera commissioner warned that the country was moving towards a surveillance society through the use of technology, such as CCTV in public places and facial recognition cameras. In May 2025, El Pais reported on the large network of video surveillance and facial recognition cameras used in São Paulo named Smart Sampa, describing it as "'Big Brother' is watching with 25,000 cameras".

The Times described the cancellation of the 1984 film adaptation of Nineteen Eighty-Four in Thailand in 2014 as a ban by "Thailand's Big Brother". When the film was due to be screened by the Punya Movie Club in Chiang Mai, the art gallery booked for the screening was warned by police for the film's political content. The novel was viewed symbolically as a protest against General Prayut Chan-ocha, who had seized power in a 2014 political coup and had been depicted in posters as Big Brother. China's Social Credit System has been described as akin to "Big Brother" by detractors, where citizens and businesses are given or deducted good behavior points depending on their choices. In September 2025, The Independent reported that the proposed introduction of digital identity cards in the UK raised fears of a "Big Brother state" and a "dystopian nightmare" based on concerns about privacy and civil liberties.

Big Brother has been referenced in concerns about online privacy issues, including the gathering of personal data by tech companies. The rise of artificial intelligence also raised concerns about the use of personal data, with the phrase "Big Brother" being incorporated into media headlines. Shoshana Zuboff wrote in Time about the rise of surveillance capitalism, comparing Big Brother to a "Big Other" in which human experience data on the Internet is captured and computed to predict behaviour: "impersonal systems trained to monitor and shape our actions remotely, unimpeded by law". Tim Harford in a BBC article warned about "'Big Brother' technology", comparing the telescreen used to monitor the population by Big Brother in the novel to devices like voice-activated smart speakers produced by large corporations. The growth of worker surveillance technology, including turnstile data and monitoring software of mobile and home-based workers was described as "your Big Brother boss" by Charles Arthur in The Independent. Flock Cameras are another example frequently brought up as a real world version of Big Brother.

Maria Bustillos wrote in The New Yorker about the emergence of "Little Brother", the use of technology by citizens to record public events and observe those in authority, which was described as "inverse panopticon 'sousveillance'". In 2010, Walter Kirn commented in The New York Times that "Little Brother" intrusion of personal space through webcams and viral videos had replaced Big Brother surveillance as the prevalent challenge in everyday life. The New York Times said that Big Brother was the most ubiquitous metaphor for mass surveillance, but postulated that surveillance technology has become too sophisticated for the phrase to accurately capture the extent of the threat.

=== In popular culture ===
In the decades following the publication of Nineteen Eighty-Four, many musicians have been inspired by its concepts. In 1971, the American rock band Rare Earth released "Hey Big Brother", which includes the lyrics, "If we don't get our thing together, Big Brother will be watching us". In the song titled "Only People" (1973), John Lennon sings the line "We don't want no Big Brother scene". American musician Stevie Wonder included the track "Big Brother" on his studio album Talking Book (1972), comprising lyrics focusing on America's treatment of minorities. The English musician David Bowie gained an appreciation of the novel from an early age. He had wanted to create a television adaptation but could not get the rights. His studio album Diamond Dogs (1974) incorporates themes from the novel in the tracks "Big Brother" and "1984". In 1979, the American punk rock band Dead Kennedys released a song titled "California Über Alles", which compared governor of California, Jerry Brown to "Big Bro on white horse". The British punk band Subhumans wrote a song named "Big Brother", using the theme of mass surveillance as a commentary on mainstream media. British rock band The Alan Parsons Project said that their sixth studio album and single titled "Eye in the Sky" was inspired by Orwell's novel and that they based the album on the concept that Big Brother is watching. Rage Against the Machine incorporated the lyrics "Orwell’s hell a terror era coming through/ But this little brother is watching you too" in the track "Voice of the Voiceless", released in 1999. An album track released in 2004 by Girls Aloud is also titled "Big Brother" and features the lyrics, "Big Brother's watching me/ And I don't really mind."

On New Year's Day, 1984, an international satellite installation by Nam June Paik titled Good Morning, Mr. Orwell was televised as a celebration of television and a rebuttal to Orwell's dystopian vision. The show featured American rock band Oingo Boingo performing the song "Wake Up, (It's 1984)", which includes the lyrics, "Big Brother's screaming but we don't care, cause he's got nothing to say". Paik admitted to The New York Times that he had not read the novel, describing it as "boring".

The image of Big Brother played a key role in Apple's "1984" television commercial introducing the Macintosh, which aired at Super Bowl XVIII on 22 January 1984. The Orwell Estate viewed the Apple commercial as a copyright infringement and sent a cease-and-desist letter to Apple and its advertising agency. The commercial was never televised again. Subsequent ads featuring Steve Jobs mimicked the format and appearance of the original ad campaign.

The worldwide reality television show Big Brother is based on the novel's concept of people being under constant surveillance. In 2000, after the United States version of the CBS program Big Brother premiered, the Orwell Estate sued CBS and its production company Orwell Productions, Inc. in federal court in Chicago for copyright and trademark infringement. The case was settled but the amount that CBS paid to the Orwell Estate was not disclosed.

Due to Orwell's work entering the public domain in 2021 in the UK and 2040 in the US, the literary agency AM Heath had the phrase "Big Brother is watching you" trademarked to ensure that the Orwell Estate maintains control of merchandise.

The phrase "Big Brother is watching you" features in the design of a commemorative £2 coin produced by the Royal Mint in 2025 to mark 75 years since Orwell's death.

== See also ==
- Big Brother Awards
- Little Brother (Doctorow novel)
- List of fictional dictators
- Media related to Big Brother at Wikimedia Commons
