= Adaptations of Nineteen Eighty-Four =

Adaptations of the novel Nineteen Eighty-Four by George Orwell into other mediums

George Orwell's 1949 dystopian political novel Nineteen Eighty-Four, has been adapted for the cinema, radio, television, theatre, opera and ballet.

== Film adaptations ==
=== 1984 (1956) ===
- The first feature-length adaptation, 1984, directed by Michael Anderson and produced by N. Peter Rathvon, was released in 1956. It starred Edmond O'Brien as protagonist Winston Smith with Donald Pleasence as Mr Parsons, Jan Sterling as Julia, and Michael Redgrave as O'Brien (renamed O'Connor).

=== Nineteen Eighty-Four (1984) ===
- The second feature-length adaptation, Nineteen Eighty-Four, was directed by Michael Radford and was released in 1984. It is a reasonably faithful adaptation of the novel and was critically acclaimed. Many of the film's scenes were shot on the actual dates mentioned in the novel. For example, the scene in which Winston Smith writes the date "April 4, 1984" in his diary was filmed on April 4, 1984. The film's soundtrack was performed by the band Eurythmics and a single from it, "Sexcrime (1984)", was a hit in several countries. The film contained Richard Burton's last performance.

=== 1984 (2023) ===
In November 2022 it was announced that the feature-length adaptation by Finnish director Diana Ringo was filmed and would be released in 2023. The film is co-produced with Russia and is the first Russian language adaptation of the novel. The film 1984 was released on 15 November 2023.

=== 1984 (Unproduced Paul Greengrass project) ===
In March 2012 it was announced that a consortium of Hollywood production companies including Imagine Entertainment was set to reboot and make a new feature film based on the novel. Reportedly the consortium secured rights from Orwell's estate. However, no further developments were revealed for some time. In November 2015, Paul Greengrass was attached to direct with Scott Rudin and Gina Rosenblum producing and James Graham writing the screenplay. Rudin and Greengrass had also previously worked together on Captain Phillips. Michael De Luca would oversee production of this version of 1984 film for the studio.

In 2017, Graham began a rewrite of the film in response to the 2016 United States presidential election and Donald Trump's presidency, which had increased interest in the book. He claimed that the film would be released by 2019.

In 2020, Graham confirmed that the project had been postponed after they had difficulty writing a script:

"Paul and I got very excited about it and then [we realized] it's a difficult project. The book is just so bloody perfect, we started going: 'Let's just pause for a second.' The world of surveillance and tech moves on so quickly, we just needed to have a broader view of it."

== Television adaptations ==
=== CBS's Studio One: 1984 (1953) ===
The first television version of Nineteen Eighty-Four appeared in CBS's Studio One series in 1953. In it American actor Eddie Albert played Winston Smith and Canadian Lorne Greene played O'Brien.

=== Sunday Night Play: 1984 (1954) ===
The second television version was adapted by Nigel Kneale for the BBC as a Sunday-Night Play in 1954 featuring Peter Cushing as Smith, André Morell as O'Brien, Yvonne Mitchell as Julia and Donald Pleasence as Syme.

=== The World of George Orwell: 1984 (1965) ===
Kneale's 1954 adaptation was produced again by the BBC, with some modifications in 1965, directed by Christopher Morahan. Starring David Buck, Joseph O'Conor, Jane Merrow and Cyril Shaps, it was broadcast in BBC2's Theatre 625 anthology series as part of a season of Orwell adaptations sub-titled The World of George Orwell, on 28 November 1965. Long believed lost, on 12 September 2010 it was announced in the media that a copy had been located at the American Library of Congress, although an approximately seven-minute segment in the middle was damaged and irrecoverable from the NTSC videotape. It was found amongst a hoard of over 80 lost British television episodes dating from 1957 to 1970.

== Audio adaptations ==
=== NBC: Nineteen Eighty-Four (1949) ===
The first radio broadcast of Nineteen Eighty-Four was a one-hour adaptation transmitted by the United States' NBC radio network at 9pm. on August 27, 1949 as number 55 in the series NBC University Theater, which adapted the world's great novels for broadcast; it starred David Niven as Smith.

=== NBC: Nineteen Eighty-Four (1953) ===
Another broadcast on the NBC radio network was made by The Theatre Guild on The Air on Sunday April 26, 1953 for The United States Steel Hour starring Richard Widmark as Smith, Marian Seldes as Julia and Alan Hewitt as O'Brien.

=== CBC: 1984 (1953) ===
In November, the CBC broadcast a 90-minute adaptation written by Melwyn Breen and directed by Esse Ljungh as an episode of its CBC Wednesday Night program. The production featured Bill Needles as Winston Smith, Budd Knapp as Big Brother, Kate Reid as Julia, Frank Peddie as Charington, and Paul Kligman. In April 1954, it won an Ohio State Award at the 18th American Exhibition of Educational Radio-Television Programs for "powerful and significant drama, superbly presented ... an accurate, gripping projection of a book which hereby gains a vastly wider audience."

=== MBN (Australia): Nineteen Eighty-Four (1955) ===
Vincent Price starred in an Australian radio adaptation produced on the Lux Radio Theatre by the Major Broadcasting Network in Sydney, Australia.

=== BBC: Nineteen Eighty-Four (1965) ===
In the United Kingdom, the BBC Home Service produced a 90-minute version with Patrick Troughton as Smith and Sylvia Syms as Julia, scripted by Eric Ewens and first broadcast on October 11, 1965. This adaptation was lost but later re-discovered by the Radio Circle and re-broadcast on BBC Radio 4 Extra in 2025 as part of a strand called "Hidden Treasures".

=== BBC: Nineteen Eighty-Four (1967) ===
A three-part adaptation by Stuart Evans broadcast on BBC Radio 4 8–22 November 1967, with Alan Wheatley as the Narrator, Gary Watson as Smith, Diana Olsson as Julia and Kevin Flood as O'Brien.

=== Pacifica Radio: Nineteen Eighty-Four (1975) ===
Between January 2 and February 7, 1975, the book was read over the air in its entirety by blacklisted writer and Pacifica Radio host Charles Morgan and legendary voiceover artist June Foray, with bridge music and some sound effects. On June 27, 2017, the original recordings were simultaneously rebroadcast in a 15-hour marathon over all five Pacifica-owned stations.

=== BBC: Nineteen Eighty-Four (1984) ===
As part of the Book at Bedtime series, BBC Radio 4 broadcast an abridged reading by Kenneth Haigh of the novel in fifteen parts from 2–20 January 1984.

=== BBC: Nineteen Eighty-Four (2005) ===
In April and May 2005, BBC Radio 2 broadcast an abridged reading by Corin Redgrave of the novel in eight weekly parts.

=== BBC: Nineteen Eighty-Four (2013) ===
As part of the 2013 The Real George Orwell season, BBC Radio 4 broadcast a two-part adaptation starring Christopher Eccleston as Smith, Pippa Nixon as Julia and Tim Pigott-Smith as O'Brien on February 10 and 17.

=== Audible: George Orwell's 1984 (2024) ===
In 2024, Audible released an audiobook adaptation of the novel. Adapted by playwright Joe White, it stars Andrew Garfield as Smith, Tom Hardy as Big Brother, Cynthia Erivo as Julia, Andrew Scott as O'Brien, Romesh Ranganathan as Parsons, Natasia Demetriou as Mrs. Parsons, Chukwudi Iwuji as Charrington, and Francesca Mills as Syme, with Katie Leung and Alex Lawther in supporting roles. It was directed by Destiny Ekaragha and features a score by Matt Bellamy and Ilan Eshkeri, performed by a 60 piece orchestra at Abbey Road Studios.

== Theatre adaptations ==
The novel has been adapted for the stage several times, including by playwrights Alan Lyddiard and Michael Gene Sullivan. In 1976, a theatre version of 1984 was produced in Teatar &TD, from Zagreb, former Yugoslavia. The performance, which also included CCTV monitoring system, was adapted and directed by Nenad Puhovski. It created some political controversies, but was never banned.

A 2013 adaptation by Robert Icke and Duncan MacMillan for the Headlong Theatre Company, which took the novel's Newspeak appendix as its starting point, has toured the UK extensively, as well as played commercially in the West End. A Broadway production began previews 18 May and opened on 22 June 2017 at the Hudson Theatre running until 8 October for 125 performances, while an Australian production began a six-city limited tour from 13 May 2017.

Theatre composer Jonathan Larson began writing a musical adaptation of Nineteen Eighty-Four in 1982, as his first attempt at writing a full-length musical. Although the Orwell estate was reportedly interested, they ultimately denied him the rights due to the then-upcoming film adaptation. Instead, Larson focused on a similar dystopian musical titled Superbia, which used some of the cut songs from his 1984, although it also went unproduced. Songs from Superbia, including ones originally written for Larson's 1984, have been released over the years and are featured prominently in the autobiographical musical Tick, Tick… Boom! and its film adaptation.

A new stage adaptation by Ryan Craig and directed by Lindsay Posner opened at the Theatre Royal, Bath in September 2024 before embarking on a UK tour.

== Operatic adaptation ==
=== 1984 (2005) ===
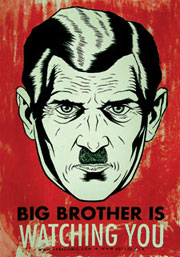
Big Brother by Frederic Guimont (inspired by a famous poster of Adolf Hitler's election in 1932)

The opera 1984 was composed by Lorin Maazel and directed by Robert Lepage. The libretto is by Tom Meehan, who worked on The Producers, and JD McClatchy, professor of poetry at Yale University. The opera premiered on 3 May 2005 at the Royal Opera House, Covent Garden.

== Ballet adaptation ==
In 2015 Leeds-based Northern Ballet commissioned choreographer Jonathan Watkins to create a ballet version of the George Orwell novel. In 2016 the ballet was filmed for television and streaming online by The Space and it was broadcast on BBC Four on 28 February 2016. Music for the production was by Alex Baranowski, sets & costume designs were by Simon Daw, and lighting was by Chris Davey (which was nominated for a Knights of Theatre Award).

== Comic adaptations ==
- 1984, incomplete unofficial webcomic by Canadian artist Frédéric Guimont (2007)
- 1984 was one of classics adapted as a manga by East Press' Manga de Dokuha series. The adaptation was released in January 2012 in Japan, with a Spanish translation also released later.
- 1984, adaptation and illustrated by Fido Nesti.
- 1984, adaptation and illustrated by Xavier Coste, published by Sarbacane. (2021)
- 1984, adaptation and illustrated by Frédéric Pontarolo, published by Michel Lafon (2021)
- 1984, adaptation by Sybille Titeux of La Croix (script) and Amazing Améziane (art), published by Rocher (2021)

== Video game adaptations ==
A video game called Big Brother was developed by MediaX as a video game sequel to the novel. Officially licensed by the Orwell estate, shown at E3 1998 with plans for release in fall that year, and winning the 3rd Golden Satellite Awards for CD-ROM Entertainment, the project was canceled in 1999 after the developer lost the license and failed to find a publisher. A work-in-progress build was posted to the Internet Archive in March 2025.

== See also ==
- Brazil (1985 film)
- Equals (film)
- Equilibrium (film)
- The Twentieth Century (film)
- THX 1138
- V for Vendetta (film)
- V for Vendetta
