= The Structure of Politics at the Accession of George III =

1929 book by Lewis Namier

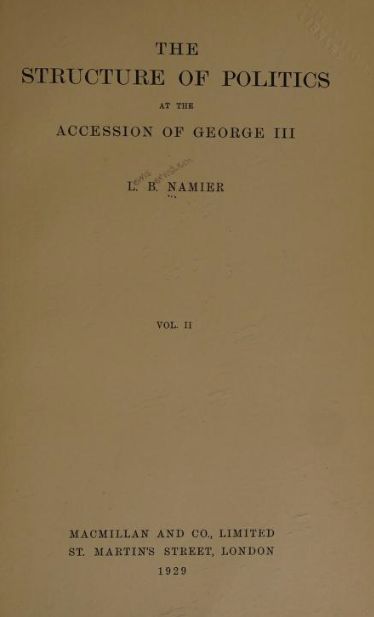
- Title page for The Structure of Politics at the Accession of George III (1929)
- Author: Lewis Namier
- Language: English
- Genre: Non-fiction
- Publication date: 1929

The Structure of Politics at the Accession of George III is the title of a book written by Lewis Namier. At the time of its first publication in 1929, it caused a historiographical revolution in understanding the 18th century by challenging the Whig view of history that English politics had always been dominated by two parties.

== Subject ==
The book covers the composition of the Parliament of Great Britain in the 1760s particularly covering English politics, an area Namier was considered to be particularly authoritative. His principal conclusion of that decade was that British politics in the mid-1760s was very loosely partisan and governed more by a set of personal alliances within the wider power structure, which was a direct repudiation of the Whig view that English politics had always been dominated by two parties. By way of its very detailed study of individuals, this course of study caused substantial revision to accounts based on a party system.

== Thesis ==
Namier argued against the prevailing if declining Whig interpretation of the struggle against George III as a stage in the long term conflict between liberty and tyranny where although the king by now lacked the power to openly challenge the House of Commons' authority, it instead tried to drain power from parliament through corruption which led to the loss of the American colonies. The book argues that eighteenth century British politics was run by a network of powerful families, with the help of dependent clients with the Court as only the most important of the great families using fundamentally the same methods, albeit with greater means. However, George III could justifiably claim that he more closely embodied the national interest than the other territorial magnates and noble families who controlled Parliament. This was part of a centuries long tradition of political independence through an active share in local and national government meaning that English liberty did not result from a revolt against an aristocratic power but its gradual extension.

== Structure ==
The book consisted of nine chapters, the first two were surveys of the backgrounds of people who became MPs looking at particular types of MPs while studiously avoiding parties. There is then a chapter detailing the differing electoral structures within English constituencies in 1760. There are then two essays on more specific nation topics, a consciously revisionist essay on the 1761 General Election and another essay on the management of the secret service funds by The Duke of Newcastle aiming to show that the fund was used more as a charitable resource for the distressed but well connected rather than a means to influence parliament, and the secret service accounts are reproduced in an appendix.

A second volume looks at specific boroughs looking first at politics in the relatively independent and uncorrupted county of Shropshire which sent a Whig delegation from the relatively Tory north west of England due to the influence of Henry Herbert, the Earl of Powis and Robert Clive - but in the end claimed to show that despite the appearances of a party organisation there the personal rivalry within parties and connections across parties were more important. There was then a survey of the widely perceived rotten Cornish borough seats as these were more dependent on the government and outside influence and showing that these were far less aristocratic than many other counties. There was then an analysis of two borough seats that were politically managed by the Treasury – Harwich and Orford and finally a set of biographical of MPs who drew secret service pensions aiming to underscore that these payments were unimportant in terms of influence.

== Method ==
Namier used prosopography or collective biography of every Member of Parliament (MP) and peer who sat in the British Parliament in the latter 18th century to reveal that local interests, not national ones, often determined how parliamentarians voted. Namier argued very strongly that far from being tightly organised groups, both the Tories and Whigs were collections of ever-shifting and fluid small groups whose stances altered on an issue-by-issue basis. Namier felt that prosopographical methods were the best for analysing small groups like the House of Commons, but he was opposed to the application of prosopography to larger groups.

"What Namier's minutely detailed studies revealed was the fact that politics in 1760 consisted mainly in the jockeying for position and influence by individuals within the political elite" rather than ideas such as liberty or democracy, or rivalry with foreign kings, or social effects of industrial and technological change. Richard J. Evans wrote that "spending many years himself, off and on, in psychoanalysis, [Namier] believed that the "deep-seated drives and emotions" of the individual were what explained politics."

== Similar Works ==
In 1930, a year after first publishing The Structure of Politics at the Accession of George III Namier published England in the Age of the American Revolution which developed his structural analysis and in the 1930s they were often treated together. The second book aimed to refute the idea that George III was set on undermining American liberties. A number of Namier's students published similar works using structural analysis to analyse eighteenth century English politics, such as John Brooke's biography of Charles Townshend.

In 1931, shortly after first publishing Structure of Politics and England in the Age of the American Revolution he became a professor at Manchester University and focused more on diplomatic history. But in 1953 he retired from Manchester and in 1957 a second version of Structure of Politics was published. Also after Namier retired he intensified work on the History of Parliament series, concentrating on the same mid eighteenth century period, although that volume had to be completed after his death by his student and co-editor John Brooke. His writing for the History of Parliament series concentrated on the social makeup of MPs and their ties to one another, in the same vein as the first chapters of Structure of Politics, reflecting his idea that "the social history of England could be written in terms of the membership of the House of Commons.

== Controversy ==
Namier used sources such as wills and tax records to reveal the interests of the MPs. In his time, his methods were new and quite controversial. His obsession with collecting facts such as club membership of various MPs and then attempting to correlate them with voting patterns led his critics to accuse him of "taking ideas out of history". Namier has been described by the historian Lawrence Stone as a member of an 'elitist school' with a 'deeply pessimistic attitude toward human affairs'.

His biographer John Cannon concludes:

Namier's achievements were greatly praised during his lifetime and unduly disparaged subsequently. On his chosen ground, the accession of George III, he made important and probably irreversible corrections to the traditional whiggish account....Later on Namier was not so much repudiated as outflanked, by critics who pointed to the narrowness of his concerns, and his lack of interest in anything but political history. The technique of structural analysis, with which his name was inextricably linked as 'Namierism', offered, in his view, an escape from voluminous narrative....[but] its limitations are very evident. There are great swathes of history where, for lack of evidence, structural analysis can hardly be applied. Even where it can, there is no guarantee that it will, in itself, generate interesting and important questions.

== Critical reception ==
Structure and Politics has been regarded by many as a departure from the previous historiography on George III with one historian saying that Namier's work "mark the beginning of the modern period". The work was seen as a counterpoint to the Whig historians, particularly G M Trevelyan and Erskine May who saw a more assertive monarchy at the accession of George III rather than Namier's assertion that the practice showed little difference from that of George II or George I. Herbert Butterfield, who wrote The Whig Interpretation of History very soon afterwards, was also critical, arguing that Namier was too detailed to draw broad conclusions and those conclusions he had drawn were not new.
