= Nineteen Eighty-Four (1984 film) =

British dystopian film by Michael Radford

- British theatrical release poster
- Directed by: Michael Radford
- Written by: Michael Radford
- Based on: Nineteen Eighty-Four by George Orwell
- Produced by: Simon Perry
- Starring: John Hurt; Richard Burton; Suzanna Hamilton; Cyril Cusack
- Cinematography: Roger Deakins
- Edited by: Tom Priestley
- Music by: Dominic Muldowney; Eurythmics
- Production companies: Virgin Films; Umbrella-Rosenblum Films
- Distributed by: 20th Century Fox (UK); Atlantic Releasing (US)
- Release date: 10 October 1984 (United Kingdom)
- Running time: 110 minutes (Note: Canby's New York Times review lists the film's running time as 117 minutes.)
- Country: United Kingdom
- Language: English
- Budget: £5.5 million
- Box office: $8.4 million (United States)

Nineteen Eighty-Four (stylized as 1984) is a 1984 British dystopian film written and directed by Michael Radford, based on George Orwell's 1949 novel. Starring John Hurt, Richard Burton, Suzanna Hamilton and Cyril Cusack, it follows the life of Winston Smith (Hurt), a low-ranking civil servant in a war-torn London in Oceania, a totalitarian superstate ruled by Ingsoc and its leader Big Brother. Smith struggles to maintain his sanity and his grip on reality as the regime's overwhelming power and influence persecute individualism and individual thinking on both a political and a personal level.

Nineteen Eighty-Four was Burton's last screen appearance; it was released two months after his death and is dedicated to him. It was released in the United Kingdom on 10 October 1984 by Virgin Films. It received positive reviews from critics, with many highlighting Deakins' cinematography and use of bleach bypass and it was a moderate success at the box office. It was nominated for a BAFTA Award for Best Art Direction, and won two Evening Standard British Film Awards for Best Film and Best Actor.

== Plot ==
In a dystopian 1984, Winston Smith endures a squalid existence in the totalitarian superstate of Oceania under the constant surveillance of the Thought Police. He resides in London, the capital city of the territory of Airstrip One, formerly Britain, and works in a small office cubicle at the Ministry of Truth, rewriting history as dictated by the Party and its supreme leader, Big Brother, who never appears publicly but instead appears only on propaganda posters, advertising billboards and television monitors. Smith attends mandatory public rallies at Victory Square (formerly Trafalgar Square), where citizens are shown propaganda films of the current war situation as well as contradictory and false news stories about Oceania's war effort to unite the civilized world under Big Brother's rule. While his co-worker and neighbour Parsons seems content to follow the state's laws, Winston, haunted by painful childhood memories and restless carnal desires, keeps a secret diary of his private thoughts, thus creating evidence of his thoughtcrime. However, he tries to do it out of sight of the telescreens, to maintain his safety.

His life greatly changes when he is accosted by his fellow Outer Party worker Julia, a mysterious, bold-looking, sensual and free-spirited young woman who works as a print machine mechanic in the Ministry of Truth, and they begin an illicit affair. During their first meeting in the remote countryside, they exchange subversive ideas before having sex. Shortly after, Winston rents a room above a pawn shop in the less restrictive proletarian area where they continue their liaison. Julia procures contraband food and clothing on the black market, and for a brief few months they secretly meet and enjoy an idyllic life of relative freedom and contentment together.

Their affair comes to an end one evening, when the Thought Police suddenly raid the flat and arrest them both. It is later revealed that a telescreen hidden behind a picture on the wall in their room recorded their transgressions and that the elderly proprietor of the pawn shop, Mr. Charrington, is a covert agent of the Thought Police. Winston and Julia are taken away to the Ministry of Love to be detained, questioned and "rehabilitated" separately. There O'Brien, a high-ranking member of the Inner Party whom Winston had believed to be a fellow thoughtcriminal and agent of the resistance movement led by the Party's archenemy, Emmanuel Goldstein, systematically tortures him.

O'Brien instructs Winston about the state's true purpose and schools him in a kind of catechism on the principles of doublethink – the practice of holding two contradictory thoughts in the mind simultaneously. For his final rehabilitation, Winston is brought to Room 101, where O'Brien tells him he will be subjected to the "worst thing in the world", designed specifically around Smith's personal phobias. When confronted with this unbearable horror – a cage filled with wild rats – Winston's psychological resistance finally and irretrievably breaks down; he hysterically repudiates his allegiance to Julia. Seemingly subjugated and purged of any rebellious thoughts, impulses or personal attachments, Winston is restored to physical health and released.

Winston returns to the Chestnut Tree Café, where he had seen the rehabilitated thoughtcriminals Jones, Aaronson and Rutherford (themselves once prominent but later disgraced members of the Inner Party) who have since been "vaporized" and rendered unpersons. While sitting at the chess table, Winston is approached by Julia, who was similarly "rehabilitated". They share a bottle of Victory Gin and impassively exchange a few words about how they have betrayed each other. In spite of everything they have gone through, they still reaffirm their bond and express desire to see each other again. After she leaves, Winston watches a broadcast of himself on the large telescreen humbly and remorsefully confessing his "crimes" against the state and imploring forgiveness from the populace.

Upon hearing a news report declaring the Oceanian army's utter rout of Eurasia's forces in North Africa, Winston, appearing to have been deprived of his freedom to think and feel for himself and reduced to a mere shell of a man, soon to be deprived of his physical existence, looks at the still image of Big Brother that appears on the telescreen but then quickly turns away from it and looks in the direction of Julia with tears in his eyes as the words "I love you" are heard whispered in his voice.

== Cast ==
- John Hurt as Winston Smith
  - Rupert Baderman as Young Winston Smith
- Richard Burton as O'Brien
- Suzanna Hamilton as Julia
- Cyril Cusack as Mr. Charrington
- Gregor Fisher as Parsons
- James Walker as Syme
- Andrew Wilde as Tillotson
- Merelina Kendall as Mrs. Parsons
- John Boswall as Emmanuel Goldstein
- Phyllis Logan as Telescreen Announcer (voice)
- Roger Lloyd-Pack as Waiter
- Bob Flag as Big Brother (only as a still image)
- Pam Gems as the Washerwoman
- Pip Donaghy as Inner Party Speaker
- Janet Key as the Instructress
- Hugh Walters as Artsem Lecturer
- Shirley Stelfox as the Prostitute
- Matthew Scurfield and Garry Cooper as Guards
- Rolf Saxon as Patrolman

== Production ==
In the winter of 1983 the director Michael Radford asked his producer to try to obtain the rights to Orwell's novel, with low expectations that they were available. It turned out that the rights were held by Marvin Rosenblum, a lawyer in Chicago who had been trying on his own to get such a film produced. Rosenblum agreed to become an executive producer, and while the producer Simon Perry raised the production money from Richard Branson, Radford wrote the script, inspired by his idea to make a "science fiction film made in 1948". The script was finished in three weeks.

For the role of O'Brien, Paul Scofield was originally contracted to play the part, but had to withdraw after sustaining a broken leg while filming The Shooting Party. Anthony Hopkins, Sean Connery and Rod Steiger were all then considered. Richard Burton, who was living in Haiti, joined the production six weeks into its shooting schedule and insisted on his costume of a boiler suit being hand-made for him in Savile Row.

Some sources claim that principal photography began on 19 March 1984, ending later the same year in October 1984. It was released that same month, however, and a title card at the end explicitly states that it "was photographed in and around London during the period April–June 1984, the exact time and setting imagined by Orwell." The budget was originally £2.5 million, but this rose during filming and additional funds were required. The opening scenes showing the Two Minutes Hate were filmed in a grass-covered hangar at RAF Hullavington near Chippenham in Wiltshire. Some scenes set in Victory Square were also filmed at Alexandra Palace in London. Senate House (University of London) was used for exterior shots of the Ministry of Truth.

The disused Battersea Power Station in Wandsworth served as the façade for the Victory Mansions, and the Beckton Gas Works in the Docklands of Newham was used as the setting for the proletarian zones. The pawnshop exterior, a pub scene and a scene with a prostitute were filmed in Cheshire Street in the East End of London, an area Orwell had visited and commented on in his first book, Down and Out in Paris and London. The canteen interiors were filmed in a disused grain mill at Silvertown. In contrast, the idyllic, dreamlike "Golden Country", where Winston and Julia repair for their first tryst and which recurs in Winston's fantasies, was filmed in the southwest county of Wiltshire at a natural circle of hills called "Roundway", near the town of Devizes. The scenes on the train were shot on the Kent and East Sussex Railway. The film shared a number of locations with Terry Gilliam's Brazil, which was filmed the same year.

Radford and the cinematographer Roger Deakins originally wanted to shoot the film in black and white, but the financial backers of the production, Virgin Films, opposed this idea. Instead, Deakins used a film processing technique called bleach bypass to give a distinctive washed-out look to the film's color values. This technique was invented by the Japanese cinematographer Kazuo Miyagawa for Kon Ichikawa's film Her Brother (1960), in imitation of a more complicated process developed by Technicolor and Deluxe for the 1956 version of Moby Dick. The process was recreated for this production by Key. The film is a very rare example of the technique being applied to every release print, rather than the interpositive, that was struck from the original camera negative, or the internegative (struck from the interpositive); as the silver is retained in the print and cannot be reclaimed by the lab, the cost is higher, but the retained silver gives a "depth" to the projected image.

== Release and reception ==
Nineteen Eighty-Four made its theatrical debut on 10 October in London and on 14 December in New York City. It was released in the United States for one week in December 1984 at the Egyptian Theatre in Los Angeles to qualify for the 1985 Academy Awards and grossed a house record of US$62,121, despite stormy weather.

Vincent Canby of The New York Times said the film was "admirable, bleakly beautiful", although "not an easy film to watch".

Roger Ebert awarded it 3.5/4 stars, writing that it "penetrates much more deeply into the novel's heart of darkness" than previous adaptations, and describing Hurt as "the perfect Winston Smith".

The review aggregation website Rotten Tomatoes has given it a 76% approval rating, based on 33 reviews, with an average rating of 6.8/10. The site's critical consensus states:

1984 doesn't fully emerge from the shadow of its source material, but still proves a solid, suitably discomfiting adaptation of a classic dystopian tale.

Filmink called it "brilliant, incredible to look at, and emotionally devastating."

The review aggregation website Metacritic has given it a rating of 67 out of 100 based on 8 critics, indicating "generally favorable reviews".

== Score controversy ==
Virgin Films (formerly part of the Virgin Group), who financed the film, commissioned the British rock/pop duo Eurythmics to produce the music for the soundtrack after initially approaching David Bowie, who demanded a fee that Virgin deemed to be too high. Radford objected to Virgin's insistence on using the more pop-oriented electronic Eurythmics music, as the traditional orchestral score originally intended for the film had been composed entirely by Dominic Muldowney a few months earlier.

Against Radford's wishes, Virgin exercised their right of final cut and replaced Muldowney's musical cues with the new Eurythmics contributions. One Eurythmics song, "Julia", was also heard in its entirety during the film's closing credits. However, Muldowney's main theme music (particularly the state anthem, "Oceania, 'tis for thee") was still prominently used in the film.

In November 1984 Virgin Records released the Eurythmics soundtrack album, containing considerably altered versions of their music heard in the film, under the title 1984 (For the Love of Big Brother). The album reached number 23 on the UK Album Chart, and was later certified Gold by the BPI for sales in excess of 100,000 copies. A song from the album, "Sexcrime (Nineteen Eighty-Four)", was released as a single just prior to the album and became one of Eurythmics' biggest hits, peaking at number 4 and was awarded a Silver disc for sales in excess of 250,000 copies. The music video for the single made use of clips from the film. The track "Julia" was also released as a single which peaked just outside the Top 40.

Radford disowned Virgin's edit of the film containing the predominantly Eurythmics score and, during his acceptance speech at the Evening Standard British Film Awards, expressed his displeasure at Virgin's "foisting" the Eurythmics music on his film. Radford withdrew the film from consideration at the BAFTA awards in protest of Virgin's decision to change the musical score. Eurythmics responded with a statement of their own claiming no knowledge of prior agreements between Virgin and Radford/Muldowney and that they had accepted the offer to compose music for the film in good faith.

In 1999 Muldowney's complete orchestral score (24 tracks in total) was released on a special limited edition CD album under the title Nineteen Eighty-Four: The Music of Oceania, to commemorate the film's 15th anniversary. The CD booklet featured previously unseen production photographs and artwork as well as liner notes by Radford.

As of today, Metro-Goldwyn-Mayer owns the film's rights worldwide since they own both the Atlantic Releasing Corporation and the Virgin Films catalogues, and on their DVD release in North America in 2003, the film's colour is restored to a normal level of saturation and the Eurythmics contributions to the score were removed entirely and replaced with Muldowney's musical cues as Radford had originally intended—although both Eurythmics and Muldowney are still jointly credited in the opening and closing titles. This DVD release was quickly discontinued and currently remains out of print. This version had previously been shown by Channel 4 in the UK in the late 1980s. However, while the MGM DVD release of the film in the UK in 2004 features the desaturated visuals, it has the mixed Eurythmics/Muldowney soundtrack on the English- and French-language audio tracks, but the purely Muldowney soundtrack on the German- and Spanish-language audio tracks.

In 2013 the film was re-released on DVD in North America by TGG Direct on a double feature with Megaville (1990), under licence from MGM. This DVD release also features the original mix of Eurythmics/Muldowney soundtracks, as well as the theatrical desaturated colour palette. In 2015 the film was released on Blu-ray in North America by Twilight Time in a limited 3,000 copy run, again, licensed by MGM. This release features the Eurythmics/Muldowney Soundtrack on one audio channel and Muldowney's orchestral score on another, as well as keeping true to the original colour scheme.

The version of the film which has been released on digital download services is the 2015 HD edition. It is available only with the original Eurythmics/Muldowney soundtrack.

The 2019 Criterion Collection release of the film features the original colour scheme (with a transfer supervised by the cinematographer Roger Deakins) and includes both the Eurythmics soundtrack and the original score composed by Dominic Muldowney.

== Awards ==
It won the Best British Film of the Year award at the Evening Standard British Film Awards. It also won The Golden Tulip Award at the 1985 Istanbul International Film Festival.

== Home media ==
International Video Entertainment paid US$2 million for North American home video rights, the fifth-biggest deal ever at the time. Their initial VHS & Betamax releases came out in 1985, with a later release in 1989. Avid Home Entertainment released it on VHS in 1990 and again in 1994. In between the Avid releases, GoodTimes Home Video released a VHS in LP mode in 1992. After acquiring ITC Entertainment Group, PolyGram Video released their VHS in conjunction with Sundance Channel in 1996.

In 2003 MGM Home Entertainment released it on DVD in North America and in the UK a year later; the American DVD only contains Muldowney's score while the UK DVD contains the mix of his and Eurythmics' soundtrack. TGG Direct re-released it on DVD in 2013 as a double feature with Megaville. It has been released on Blu-ray twice, first by Twilight Time in 2015 as a limited 3,000-copy run and by The Criterion Collection in 2019. Both of these editions contain both the original theatrical Eurythmics score and the alternate Muldowney score.

In 2024 it was released on 4K Blu-ray in Germany and Hungary.

== See also ==
- Adaptations of Nineteen Eighty-Four
- Nineteen Eighty-Four in popular media
- List of films featuring surveillance
