= Gangrel (disambiguation) =

Gangrel, ring name of American professional wrestler David Heath

Gangrel may refer to:

- Gangrel (magazine), a British literary magazine of the 1940s
- A fictional clan of vampires in the role-playing game Vampire: The Masquerade
- The former king of the nation of Plegia in Fire Emblem Awakening.
