= Sex crime (disambiguation) =

A sex crime is a crime of a sexual nature. See Sex and the law.

Sex crime may also refer to:

- Sexcrime (1984), a newspeak word used in the novel Nineteen Eighty-Four
- "Sexcrime (Nineteen Eighty-Four)" (song), a 1984 song by Eurythmics
