= Lewis Namier =

Polish-born British historian (1888–1960)

Sir Lewis Namier
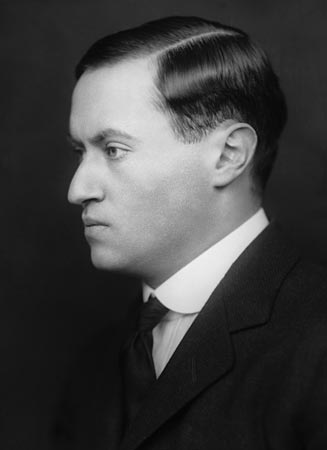
- Namier in 1915
- Born: Ludwik Bernstein Niemirowski; 27 June 1888; Wola Okrzejska, Congress Poland
- Died: 19 August 1960 (aged 72)
- Occupations: Historian, diplomat
- Spouse: Julia de Beausobre (m. 1927)

Academic background
- Education: University of Lwów; University of Lausanne; London School of Economics; Balliol College, Oxford
- Influences: Vilfredo Pareto

Academic work
- Institutions: Balliol College, Oxford; University of Manchester
- Notable works: The Structure of Politics at the Accession of George III (1929); England in the Age of the American Revolution (1930); History of Parliament series (from 1940)

Sir Lewis Bernstein Namier (/ˈneɪmiər/, born Ludwik Bernstein Niemirowski; 27 June 1888 – 19 August 1960) was a Polish-born British historian. His best-known works were The Structure of Politics at the Accession of George III (1929), England in the Age of the American Revolution (1930) and the History of Parliament series (begun 1940) he edited later in his life with John Brooke.

== Life ==
Namier was born Ludwik Bernstein Niemirowski in Wola Okrzejska in the Russian-controlled Congress Poland, now part of the Lublin Voivodeship of southeastern Poland, although his family moved to the Austrian Partition in 1890. His family were secular-minded Polish-Jewish gentry. His father, with whom young Lewis often quarreled, idolized the Austro-Hungarian Empire. By contrast, Namier throughout his life detested it. Before coming to England he was educated at the University of Lwów in Austrian Galicia (now in Ukraine) and the University of Lausanne. At Lausanne, Namier heard Vilfredo Pareto lecture, and Pareto's ideas about elites would have a great influence on his thinking.

Namier emigrated to the United Kingdom in 1907, studied first at the London School of Economics for a year and then at Balliol College, Oxford, from 1908, taking a first in modern history in 1911. Namier became a British subject in 1913, whereupon he anglicised his name.

During the First World War, he fought as a private with the 20th Royal Fusiliers in 1914–15 but was discharged owing to poor eyesight. He then held positions with the Propaganda Department (1915–17), the Department of Information (1917–18) and finally with the Political Intelligence Department of the Foreign Office (1918–20).

=== Professional career ===
Following the defeat of Germany in World War I, Namier joined the British delegation at the 1919 Versailles Peace Conference. Based on his personal background, Namier maintained a firm personal interest in Russian affairs; however, he was also seen as one of the biggest enemies of the newly-independent Polish state in the British political environment. During the Polish–Soviet War his relationship with the Polish delegation was highly antagonistic and his attitude towards Poland and Polish territories openly hostile. Namier was later accused of changing the British proposal – the "Curzon Line" – for the eastern border of Poland by leaving the city of Lviv (in Polish, Lwów) and the Oil Basin on the eastern side when the British Foreign Office sent a cable to the Commissar for Foreign Affairs of Bolshevik Russia, Georgy Chicherin.

The Polish delegation had no knowledge of the existence of Line "A" whatsoever since the idea of handing Lwów over to the Bolsheviks was rejected by prime minister Władysław Grabski at the very beginning of talks. Lwów had never been under the rule of Moscow in its history.

Professor Piotr Eberhardt from the Polish Academy of Sciences speculates that Lloyd George could have been aware of Namier's modification; Bartłomiej Rusin refutes the claims that Namier was responsible and calls him "merely a convenient supplier of anti‑Polish arguments".

The earlier-approved compromised version of the Curzon Line which was approved at the Spa Conference in Belgium was renamed by Namier as Curzon Line "B". Chicherin relayed this document to Lenin who rejected it nevertheless, assured of his victory over Poland followed by a planned annexation of its entire territory.

In one of his memoranda Namier falsified the results of a national census from Eastern Galicia originating from Austria-Hungary. He single-handedly reduced the number of ethnic Poles living in the region from 2 million down to 600.000–700.000 inhabitants. Professor Anna M. Cienciala believes that Namier was not the original initiator of this misrepresentation, but merely an unscrupulous supplier of handy arguments for the anti-Polish lobby among the Entente members.

After leaving government service, Namier taught at Balliol (1920–21) before going into business for himself. Later Namier, who was a long-time Zionist, worked as political secretary for the Jewish Agency in Palestine (1929–31). For a time he was a close friend and associate of Chaim Weizmann, but Weizmann later severed relations with Namier when the latter converted to Anglicanism to marry his second wife.

Namier served as professor at the University of Manchester from 1931 until his retirement in 1953, having been loudly cheered by his students at the conclusion of his last lecture there on European History. Namier remained active in various Zionist groups (in particular, lobbying the British government to allow the creation of what he called a Jewish Fighting Force in the Mandate of Palestine) and from 1933 was engaged in efforts on behalf of Jewish refugees from Germany.

He was married twice and knighted in 1952 at the onset of Cold War. Also in 1952, Namier was given the honour of delivering the Romanes Lecture, on which subject Namier chose Monarchy and the Party System.

== Personal life ==
In 1917, Namier married a Russian refugee, Clara Sophia Edeleff-Poniatowska, although they separated in 1921. He was by this time estranged from his father so that when his father died in 1922 the family estate was left to Namier's sister. In 1940 when he feared a Nazi invasion of Britain he burned a large number of his papers and arranged to commit suicide.

In 1945, his first wife died. In 1947, he married writer Julia de Beausobre (born Iulia Michaelovna Kazarina), who authored a biography of him after his death. To marry Julia, who was a convinced Christian, he converted to Anglicanism which led to an estrangement with Chaim Weizmann.

His sister, Teodora Niemirowska, was the mother of Anna Kurska.

== Political views ==
Namier is best known for his work on the Parliament of Great Britain, in particular English politics in the 1760s. His principal conclusion of that decade was that there was no risk of an authoritarian disposal of British parliamentarism. By way of its very detailed study of individuals, this course of study caused substantial revision to accounts based on a party system. Namier's best-known works were The Structure of Politics at the Accession of George III, England in the Age of the American Revolution and the History of Parliament series he edited later in his life with John Brooke.

Namier used prosopography or collective biography of every Member of Parliament (MP) and peer who sat in the British Parliament in the latter 18th century to reveal that local interests, not national ones, often determined how parliamentarians voted. Namier argued very strongly that far from being tightly organised groups, both the Tories and Whigs were collections of ever-shifting and fluid small groups whose stances altered on an issue-by-issue basis. Namier felt that prosopographical methods were the best for analysing small groups like the House of Commons, but he was opposed to the application of prosopography to larger groups. At the time of its publication in 1929, The Structure of Politics at the Accession of George III caused a historiographical revolution in understanding the 18th century.

"What Namier's minutely detailed studies revealed was the fact that politics in 1760 consisted mainly in the jockeying for position and influence by individuals within the political elite" rather than ideas such as liberty or democracy, or rivalry with foreign kings, or social effects of industrial and technological change. "Spending many years himself, off and on, in psychoanalysis, [Namier] believed that the "deep-seated drives and emotions" of the individual were what explained politics", wrote Richard J. Evans on 29 November 2019, reviewing Conservative Revolutionary: the lives of Lewis Namier (Manchester University Press, 2019), a new biography by D. W. Hayton (a participant in the History of Parliament project).

=== Controversies ===
Namier used sources such as wills and tax records to reveal the interests of the MPs. In his time, his methods were new and quite controversial. His obsession with collecting facts such as club membership of various MPs and then attempting to correlate them with voting patterns led his critics to accuse him of "taking ideas out of history". Namier has been described by the historian Lawrence Stone as a member of an 'elitist school' with a 'deeply pessimistic attitude toward human affairs'.

His biographer John Cannon concludes:

Namier's achievements were greatly praised during his lifetime and unduly disparaged subsequently. On his chosen ground, the accession of George III, he made important and probably irreversible corrections to the traditional whiggish account....Later on Namier was not so much repudiated as outflanked, by critics who pointed to the narrowness of his concerns, and his lack of interest in anything but political history. The technique of structural analysis, with which his name was inextricably linked as 'Namierism', offered, in his view, an escape from voluminous narrative....[but] its limitations are very evident. There are great swathes of history where, for lack of evidence, structural analysis can hardly be applied. Even where it can, there is no guarantee that it will, in itself, generate interesting and important questions.

=== Diplomatic history controversies ===
As a former patient of Sigmund Freud, Namier was a believer in psychohistory. He also wrote on modern European history, especially diplomatic history and his later books Europe in Decay, In the Nazi Era and Diplomatic Prelude unsparingly condemned the Third Reich and appeasement. In the 1930s, Namier had been active in the anti-appeasement movement and together with his protégé A. J. P. Taylor spoke out against the Munich Agreement at several rallies in 1938. In the early 1950s, Namier had a celebrated debate on the pages of the Times Literary Supplement with the former French foreign minister Georges Bonnet.

At issue was the question whether Bonnet had, as Namier charged, snubbed an offer by the Polish foreign minister Colonel Józef Beck in May 1938 to have Poland come to the aid of Czechoslovakia in the event of a German attack. Bonnet denied that such an offer had been made, which led Namier to accuse Bonnet of seeking to falsify the record.

Namier concluded the debate in 1953 with words "The Polish offer, for what it was worth, was first torpedoed by Bonnet the statesmen, and next obliterated by Bonnet the historian".

Namier's writings on German history have been criticised for being influenced by Germanophobia. His hatred of Germany was legendary; Namier himself wrote in 1942 as the war raged on: "it did not require either 1914, or 1933, or 1939 to teach me the truth about the Germans. Long before the last war I considered them a deadly menace to Europe and the civilisation."

Like the work of his friend Sir John Wheeler-Bennett, Namier's diplomatic histories are generally poorly regarded by modern historians because he was content to condemn appeasement without seeking to explain the reasons for it; and eager to dismiss political principles as rhetorical posturing.

== Works ==
Cold War era

- The House of Commons, 1754–1790 (3 vols.), 1966 [1964], edited by John Brooke & Sir Lewis Namier.
- Crossroads of Power: Essays on Eighteenth-Century England, 1962.
- Charles Townshend, His Character and Career, Leslie Stephen Lecture, Cambridge University Press, 1959.
- Vanished Supremacies: Essays on European History, 1812–1918, 1958.
- Personalities and Powers, 1955.
- Basic Factors in Nineteenth-Century European History, 1953.
- Monarchy and the Party System: The Romanes Lecture Delivered in the Sheldonian Theatre 15 May 1952, 1952.
- In the Nazi Era, 1952.
- Avenues of History, 1952.
- Europe in Decay: A Study in Disintegration, 1936–1940, 1950.
- Diplomatic Prelude, 1938–1939, 1948.
- Facing East: Essays on Germany, the Balkans and Russia in the Twentieth Century, 1947.

World War II period

- 1848: The Revolution of the Intellectuals, 1944.
- Conflicts: Studies in Contemporary History, 1942.
- In the Margin of History, 1939.

Interwar years

- Skyscrapers and other Essays, 1931. Contains his essays on Austrian Galicia.
- England in the Age of the American Revolution, 1930.
- The Structure of Politics at the Accession of George III, 1929, 1957.
