= Telescreen =

Fictional device used in the novel 1984

A telescreen is a two-way video device that appears in George Orwell's 1949 dystopian novel Nineteen Eighty-Four. It is a medium that dominates the fictional totalitarian society of Oceania, being present in public and private spaces. Omnipresent and almost never turned off, it is an unavoidable source of propaganda and tool of surveillance used by the ruling Party to manipulate and control the Oceanian population.

The concept of the telescreen has been explored as a metaphor or allegory for the erosion of privacy in totalitarian regimes, as well as in the modern era in the context of Internet- and cellular-based devices that allow for the surreptitious collection of individuals' audiovisual data, frequently without their explicit consent or awareness.

== Role in Nineteen Eighty-Four ==
In the dystopian novel Nineteen Eighty-Four, the telescreen is a two-way video device that is used by the ruling party of Oceania to control and manipulate its citizens. It is described by George Orwell as "an oblong metal plaque like a dulled mirror" that receives and transmits simultaneously. The telescreen is ubiquitous within the totalitarian society of Oceania, being a dominating presence both in the private homes and in the work places of individuals. The daily actions of Winston Smith, the protagonist of the novel, are monitored through the telescreen, which is not only used by the Party as a tool of surveillance but also as a mechanism for dictating his strict daily routine: "The telescreen struck fourteen. He must leave in ten minutes. He had to be back at work by fourteen-thirty."

As a broadcasting device, the telescreen punctuates Winston's day with routine activities, such as an exercise routine called the "Physical Jerks" and the "Two Minutes Hate", a daily broadcast used for the purposes of propaganda, in which participants respond to the telescreen by shouting their hatred for the enemy of the state, Emmanuel Goldstein, and declaring their devotion to the Party leader, Big Brother. The telescreen also broadcasts falsified news about the Party's successes. Winston describes an announcement from the Ministry of Plenty: "The fabulous statistics continued to pour out of the telescreen. As compared with last year there was more food, more clothes, more houses, more furniture, more cooking pots, more fuel, more ships, more helicopters, more books, more babies—more of everything except disease, crime, and insanity."

The telescreen is predominantly used as a form of surveillance on the Outer Party, of which Winston is a member. Unlike the luxurious existence of the Inner Party, the lifestyle of Outer Party members is meagre. Every apartment is fitted with a telescreen that can never be switched off but only the volume can be adjusted. As a tool of surveillance, the telescreen is an effective form of control due to its psychological impact on individuals. Winston is aware that he is being watched whenever he is in the sight of the telescreen and this is occasionally confirmed by a voice speaking through the telescreen. Orwell writes: "You had to live— did live, from habit that became instinct—in the assumption that every sound you made was overheard, and, except in darkness, every movement scrutinized." The telescreen is able to track sounds at low levels, so that even the slightest whisper can be heard. It can also detect subtle facial movements that reveal individual emotions, which could be monitored by the Thought Police at any moment. Individuals are expected to convey an expression of optimism when in sight of a telescreen and always give their full attention to its broadcasts.

Although telescreens dominate the homes of Party members and public places, there are various locations in the novel where they are not present, such as in an antique shop whose owner states that he cannot afford it. Despite being the predominant form of surveillance, it is people, such as O'Brien or the children of Winston's neighbours who betray their father, who perform surveillance of Oceania's citizens in secret.

Oceanian society uses screens, including the telescreen and cinema screen, as a method of enforcing conformity in its population. By monitoring every aspect of an individual's private life through the telescreen, while also controlling history through propaganda, the ruling party is able to control critical thought. The population is so conditioned to Party propaganda, that gory images of war are received by cinema audiences with enthusiasm.

== Background ==
Jeff Prucher listed the first use of the term, as tele-screen, in a short story by F. Flagg, After Armageddon, in Wonder Stories in 1932.

At the time of Orwell's writing of Nineteen Eighty-Four from 1947 to 1948, television was an emerging technology rather than a mass medium and the first surveillance cameras only began to be sold in the United States in 1949, shortly after the publication of the novel. Orwell's concept for the telescreen predicted the widespread distribution of screens.

According to the Canadian literary scholar Thomas Dilworth, Orwell's telescreen could have been inspired by the film Modern Times directed by Charlie Chaplin, in which the president of Electro Steel Corp. uses a wall screen device to monitor production and also give orders to his workers. Dilworth noted that the theme of using subliminal messaging through the telescreen is also reminiscent of the theme of using hypnopaedia on children in Aldous Huxley's Brave New World.

Marie-Claire Rouyer noted that the concept of mass surveillance in Orwell's creation of the telescreen was reminiscent of a design by philosopher Jeremy Bentham of the panopticon – a prison whose design would allow the prison guards to observe all prisoners, without them knowing if they are being watched.

== Analysis ==
Orwell's use of the telescreen was described as "obsessive" by Mario Varricchio, who commented that the novel clearly positions the telescreen as the most important device for maintaining a police state. The first part of the novel is dominated by the presence of the telescreen and it is repeatedly mentioned by Orwell as an instrument for spying on the masses and as a method of manipulation rather than as a device for recreational viewing.

Telescreens have been described as an allegory or metaphor for informers in communist countries or, more broadly, of the loss of privacy in totalitarian states. Gorman Beauchamp commented that the telescreens in Nineteen Eighty-Four only project the fantasy of totalitarian control rather than the reality. The telescreen was a concept based on the technology of Orwell's era that could only serve as a guide in predicting the future. In 1939, Orwell wrote, "The Inquisition failed, but then the Inquisition had not the resources of the modern state. The radio, press-censorship, standardized education and the secret police have altered everything. Mass-suggestion is a science of the last twenty years, and we do not know how successful it will be." Beauchamp stated that the telescreen therefore is a "quantum leap in the technology of tyranny".

Peter Huber noted that for Orwell, electronic media is ugly, oppressive and mind-numbing, and that Orwell believed that it would significantly empower those in power to spy on citizens. Huber disagreed with Orwell's argument, claiming that progress in the field of communication technology, including the Internet, is progress towards freedom, and that freedom of society increases with the development and popularity of these technologies. Richard A. Posner writes that Orwell approached technology too pessimistically, stating that this medium became an educational tool reducing the elite's monopoly of power. Lawrence Lessig argued that the telescreen is less intrusive than today's Internet; similarly, David Brin writes that privacy erosion cannot be stopped, but can be counterbalanced by a double telescreen basis, where those who monitor people can also be monitored.

== Comparisons ==
The telescreen has been compared to a television surveillance system, TV sets controlled by voice commands that collect data (both actual commands and private conversations) for analysis on servers, modern cellphones, and other devices that allow people to collect audiovisual data, including the Internet.

== In other media ==
Telescreens appear in Equilibrium (2002) an American science fiction film directed by Kurt Wimmer, where their use is as a reference to Orwell's work.

== See also ==
- Talking CCTV
- Videotelephony
