= 1984 (For the Love of Big Brother) =

Soundtrack album by Eurythmics
- Released: 12 November 1984
- Recorded: August 1984
- Genres: New wave; synth-pop; electronica; avant-garde
- Length: 39:03
- Label: Virgin
- Producer: David A. Stewart

Eurythmics chronology
Touch Dance (1984)	1984 (For the Love of Big Brother) (1984)	Be Yourself Tonight (1985)

Singles from 1984 (For the Love of Big Brother)
- 1. "Sexcrime (Nineteen Eighty-Four)" Released: 22 October 1984; 2. "Julia" Released: 7 January 1985

Professional ratings
Review scores
Source	Rating
AllMusic	2/5 stars
Smash Hits	9/10

1984 (For the Love of Big Brother) is a soundtrack album by the British pop duo Eurythmics. Released on 12 November 1984 by Virgin Records, it was the duo's fourth album overall and contains music recorded by Eurythmics for the film Nineteen Eighty-Four, based on George Orwell's dystopian novel of the same name. Virgin Films produced the film for release in its namesake year, and commissioned Eurythmics to compose a soundtrack.

== Background ==
=== Recording ===
Richard Branson approached Eurythmics about recording a soundtrack for the film Nineteen Eighty-Four. The duo worked on the album in Nassau, The Bahamas after the conclusion of a US tour. Dave Stewart commented that they were "very excited" about working on the soundtrack for Nineteen Eighty-Four and found the premise of the storyline more compelling than some of the other movie scores that they were asked to work on. The band had been asked to compose other movie scores in the past, which they opted not to pursue.

Stewart and Annie Lennox worked purely as a duo for these recordings, with no contributions from other musicians. The music continued in the predominantly electronic style that Eurythmics had found great success with since 1983, but was far more experimental with several tracks being instrumentals and some (most notably the hit single "Sexcrime") employing the use of sampling. Stewart himself described some tracks as "Kraftwerk meets African tribal meets Booker T. & the M.G.'s."

Unknown to the group, Michael Radford, the film's director, had commissioned his own orchestral score and was not fond of Eurythmics' work. Two versions of the film were released, one featuring Eurythmics' music, and the "director's cut", which replaced most of Eurythmics' music by the orchestral score. When accepting an award for the film, Radford publicly complained of having Eurythmics' music "foisted" on him. Eurythmics issued a statement saying that they had accepted Virgin's commission in good faith, and would never have done so if they had known that it was not being done with the director's approval.

=== Musical concept ===
Most of the tracks are instrumental, with song titles and lyrics being derived from Orwell's text. For instance, "I Did It Just The Same" is taken from a passage in the book where the protagonist, Winston Smith, relates how he committed "sexcrime" with a prostitute—initially deceived by her makeup, when he got close to her, he realised she was "about fifty—but I did it just the same". "Julia" was the name of the secondary protagonist and Winston's lover. "Sexcrime" and "Doubleplusgood" are examples of Newspeak, the government-imposed revision of the English language in Orwell's story. The track "Doubleplusgood" features a female announcer—the voice of the omnipresent Telescreen in the movie—reading out various memos which Winston had received at his job in the Ministry of Truth, where his role was to amend past and present newspaper articles so that they conformed to current Party dogma. The "Ministry of Love" was the government police and torture department, and included "Room 101", a room which contained "the worst thing in the world"—i.e. where each torture victim would be confronted with their own worst nightmare.

=== Release ===
The album was released by Virgin Records in the UK and RCA Records in the US. Two singles were released from the album, "Sexcrime (Nineteen Eighty-Four)" and "Julia". The first was a top-10 hit in most territories, while the largely a capella track "Julia" achieved little commercial success and broke the duo's run of six consecutive top-10 singles in the UK when it peaked at number 44. Promotional videos were produced for both singles.

One US LP release had an additional sticker that stated "Censored by the thought police".

== Track listing ==
All tracks are written by Annie Lennox and David A. Stewart. The album credits have the order flipped on tracks 2, 4, 6 and 8, which are listed as "Stewart/Lennox".

No.	Title	Length
1.	"I Did It Just the Same"	3:28
2.	"Sexcrime (Nineteen Eighty-Four)"	3:58
3.	"For the Love of Big Brother"	5:05
4.	"Winston's Diary"	1:22
5.	"Greetings from a Dead Man"	6:13
6.	"Julia"	6:40
7.	"Doubleplusgood"	4:40
8.	"Ministry of Love"	3:47
9.	"Room 101"	3:50

== Personnel ==
Credits adapted from the liner notes of 1984 (For the Love of Big Brother).

- David A. Stewart – production, mixing
- Eric "ET" Thorngren – engineering, mixing
- Sean Burrows – engineering assistance
- Steven Stanley – early recording engineering (tracks 2, 3)
- Sarah Quill – front cover photo
- Howard Brown – 1984 logo
- Mighty – sleeve

== Charts ==
=== Weekly charts ===
Weekly chart performance for 1984 (For the Love of Big Brother)
Chart (1985)	Peak position
Australian Albums (Kent Music Report)	22
Canada Top Albums/CDs (RPM)	33
Dutch Albums (Album Top 100)	38
European Albums (Music & Media)	12
German Albums (Offizielle Top 100)	23
New Zealand Albums (RMNZ)	21
Swedish Albums (Sverigetopplistan)	6
Swiss Albums (Schweizer Hitparade)	18
UK Albums (Official Charts)	23
US Billboard 200	93

=== Year-end charts ===
Year-end chart performance for 1984 (For the Love of Big Brother)
Chart (1984)	Position
UK Albums (Gallup)	100

== Certifications ==
Certifications for 1984 (For the Love of Big Brother)
Region	Certification	Certified units/sales
Canada (Music Canada)	Gold	50,000^{^}
United Kingdom (BPI)	Gold	100,000^{^}
^{^} Shipments figures based on certification alone.
