= Star Begotten =

1937 novel by Herbert George Wells

- First edition (publ. Chatto & Windus); Cover art by Harold Jones.
- Author: H. G. Wells
- Language: English
- Publisher: Chatto & Windus
- Publication date: 1937

Star Begotten is a 1937 science fiction novel by English author H. G. Wells (1866-1946). It tells the story of a series of men who conjecture upon the possibility of the human race being genetically modified by Martians to replace their own dying planet, beginning with Joseph Davis, an author of popular histories, who suspects that he and his family have already been exposed and are starting to change.

The first (British) edition of this novel gives the title as two words: Star Begotten. The title is hyphenated in the first U.S. edition: Star-Begotten.

The book revisits the idea of the interaction of humans with Martians, which Wells had first (and famously) presented in The War of the Worlds (1898). The dialogue of Star Begotten makes brief references to Wells' earlier novel, referring to it as having been written by "Jules Verne, Conan Doyle, one of those fellows", as well as the concept of Big Brother, later written into George Orwell's Nineteen Eighty-Four (1949).

== In other works ==
At the end of Sherlock Holmes's War of the Worlds (1975), Professor Challenger indicates that the "Martians" (not really from Mars in the story) from The War of the Worlds are the same Martians from Star Begotten, and hints at the start of the Martian alteration program. It is possible that John Wyndham's The Midwich Cuckoos (1957), adapted as Village of the Damned in 1960, was similarly influenced by Star Begotten.

In Nigel Kneale's 1958-59 BBC television serial Quatermass and the Pit and its 1967 movie adaptation, a discovery of strange fossils reveals that human evolution was altered by a dying race of Martians, in order to leave a legacy behind. This may have been inspired by the tale of H. G. Wells.
