= Julia (Eurythmics song) =

Single by Eurythmics

from the album 1984 (For the Love of Big Brother)
- B-side: "Ministry of Love"
- Released: 7 January 1985
- Recorded: 1984
- Genre: New wave, synthpop
- Length: 4:05 (single version); 6:37 (album version)
- Label: Virgin Records (UK); RCA Records (US)
- Songwriters: Annie Lennox, David A. Stewart
- Producer: David A. Stewart

Eurythmics singles chronology
"Sexcrime (Nineteen Eighty-Four)" (1984)	"Julia" (1985)	"Would I Lie to You?" (1985)

Music video
- "Julia" on YouTube

"Julia" is a song performed by British pop duo Eurythmics. Written by group members Annie Lennox and David A. Stewart and produced by Stewart, the song was the second and final single released from their album 1984 (For the Love of Big Brother), which served as the soundtrack to the film Nineteen Eighty-Four, an adaptation of George Orwell's political novel of the same name. It plays during the film's ending credits.

== Background ==
The song is a ballad with very sparse electronic instrumentation and an almost a cappella performance by Lennox. Her vocals are accentuated by vocoder effects in the background. The title and lyric of the song are based upon the novel's heroine and love interest, Julia. The cover artwork for the single is a still image from the film, featuring English actress Suzanna Hamilton as Julia. Midway through the song, an instrumental line based on J. S. Bach's "Fugue #2 in C Minor" from The Well Tempered Clavier, Book 1, can be heard.

The version of "Julia" found on the soundtrack differs from the one being played during the end-credits of the film - which is more string based with less synthetic arrangements. This is also the case for many of the other songs on the soundtrack versus their version used in the film.

== Reception ==
Cash Box said the song is "a dreamy and ethereal piece which is almost exclusively Lennox’s airy vocals and David Stewart’s synthesizer meanderings". Jerry Smith of Music Week called it a "bleak track" and a "simple ballad with deep sombre synths". He thought that Lennox's vocals was the only highlight of the song and that it would be "hard pressed to follow the success of the previous single Sex Crime".

Breaking a string of six consecutive top 10 hits, "Julia" peaked at number 44 on the UK singles chart.

== Music video ==
The music video for Julia was directed by Chris Ashbrook (who had directed the previous promo for Sexcrime) and was filmed towards the end of 1984. The video, which consists of a bare-shouldered closeup of Lennox's face whilst she sings, was later included on the VHS/DVD Eurythmics Greatest Hits, even though the song itself was not included on the compilation album of the same name.

== Track listings ==
7"

- A: "Julia" [edited]
- B: "Ministry of Love"

12"

- A: "Julia" (extended mix) *
- B: "Ministry of Love" (extended)

* this version although labelled as "extended" is the same as the one found on the album 1984 (For the Love of Big Brother)

== Charts ==
Chart performance for "Julia"
Chart (1985)	Peak position
Europe (European Top 100 Singles)	97
Ireland (IRMA)	17
UK Singles (OCC)	44
