= Talking CCTV =

Surveillance camera with a speaker

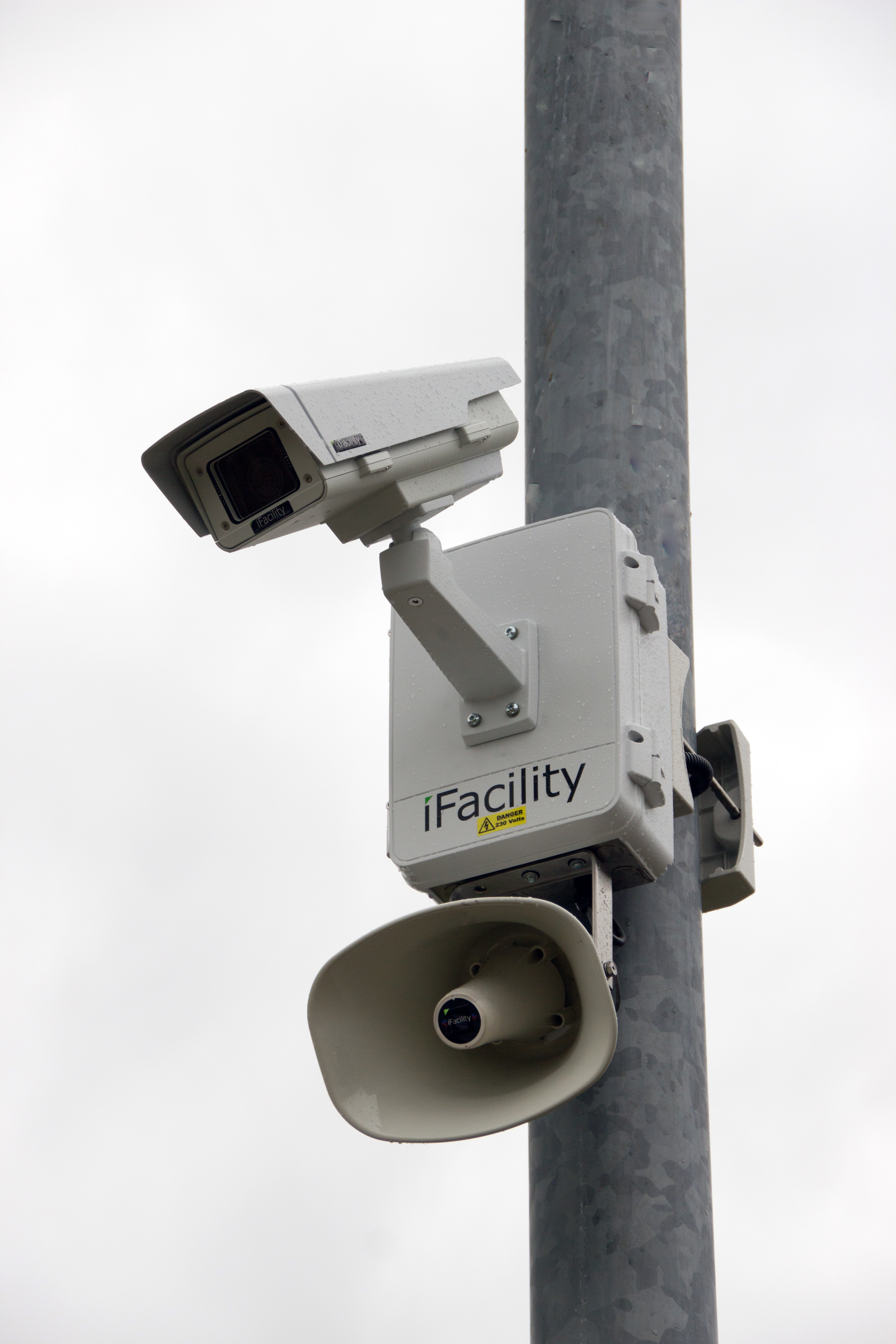
A CCTV camera with speakers attached

Talking CCTV is a CCTV surveillance camera that is equipped with a speaker to allow an operator to speak to the people at the CCTV-monitored site.

John Reid, Home Secretary, claimed, "the new funding for Talking CCTV is aimed at the small minority who think it is acceptable to litter our streets, vandalise our communities and damage our properties", as he gave grants of £500,000 to 21 areas (Note: Grants were given to Southwark, Barking and Dagenham, Reading, Thanet, Harlow, Norwich, Ipswich, Plymouth, Gloucester, Derby, Northampton, Mansfield, Nottingham, Coventry, Sandwell, Wirral, Blackpool, Salford, Middlesbrough, South Tyneside and Darlington.) for the implementation of the "Talking CCTV" camera.

Systems in Middlesbrough, West Bromwich, Redbridge, Manchester and Nottingham were implemented by Complus Teltronic Ltd using switching, telemetry and control room interfacing control systems from Synectic Systems Group Ltd.

== History ==
In Wiltshire, UK, 2003, a pilot scheme for what is now known as "Talking CCTV" was put into action; allowing operators of CCTV cameras to order offenders to stop what they were doing, ranging from ordering subjects to pick up their rubbish and put it in a bin to ordering groups of vandals to disperse. In 2005 Ray Mallon, the mayor and former senior police officer of Middlesbrough implemented "Talking CCTV" in his area.

Other towns have had such cameras installed. In 2007 several of the devices were installed in Bridlington town centre, East Riding of Yorkshire.

== Criticism ==
The cameras were described by critics as "Big Brother gone mad".

In April 2007, Middlesbrough council apologised to a woman for mistakenly thinking she had dropped a wrapper and instructing her through a Talking CCTV camera to put it in the bin.

== In popular culture ==
The Simpsons episode "To Surveil with Love" was based around the idea of communicative CCTV.

== See also ==
- Giant Voice System
