= James Walker (actor) =

English actor (1940–2017)

- Born: 31 March 1940; Bournemouth, England
- Died: 28 February 2017 (aged 76)
- Education: Trinity College, Oxford - 1961
- Occupation: Actor

James Walker (31 March 1940 – 28 February 2017) was an English actor active in films and on television between 1980 and 2006. His career highlights included a season between 1992 and 1994 with the Royal Shakespeare Company in Stratford-upon-Avon – including a foreign tour with The Winter's Tale – and taking the role of Albert Einstein in Terry Johnson's play Insignificance, in Harrogate in 1999.

== Personal life ==
Walker was born James S. Chalton in Bournemouth, and was later brought up in Leeds in Yorkshire. He was the son of Stuart Chalton, a chartered accountant, and his wife, Alice, known as Molly (née Walker). James later took his mother's maiden name as a stage name. He was educated at Sedbergh School and thereafter at Trinity College, Oxford, to study modern languages, graduating in 1961. He met his wife, Sandra, having been introduced by friends and they married in London in 1986.

== Career ==
James appeared in TV serials including The Secret Adversary, Fairly Secret Army, Howards' Way, Inspector Morse, and The Shell Seekers.

He also had roles in films including Nineteen Eighty-Four, Danny the Champion of the World, and Red Sun Rising.

== Death ==
He died on 28 February 2017, at age 76.

== Filmography ==
Year	Title	Role	Notes
1984	Nineteen Eighty-Four	Syme	
1987	Empire of the Sun	Mr. Radik	
1989	Danny the Champion of the World	Vicar	TV movie
1991	9 1/2 Ninjas!	Bum	
1994	Red Sun Rising	Iceman	
1996	Twelfth Night: Or What You Will	Priest	
