= Lillian Feder =

American academic

Lillian Feder (July 10, 1923 – January 12, 2007) was an American academic. She was Professor of English and Comparative Literature at Queens College and an emerita professor of the Graduate Center, CUNY, in comparative literature.

Feder was born in New York City and earned her PhD from the University of Minnesota. She published journal articles on solipsism in modern man and on selfhood in literature.

She died on Jan. 12, 2007, in hospice in Stuart, Florida; she had lived in nearby Jensen Beach for five years.

== Publications ==
- Crowell's Handbook of Classical Literature (New York: Crowell, 1964)
- Madness in Literature, 1980 (Princeton UP, 1983)
- Ancient Myth in Modern Poetry (Princeton UP)
- Naipaul's Truth: The Making of a Writer
