= John Brooke (British historian) =

British historian (1920–1985)

John Brooke (4 May 1920 – 1985) was a British historian. He studied history at the Victoria University of Manchester under Lewis Namier and, in 1951, became Namier's principal assistant for the History of Parliament. When Namier died in 1960, Brooke succeeded him as editor of the section dealing with 1754 to 1790. From 1964, he was Senior Editor of the Royal Commission on Historical Manuscripts. He was co-author with Namier of a biography of Charles Townshend, and author of The Chatham Administration, a study of politics in the early years of George III's reign. He was also the author of a leading biography of King George III, published in 1972. Brooke died in 1985.

== Bibliography ==
- The Chatham Administration 1766–1768, 1956.
- The House of Commons, 1754–1790, 1966, 1964, edited by John Brooke & Sir Lewis Namier.
- King George III, 1972. First published by Constable (London) in 1972 with a foreword by HRH Prince of Wales.
- Joint author with Sir Lewis Namier on biography of Charles Townshend (1964).
- Joint author with Kristian Quinn on a biography of Richard Cromwell (1948)
