= Gangrel (magazine) =

Gangrel was a short-lived quarterly literary magazine published in the United Kingdom. It was edited by J. B. Pick and Charles Neill.

== History and profile ==
The first issue of Gangrel appeared in October 1945. The magazine was based in London and was published on a quarterly basis. Running to a total of four issues between 1945 and 1946, it included articles by Alfred Perles, Henry Miller, Robert Simpson, Neil M. Gunn, Rayner Heppenstall and George Orwell, as well as poems by Lawrence Durrell, R. S. Thomas, James Kirkup and Kenneth Patchen.

Orwell's famous essay "Why I Write" appeared in the last issue (Summer 1946). The title is a Scottish word meaning vagrant. The magazine sold for 1s.9d. and carried articles on literature, poetry, music, and philosophy.
