= David M. Lubin =

American writer and academic

- Born: November 24, 1950 (age 75); Columbus, Ohio, U.S.
- Education: B.A. (Ohio State University), M.A. and Ph.D. (Yale University)
- Alma mater: Yale University
- Occupations: Writer, professor, curator, scholar
- Known for: Scholarship in American art, film, and visual culture
- Notable work: Shooting Kennedy, Grand Illusions, Titanic
- Spouse: Libby Lubin
- Children: Molly Lubin, Gus Lubin
- Awards: Charles Eldredge Prize (2004)

David M. Lubin (born November 24, 1950) is an American writer, professor, curator, and scholar. He has published eight books on American art, film, and popular culture.

In a much-noted survey of scholarship in American art written for the Art Bulletin, Stanford art historian Wanda Corn identified Lubin, then at the start of his career, as "one of the most provocative representatives" of a new mode of "interpretive criticism has transfigured the close-up study of the single work of art." According to the French cultural historian François Brunet, "Lubin shows himself to be an innovative, indeed, iconoclastic historian of art, in organizing the confrontation of genres and visual registers—painting, photography, chromolithographs, advertisements, postcards—to explore the social and cultural values associated with the image from the middle of the 19th century to start of the 20th."

== Education and academic career ==
A native of Columbus, Ohio, Lubin attended four institutions of higher education before receiving his B.A. in English. These include Principia College, the University of Michigan, the University of Southern California, and Ohio State University. While studying filmmaking as an undergraduate at the University of Southern California's School of Cinema, Lubin reviewed music for Rolling Stone.

After independently studying film history in Paris, he received an M.A. and a Ph.D. in American Studies from Yale University in 1983. His first academic job was teaching art history and American studies at Colby College in Waterville, Maine, from 1983 to 1999, before accepting a position as the Charlotte C. Weber Professor of Art at Wake Forest University. In 2016–2017, he served as the inaugural Terra Foundation Visiting Professor of American Art at the University of Oxford. Lubin has received fellowship awards from Harvard University, Stanford University, Yale University, and the National Gallery of Art's Center for Advanced Study in the Visual Arts, as well as the American Council of Learned Societies, the Getty Foundation, and the John Simon Guggenheim Memorial Foundation. In 2004, Lubin was awarded the Smithsonian American Art Museum's Charles Eldredge Prize for "distinguished scholarship in American art."

In 2016, Lubin, along with Robert Cozzolino and Anne Knutson, curated the exhibition "World War I and American Art" for the Pennsylvania Academy of Fine Arts in Philadelphia. The exhibition traveled in 2017 to the New-York Historical Society and the Frist Center for the Visual Arts in Nashville. Lubin, Cozzolino, and Knutson co-edited the exhibition catalogue, which was a finalist for the College Art Association's prestigious Alfred H. Barr Award.

== Writing ==
Aside from his record reviews in Rolling Stone and book reviews and op-ed pieces in various newspapers, including the Christian Science Monitor, Washington Post, and Los Angeles Times, Lubin's published writing mostly consists of scholarly books and essays. His first book, Act of Portrayal: Eakins, Sargent, James, grew out of his 1983 Ph.D. dissertation. His second, Picturing a Nation: Art and Social Change in Nineteenth-Century America, is a revisionist study of American painting in terms of race, gender, and class politics during the turbulent nineteenth century. Titanic (BFI, 1999), a monograph written for the British Film Institute's "Modern Classics" series, explores the artistic and cinematic antecedents of James Cameron's blockbuster movie.

Shooting Kennedy: JFK and the Culture of Images traces the public and private lives of Jacqueline and John F. Kennedy as rendered in photography from their courtship in 1953 to his assassination and funeral in 1963. The Cornell cultural historian Michael Kammen wrote, "(Lubin) provides a fresh methodology for the contextualization of American historical events—and our perception of them—that is likely to be pursued for years to come." In his book review for United Press International, Lou Marano wrote that "'Shooting Kennedy' is a carefully researched and emotionally evocative treatment of a cultural and political watershed."

Flags and Faces: The Visual Culture of First World War America is a slender volume containing expanded versions of the two Franklin D. Murphy Lectures in the History of Art that Lubin delivered at the University of Kansas in 2008. The essay on flags considers prowar and antiwar imagery in American art on the eve of the United States declaration of war on Germany in April 1917. The essay on faces charts the development of modern plastic surgery and cosmetic makeup in response to the brutal disfigurement of combatants in trench warfare.

In Grand Illusions: American Art and the First World War, Lubin provides a multidisciplinary examination of American art, society, and war in the early twentieth century. Professor Jennifer Wingate wrote in Panorama: The Journal of the Association of Historians of American Art, "In summary, readers will appreciate the breadth of subject matter in Grand Illusions, the inclusion of lesser-known cultural voices, and the eye-opening comparisons that connect themes and artwork in unexpected ways." Yaëlle Azagury gave the book a more mixed review in the Washington Post, writing that "...his readings, which may be irritating to the political conservative or the more classic-minded, are intellectually provocative", but "he delivers a disparate collection of essays while failing to conclude whether, indeed, a cohesive national style emerged in the aftermath of the war."

Ready for My Close-up: The Making of ‘Sunset Boulevard’ and the Dark Side of the Hollywood Dream offers a cultural history about the making and lasting significance of Sunset Boulevard, whose piercing and in many ways, prophetic critiques of fame continue to resonate today.

== Art-historical method ==
Lubin calls on us to slow down and be more mindful when looking at art, a process he models with his own "slow looking" at cultural artifacts such as paintings, photographs, and films: "Classroom Patriotism," Panorama: Journal of the Association of Historians of American Art, vol. 3, no. 2 (Fall 2017), "Slow Looking," online essay for the History of Art at Oxford University (July 2017), "Art History as Collage: A Personal Approach," in Blackwell Companion to American Art, ed. John Davis, Jennifer Greenhill.

In 1994, The Chronicle of Higher Education featured Lubin in a cover story by Scott Heller entitled "Art Historian as Provocateur."

== Media appearances ==
Lubin occasionally appears on radio and television to talk about American art:

- Interview about Grand Illusions on C-Span's American History TV (December 11, 2016)
- Featured expert on America Rising: The Arts of the Gilded Age, DVD, dir. Michael Maglaras (217 Films, released January 20, 2017)
- "One Sculptor's Answer to WWI Wounds: Plaster, Copper and Paint" on NPR's All Things Considered (September 25, 2014)

== Bibliography ==
- Act of Portrayal: Eakins, Sargent, James (New Haven: Yale University Press, 1985)
- Picturing a Nation: Art and Social Change in Nineteenth-Century America (New Haven: Yale University Press, 1994)
- Titanic (London: British Film Institute, 1999)
- Shooting Kennedy: JFK and the Culture of Images (Berkeley and Los Angeles: University of California Press, 2003)
- Flags and Faces: The Visual Culture of America's First World War (Oakland: University of California Press, 2015)
- Grand Illusions: American Art and the First World War (New York: Oxford University Press, 2016)
- World War I and American Art, exhibition catalogue, co-edited with Robert Cozzolino and Anne Knutson (Princeton, NJ: Princeton University Press in association with the Pennsylvania Academy of Fine Art, Philadelphia, 2016)
- Ready for My Close-up: The Making of Sunset Boulevard and the Dark Side of Hollywood (Grand Central Publishing, 2025)

== Personal life ==
Lubin is married to the travel organizer and writer Libby Lubin. Their children are Molly Lubin, a psychiatrist, and Gus Lubin, a journalist.
