= Why I Write =

Writer's motivational manifesto by George Orwell

"Why I Write" is a 1946 essay by George Orwell detailing his personal journey to becoming a writer. It was first published in the Summer 1946 edition of Gangrel. The editors of this magazine, J. B. Pick and Charles Neill, had asked a selection of writers to explain why they write.

The essay offers a type of mini-autobiography in which he writes of having first completed poems and tried his hand at short-stories, and carried on a continuous "story" about himself in his head, before finally becoming a full-fledged writer. It goes on to set out some important motives for writing.

== Four motives for writing ==
Orwell lists "four great motives for writing" which he feels exist in every writer. He explains that all are present, but in different proportions, and also that these proportions vary from time to time. They are as follows:

1. Sheer egoism- Orwell argues that a writer writes from a "desire to seem clever, to be talked about, to be remembered after death, to get your own back on grown-ups who snubbed you in childhood, etc." He says that this is a motive the writer shares with scientists, artists, lawyers - "the whole top crust of humanity" - and that the great mass of humanity, not acutely selfish, after the age of about thirty abandons individual ambition. A minority remains however, determined 'to live their own lives to the end, and writers belong in this class.' Serious writers are vainer than journalists, though "less interested in money".
2. Aesthetic enthusiasm- Orwell explains that the present in writing is the desire to make one's writing look and sound good, having "pleasure in the impact of one sound on another, in the firmness of good prose or the rhythm of a good story." He says that this motive is "very feeble in a lot of writers" but still present in all works of writing.
3. Historical impulse- He sums this up stating this motive is the "desire to see things as they are, to find out true facts and store them up for the use of posterity."
4. Political purpose- Orwell writes that "no book is genuinely free from political bias", and further explains that this motive is used very commonly in all forms of writing in the broadest sense, citing a "desire to push the world in a certain direction" in every person. He concludes by saying that "the opinion that art should have nothing to do with politics is itself a political attitude."

In the essay, Orwell charts his own development towards a political writer. He cites the Spanish Civil War as the defining event that shaped the political slant of his writing:

The Spanish war and other events in 1936-37 turned the scale and thereafter I knew where I stood. Every line of serious work that I have written since 1936 has been written, directly or indirectly, against totalitarianism and for democratic socialism, as I understand it.

Orwell, who is considered to be a very political writer, says that by nature, he is "a person in whom the first three motives would outweigh the fourth", and that he "might have remained almost unaware of [his] political loyalties", - but that he had been "forced into becoming a sort of pamphleteer" because his era was not a peaceful one. In the decade since 1936-37 his desire had been to "make political writing into an art". He concludes the essay explaining that "it is invariably where I lacked a political purpose that I wrote lifeless books and was betrayed into purple passages, sentences without meaning, decorative adjectives and humbug generally."
