= Julia Namier =

Russian writer (1893–1977)

- Юлия Нэмир
- Born: Yulia Mikhailovna Kazarina; 1893; Saint Petersburg, Russian Empire
- Died: 1977 (aged 83–84)
- Writing career
- Genre: Biography
- Notable awards: James Tait Black Memorial Prize (1971)

Julia, Lady Namier (born Yulia Mikhailovna Kazarina, (Note: In this name that follows East Slavic naming customs, the patronymic is Mikhailovna and the family name is Kazarina.) (Note: Russian: Юлия Михайловна Казарина) later surnamed de Beausobre; (Note: Russian: де Бособр, romanised: de Bosobr) 1893-1977) was a Russian writer. She wrote several works on Christian spirituality, and a biography of her husband, British historian Lewis Namier.

== Biography ==
Yulia Mikhailovna Kazarina was born in 1893 and brought up in Saint Petersburg, Russia. Her first husband, Nicolai de Beausobre, a Russian diplomat reportedly persecuted by the Soviet authorities, died in the 1930s. Yulia herself was exiled to a concentration camp. She was ransomed by her former governess, a British woman, and migrated to the United Kingdom. She left Russia in 1934.

In Britain, she published an autobiography, The Woman Who Could Not Die (1938) and reflections on Creative Suffering (1940). She went on to publish a translation of Russian Letters of Direction by Macarius the Elder of Optino (1944), and a life of Seraphim of Sarov, Flame in the Snow (1945), based on popular sources rather than the official hagiography.

In 1947, she married historian Lewis Namier, who was knighted five years later, in 1952. After his death in 1960, she wrote his biography, for which she received the James Tait Black Award in 1971. She died in 1977.

== Selected works ==
- The Woman Who Could Not Die (1938)
- Creative Suffering (1940)
- Russian Letters of Direction by Macarius the Elder of Optino (1944)
- Flame in the Snow A Russian Legend (1945)
- Lewis Namier: A Biography (1971)
