= Sexcrime (Nineteen Eighty-Four) (song) =

- Original US single

Single by Eurythmics

from the album 1984 (For the Love of Big Brother)
- B-side: "I Did It Just the Same" (LP version)
- Released: 22 October 1984
- Length: 3:56; 8:01 (extended Version)
- Label: RCA Records (US); Virgin (UK)
- Songwriters: Annie Lennox; David A. Stewart
- Producer: David A. Stewart

Eurythmics singles chronology
"Here Comes the Rain Again" (1984)	"Sexcrime (Nineteen Eighty-Four)" (1984)	"Julia" (1985)

Music video
- "Sexcrime (Nineteen Eighty-Four)" on YouTube

"Sexcrime (Nineteen Eighty-Four)" is a song written and performed by the British duo Eurythmics. It was released as the first single from their album 1984 (For the Love of Big Brother), which served as the soundtrack to the film Nineteen Eighty-Four, an adaptation of the novel of the same name by George Orwell. The song was produced by Dave Stewart.

== Background and reception ==
"Sexcrime" is a song which features heavy sampling of Lennox's voice, utilizing snippets of her vocal performance to produce a stuttering effect. Also prominently featured is the voice of Stewart, with the aid of a vocoder, uttering the phrase "nineteen eighty four". It was the first of two singles released from the soundtrack album. The term "sexcrime" is one of several Newspeak words found within the novel. The song was originally intended to appear in the film 1984, but was dropped prior to the film's release. However, it was used as background music for the film's trailer, and the song's promotional video was included on home video releases of the film. In addition to the standard 7" and 12" formats, the song was also released as a limited edition 12" picture disc.

Cash Box called it a "fascinating song" that is "somewhat constrained" by the Eurythmics' practice of writing songs using few notes. Billboard called it a "compelling dance track...with its aura of doomy foreboding [and] touches of humor."

== Chart performance ==
The single peaked at number 4 on the UK Singles Chart, becoming Eurythmics' sixth consecutive top 10 hit. It was one of the duo's biggest selling singles in the UK, being certified silver by the BPI for sales in excess of 250,000 copies. It was also a big hit throughout Europe, a top 10 hit in New Zealand, a top 20 hit in Canada, and one of the duo's biggest selling singles in Australia.

"Sexcrime" met with strong resistance on United States radio and on video outlets such as MTV – the song's title was particularly controversial to those who were not aware of the meaning of the word in Orwell's novel. The music video (featuring a straightforward performance of the song by Lennox and Stewart) had limited rotation on MTV. "Sexcrime" peaked at number 81 on the Billboard Hot 100, but was much more successful on the US Hot Dance Club Play chart, where it reached number 2.

== Track listings ==
7"

- A: "Sexcrime (1984)" (LP Version) – 3:57
- B: "I Did It Just the Same" (LP Version) – 3:32

12"

- A: "Sexcrime (1984)" (Extended Mix) – 8:01
- B1: "Sexcrime (1984)" (LP Version) – 3:57
- B2: "I Did It Just the Same" (LP Version) – 3:32

3" CD reissue

- A: "Sexcrime (1984)" (Extended Mix) – 8:01
- B1: "Julia" (LP Version) – 6:38
- B2: "I Did It Just the Same" (LP Version) – 3:32

== Charts ==
=== Weekly charts ===
Weekly chart performance for "Sexcrime (Nineteen Eighty-Four)"
Chart (1984–1985)	Peak position
Australia (Kent Music Report)	5
Belgium (Ultratop 50 Flanders)	3
Canada Top Singles (RPM)	18
Europe (European Top 100 Singles)	7
France (SNEP)	7
Ireland (IRMA)	4
Italy (Musica e dischi)	19
Netherlands (Dutch Top 40)	10
Netherlands (Single Top 100)	12
New Zealand (Recorded Music NZ)	8
Norway (VG-lista)	9
Sweden (Sverigetopplistan)	3
Switzerland (Schweizer Hitparade)	6
UK Singles (Official Charts)	4
US Billboard Hot 100	81
US Dance Club Songs (Billboard) with "I Did It Just the Same"	2
West Germany (GfK)	3

=== Year-end charts ===
1984 year-end chart performance for "Sexcrime (Nineteen Eighty-Four)"
Chart (1984)	Position
Belgium (Ultratop 50 Flanders)	84
Netherlands (Single Top 100)	95
UK Singles (Gallup)	58

1985 year-end chart performance for "Sexcrime (Nineteen Eighty-Four)"
Chart (1985)	Position
Australia (Kent Music Report)	51
France (IFOP)	45
US Dance Club Songs (Billboard) with "I Did It Just the Same"	15
West Germany (Official German Charts)	38

== Certifications ==
Certifications for "Sexcrime (Nineteen Eighty-Four)"
Region	Certification	Certified units/sales
United Kingdom (BPI)	Silver	250,000^{^}
^{^} Shipments figures based on certification alone.
