= This Is the House =

Single by Eurythmics

from the album Sweet Dreams (Are Made of This)
- Released: 2 April 1982
- Recorded: 1981, 1982
- Genre: New wave; synthpop
- Length: 5:02
- Label: RCA Records
- Songwriters: Annie Lennox; David A. Stewart
- Producers: David A. Stewart; Adam Williams

Eurythmics singles chronology
"Belinda" (1981)	"This Is the House" (1982)	"The Walk" (1982)

Audio video
- "This Is the House" on YouTube

"This Is the House" is a song by the British new wave duo Eurythmics, released on 2 April 1982 by RCA as the lead single from the band's second studio album, Sweet Dreams (Are Made of This) (1983).

== Background ==
Recorded in early 1982 on their own 8-track home studio in north London (financed with a personal bank loan rather than record company support), the single was commercially unsuccessful and failed to chart. No music video was made for the single. Speaking to the NME in 1982, Lennox believed the single heralded a major breakthrough for the duo on an artistic level: "It really is a landmark for us – in our development as writers, in mine as a singer. We've put our flag down there with 'The Walk', and the next steps forward will follow on from there."

In Australia, "This Is the House" was released in 1983, following the chart success of "Sweet Dreams (Are Made of This)" and "Love Is a Stranger". The single was listed on the Kent Music Report chart as receiving 'significant sales reports' outside the top 100, for two consecutive weeks in September 1983. The highest ranking "This Is the House" achieved on this list was fifth place. On its second appearance on this list, the single charted alongside "Who's That Girl?"

The B-side of the 7" single is entitled "Home Is Where the Heart Is", which was exclusive to this single until 2005 when it was released on the remastered CD of the Sweet Dreams (Are Made Of This) album.

The 12-inch single featured an extended remix of "This Is the House", plus four live tracks. This extended mix, plus the live version of "Your Time Will Come", were omitted from SonyBMG's 2005 remastered releases of Eurythmics' back catalogue, and remain unavailable on CD. However, the live versions of "Never Gonna Cry Again", "4/4 in Leather" and "Take Me to Your Heart" were included on SonyBMG's 2005 remastered release of the In The Garden album.

== Critical reception ==
Upon its release as a single, Kim Wilde, as guest reviewer for Flexipop, remarked, "Dave Stewart is doing the synthesisers on this. I'm a great fan of his, and this song is really great. I love all the brass in it. Excellent." Paul Du Noyer, writing for NME, described it as a "piece of clean, conventional major label music" and an "unexceptional number glam[med]-up with electronic treatments and trendy Japanese touches". In a negative review, Ian Birch of Smash Hits criticised the band for its reliance on "clever effects" over songcraft. He also said that the song's lyrics, which "crochet obscure words from Bowie and Grace Jones", were unlikely to elicit any interest from the public. Johnny Waller of Sounds was also critical, writing, "Still trying to be too clever and commercial, pretending to be a pop group, without realising you must make pop music and hit singles to qualify." Sunie of Record Mirror noted that, despite their attempt to "use every contemporary trimming from electronics to brass", "This Is the House" is as "conceited, sterile and empty" as the duo's work in their previous band, the Tourists.

== Track listing ==
7"

- A: "This Is the House" – 4:02
- B: "Home Is Where the Heart Is" (non-LP track) – 3:03

12"

- "This Is the House" (extended remix) – 6:11
- "Your Time Will Come" (live) – 7:18
- "Never Gonna Cry Again" (live) – 4:36
- "4/4 in Leather" (live) – 3:05
- "Take Me to Your Heart" (live) – 5:00

== Personnel ==
=== "This Is the House" ===
- Annie Lennox: vocals
- Dave Stewart: synthesisers & sequencers, backing vocals
- Andy Brown: bass guitar
- Reynard Falconer: bass section synthesisers
- Dick Cuthell: horns
- John Turnbull: guitar
- Adam Williams: backing vocals
- Maria Elvira Behro-García: South American girl
- Mercedes: special guest
- Chantal Arnaud, Nadine Masseron, Emily McLeod, Pauline Stride: street chorus

=== "Home Is Where the Heart Is" ===
- Annie Lennox: vocals
- Dave Stewart: synthesisers and sequencers
- Adam Williams: bass guitar

=== Live tracks ===
- Annie Lennox: vocals, flute
- David A Stewart: double-neck electric guitar/bass guitar
- Tim Wheater: synthesizer, oriental flute
- Adam Williams: record (live & direct) and mix (On Stage)
- the other instruments were playing off backing tape.
