= The Tourists (album) =

Studio album by the Tourists
- Released: June 1979
- Recorded: April 1979
- Studio: Conny's Studio
- Genre: Post-punk; power pop
- Label: Logo
- Producer: Conny Plank, the Tourists

The Tourists chronology
| The Tourists (1979) | Reality Effect (1979) |

Alternative Cover
- German cover of "The Tourists".

Professional ratings
Review scores
| Source | Rating |
|---|---|
| AllMusic | 4.5/5 stars |
| Music Week | 2/4 stars |

The Tourists is the debut album from the British band the Tourists, released in 1979. The album peaked at No. 72 in the UK Albums Chart.

Two singles were released from the album. "Blind Among the Flowers" peaked at No. 52 in the UK Singles Chart, and "The Loneliest Man in the World" peaked at No. 32.

The album has never been issued on compact disc but some tracks can be found on the various compilation compact discs.

== Track listing ==
- Original credits: All tracks written by Peet Coombes.
- BMI database: All tracks written by Coombes, except "The Loneliest Man in the World": Coombes/Lennox/Stewart
1. "Blind Among the Flowers" - 3:30
2. "Save Me" - 1:54
3. "Fools Paradise" - 3:26
4. "Can't Stop Laughing" - 3:49
5. "Don't Get Left Behind" - 1:42
6. "Another English Day" - 1:15
7. "Deadly Kiss" - 3:55
8. "Ain't No Room" - 3:28
9. "The Loneliest Man in the World" - 4:06
10. "Useless Duration of Time" - 4:23
11. "He Who Laughs Last Laughs Longest" - 1:44
12. "Just Like You" - 4:48

== Personnel ==
The Tourists

- Annie Lennox – vocals, keyboards
- Peet Coombes – guitars, vocals
- David Stewart – guitars, vocals
- Eddie Chin – bass
- Jim "Do It" Tooney – drums

Production

- Conny Plank – production
- The Tourists – production
- Dave Hutchins – engineering ("Ain't No Room")

Other

- Neil Kirk – photography
- Bill Smith – design and art

== Charts ==
| Chart (1979) | Peak position |
|---|---|
| UK Albums Chart | 72 |
