= Reality Effect =

Studio album by the Tourists
- Released: October 1979
- Recorded: August 1979
- Studios: Olympic Studios and DJM Studios, London
- Genres: Post-punk; power pop
- Labels: Logo Records; Epic Records (US/Canada)
- Producer: Tom Allom

The Tourists chronology
The Tourists (1979)	Reality Effect (1979)	Luminous Basement (1980)

Reality Effect is the second album by the British band the Tourists, released in 1979.

This album received much more favourable reviews than the band's first album, with catchier songs and a stronger reliance on the vocals of singer Annie Lennox. The album contained two hit singles, "So Good to Be Back Home Again" (UK #8) and a cover of the 1964 Dusty Springfield song "I Only Want to Be With You" (UK #4).

Although the band featured Lennox and her future Eurythmics partner Dave Stewart on guitar, the bulk of the songs were written by singer/guitarist Peet Coombes. The album peaked at #23 on the UK Album Chart, and spent a total of sixteen weeks in the Top 100.

== Reception ==
Professional ratings
Review scores
Source	Rating
AllMusic	3/5 stars
Music Week	3/4 stars
Smash Hits	6/10

Smash Hits said, "Plenty of lasting writing talent but as much character as an iceberg. ELO would have been proud of some of this, but it's SO depressingly sombre. Let down by po-faced lyrics about 'life'."

== UK Track listing ==
All tracks composed by Peet Coombes except where indicated

Side 1

1. "It Doesn't Have to Be This Way" – 3:45
2. "I Only Want to Be with You" – 2:24 (Mike Hawker, Ivor Raymonde)
3. "In the Morning (When the Madness has Faded)" – 4:09
4. "All Life's Tragedies" – 3:48
5. "Everywhere You Look" – 3:18
6. "So Good to Be Back Home Again" – 2:39

Side 2

1. "Nothing to Do" – 3:27
2. "Circular Fever" – 3:06 (Peet Coombes, Dave Stewart)
3. "In My Mind (There's Sorrow)" – 4:44
4. "Something in the Air Tonight" – 3:42
5. "Summer's Night" – 3:17

== US Track listing ==
All tracks composed by Peet Coombes except where indicated

Side 1

1. "It Doesn't Have to Be This Way" – 3:45
2. "I Only Want to Be with You" – 2:24 (Mike Hawker, Ivor Raymonde)
3. ”Blind Among the Flowers” – 3:25
4. "In the Morning (When the Madness has Faded)" – 4:09
5. "All Life's Tragedies" – 3:48
6. "Everywhere You Look" – 3:18

Side 2

1. "Nothing to Do" – 3:27
2. ”The Loneliest Man in the World” – 3:04
3. "So Good to Be Back Home Again" – 2:39
4. "Circular Fever" – 3:06 (Peet Coombes, Dave Stewart)
5. "In My Mind (There's Sorrow)" – 4:44
6. ”Fool’s Paradise” – 4:07

== Personnel ==
The Tourists

- Annie Lennox – vocals, organ, piano, harpsichord, string synthesizer
- Peet Coombes – vocals, electric 6-string & 12-string guitars
- David A. Stewart – electric guitars, acoustic guitars, backing vocals
- Eddie Chin – bass guitar
- Jim "Do It" Toomey – drums, percussion

with:

- Graham Preskett – trumpet and string arrangements

Technical

- Andy Lunn, Bill Gill, Dick Plant, Barry Kidd – engineer
- Tom Allom – producer

== Charts ==
Chart (1979/80)	Peak position
Australia (Kent Music Report)	62
Canada Top Albums/CDs (RPM)	87
United Kingdom (Official Charts Company)	23
