= Sweet Dreams (Are Made of This) (album) =

1983 studio album by Eurythmics

Studio album by Eurythmics
- Released: January 1983
- Recorded: 1982
- Studios: Eurythmics' 8-track studio; The Church Studios, London
- Genres: Dance-pop; synth-pop; new wave
- Length: 42:21
- Label: RCA
- Producers: David A. Stewart; Adam Williams; Robert Crash

Eurythmics chronology
In the Garden (1981)	Sweet Dreams (Are Made of This) (1983)	Touch (1983)

Singles from Sweet Dreams (Are Made of This)
- 1. "This Is the House" Released: 2 April 1982; 2. "The Walk" Released: 18 June 1982; 3. "Love Is a Stranger" Released: 8 October 1982; 4. "Sweet Dreams (Are Made of This)" Released: 24 January 1983

Sweet Dreams (Are Made of This) is the second studio album by British pop duo Eurythmics, released on 4 January 1983 by RCA Records. Along with the title track, which reached number two on the UK Singles Chart and number one on the US Billboard Hot 100 that year, the album also features the singles "This Is the House", "The Walk", and "Love Is a Stranger".

== Background and release ==
=== Recording and production ===
The album was assembled by Eurythmics mainly at two locations: a small project studio in the attic of an old warehouse in the Chalk Farm district of north London, where the duo spent seven months living and working, followed by a small room in the Church Studios in London.

The album was largely recorded onto an 8-track tape machine, apart from three songs: "The Walk" was transferred onto a friend's 16-track, and "Somebody Told Me" and "Wrap It Up" were both recorded onto 24-track (using only half the tracks) while the Church studio was being built. Lennox believed that the band's efficiency was better with the 8-track compared to the 16-track machine.

Equipment-wise, the band had a recording setup consisting of a Tascam 80-8 8-track, a Soundcraft Series 2 mixer, two Beyerdynamic M201 TG microphones, a Roland Space Echo, a Furman compressor, a B.E.L. Electronics noise reduction unit, and a Klark Teknik DN50 spring reverb unit. The instruments they used were mainly a Roland SH-09 synthesizer (later said to be an SH-101 instead), a CSQ-100 sequencer, a Gretsch slide guitar, a Movement drum computer, a Roland Juno-6, and a borrowed Oberheim synthesizer (later described as the OB-X model by Stewart). Overall, the record cost around £5,000 to make because of equipment costs.

Lennox sang all the lead vocals on Sweet Dreams (Are Made of This), with the exception of "Wrap It Up", which was performed as a duet with Green Gartside of Scritti Politti. The band decided to record the song after hearing it on a Sam & Dave compilation album.

=== Release ===
After a year and a half of initial commercial failure for Eurythmics, the album became a breakthrough for the duo on both sides of the Atlantic. The title track became particularly popular and remains one of Eurythmics' most recognisable songs. Its music video, popular on MTV in the United States, featured Annie Lennox's gender-bending imagery. In the wake of this success, the single "Love Is a Stranger", previously a flop, was re-released and became a hit as well. It was accompanied by a video that featured Lennox dressed both as a man and a woman.

The album was re-released in 2005 with the entire Eurythmics studio catalogue, except the 1984 (For the Love of Big Brother) album, to which Virgin Records holds the rights. The recordings were remastered, and several bonus tracks were added to each of the eight albums. In this release, Sweet Dreams (Are Made of This) acquired six bonus tracks. Early Australian, German, and US CD releases (printed in Japan) and the 2005 reissue version of this album have a slightly longer version of "This City Never Sleeps". The length of 6:40 is due to some mixed sound effects and a backmasked message by David A. Stewart saying, "I enjoyed making that there record. Very good, very good."

Stewart was particularly pleased with the final product and called it "one of the most important records of 1983", due to the "carefully structured" arrangements and lyrics.

== Critical reception ==
Professional ratings
Review scores
Source	Rating
AllMusic	4.5/5 stars
Christgau's Record Guide	B
PopMatters	9/10
Record Collector	4/5 stars
Rolling Stone	3/5 stars
The Rolling Stone Album Guide	4/5 stars
Slant Magazine	4/5 stars
Smash Hits	6/10
Spin Alternative Record Guide	8/10
Uncut	4/5 stars

Sweet Dreams (Are Made of This) has generally received mixed-to-positive reviews from music critics. Smash Hits noted that some of the lyrics detracted from the "otherwise pleasant LP", although they were complimentary of "Love Is a Stranger". Robert Christgau found that the album was "starkly hooky" but called the duo pretentious. Cashbox wrote that it was "difficult to find anything to disagree with on this haunting, forceful showing." AllMusic praised some of the singles but felt that the album possessed a few dull moments. The album was included in the book 1001 Albums You Must Hear Before You Die.

== Track listing ==
All tracks are written by Annie Lennox and David A. Stewart, except "Wrap It Up", which is by Isaac Hayes and David Porter, and "Satellite of Love", by Lou Reed.

No.	Title	Length
1.	"Love Is a Stranger"	3:43
2.	"I've Got an Angel"	2:44
3.	"Wrap It Up"	3:33
4.	"I Could Give You (A Mirror)"	3:51
5.	"The Walk"	4:40
6.	"Sweet Dreams (Are Made of This)"	3:36
7.	"Jennifer"	5:05
8.	"This Is the House"	5:00
9.	"Somebody Told Me"	3:29
10.	"This City Never Sleeps"	6:40
Total length:		42:21

2005 special edition bonus tracks
No.	Title	Length
11.	"Home Is Where the Heart Is"	3:01
12.	"Monkey Monkey"	5:19
13.	"Baby's Gone Blue"	4:17
14.	"Sweet Dreams (Are Made of This)" (Hot Remix)	5:19
15.	"Love Is a Stranger" (Coldcut Remix)	7:17
16.	"Satellite of Love"	4:36
Total length:		72:10

== Personnel ==
Credits adapted from the liner notes of Sweet Dreams (Are Made of This).

- Annie Lennox – vocals
- David A. Stewart – production (all tracks); engineering
- Adam Williams – production (tracks 1, 2, 5, 8); engineering
- Robert Crash – production (tracks 3, 4, 9); engineering
- Chris Ashbrook – video stills
- Lewis Ziolek – cover photography
- Laurence Stevens – design
- Green Gartside – guest vocals (track 3)

== Sweet Dreams: The Video Album ==
Sweet Dreams: The Video Album

Video by Eurythmics
- Released: 1983
- Recorded: 1982–1983
- Length: 63 minutes
- Label: BMG Video
- Director: Derek Burbidge
- Producers: Kate Burbidge; Maurice Bacon

Eurythmics chronology
Sweet Dreams: The Video Album (1983)	Eurythmics Live (1987)

Eurythmics also released a video album for Sweet Dreams (Are Made of This), featuring in-concert performances, promotional videos, and narrative animation highlighting the duo's singles "Sweet Dreams (Are Made of This)", "Love Is a Stranger", and other songs from the album.

The live concert performances, taped at the Heaven nightclub in London, feature a selection of songs from Sweet Dreams (Are Made of This), as well as two songs from their 1981 debut album, In the Garden, "Never Gonna Cry Again" and "Take Me to Your Heart".

The video album was directed by Derek Burbidge, with the exception of the promos for "Love Is a Stranger" (directed by Mike Brady), "Who's That Girl?" (directed by Duncan Gibbins), and "Sweet Dreams (Are Made of This)" (directed by Chris Ashbrook).

=== Information ===
- Director: Derek Burbidge
- Producers: Kate Burbidge, Maurice Bacon
- Executive producer: Mickey Shapiro
- Animation: Bura and Hardwick
- VHS release: 1983
- DVD release: 1998

=== Track listing ===
1. "Prologue" (introduction montage) – 1:46
2. "This Is the House" (live version) – 4:48
3. "Never Gonna Cry Again" (live version) – 4:21
4. "Take Me to Your Heart" (live version) – 4:08
5. "I've Got an Angel" (live version) – 3:41
6. "Satellite of Love" (live version) – 5:01
7. "Love Is a Stranger" (promo) – 3:26
8. "Who's That Girl?" (promo) – 3:40
9. "This City Never Sleeps" (live version) – 5:12
10. "Jennifer" (live version) – 4:39
11. "Sweet Dreams (Are Made of This)" (live version) – 3:36
12. "I Could Give You (A Mirror)" (live version) – 3:47
13. "Somebody Told Me" (live version) – 3:25
14. "Wrap It Up" (live version) – 3:20
15. "Tous les garçons et les filles" (live version) – 3:40
16. "Sweet Dreams (Are Made of This)" (promo) – 3:40

== Charts ==
=== Weekly charts ===
Weekly chart performance for Sweet Dreams (Are Made of This)
Chart (1983–2022)	Peak position
Australian Albums (Kent Music Report)	5
Canada Top Albums/CDs (RPM)	6
Dutch Albums (Album Top 100)	11
German Albums (Offizielle Top 100)	6
Greek Albums (IFPI Greece)	66
Japanese Albums (Oricon)	77
New Zealand Albums (RMNZ)	2
Swedish Albums (Sverigetopplistan)	14
UK Albums (Official Charts)	3
US Billboard 200	15
US Rock Albums (Billboard)	18
US Top R&B/Hip-Hop Albums (Billboard)	36

=== Year-end charts ===
1983 year-end chart performance for Sweet Dreams (Are Made of This)
Chart (1983)	Position
Australian Albums (Kent Music Report)	19
Canada Top Albums/CDs (RPM)	17
Dutch Albums (Album Top 100)	33
German Albums (Offizielle Top 100)	34
New Zealand Albums (RMNZ)	4
UK Albums (Gallup)	15
US Billboard 200	72

1984 year-end chart performance for Sweet Dreams (Are Made of This)
Chart (1984)	Position
US Billboard 200	72

== Certifications ==
Certifications for Sweet Dreams (Are Made of This)
Region	Certification	Certified units/sales
Canada (Music Canada)	2× Platinum	200,000^{^}
Germany (BVMI)	Gold	250,000^{^}
New Zealand (RMNZ)	Gold	7,500^{‡}
United Kingdom (BPI)	Platinum	300,000^{^}
United States (RIAA)	Gold	500,000^{^}
^{^} Shipments figures based on certification alone.^{‡} Sales+streaming figures based on certification alone.
