= Luminous Basement =

Studio album by the Tourists
- Released: October 1980
- Recorded: May – August 1980
- Genre: Post-punk; new wave
- Label: RCA; Epic
- Producer: Tom Allom; David A. Stewart

The Tourists chronology
Reality Effect (1979)	Luminous Basement (1980)

Luminous Basement is the third and final studio album from the band the Tourists, released in 1980. The album peaked at #75 in the UK, lasting within the Top 100 for one week. One single released from the album, "Don't Say I Told You So", peaked at #40 in the UK singles chart.

== Background ==
Following the band's previous album Reality Effect, the Tourists were faced with a contractual dispute with their record label Logo. This led to Luminous Basement being recorded for RCA instead. The album was produced by Tom Allom and David A. Stewart at George Martin's studio in Montserrat. Stewart would later recall in his 2016 autobiography that the making of the album was "not a good experience" and "trouble brewing in paradise". This was largely due to the band being worn-out, disagreements between Coombes and Lennox, and Coombes' own drug habit.

Despite the single "Don't Say I Told You So" reaching the UK Top 40, the album itself sold poorly, and was seen as a disappointment compared to the band's previous album Reality Effect which had reached the Top 25. The lack of commercial success was combined with largely received negative reviews in the music press.

To promote the album's release, the band embarked on a 32-date UK and Ireland tour during September and October 1980, although four of these dates were cancelled. Afterwards the band went to Thailand and then Australia for further promotion of the album. On the night of arriving in Sydney, Coombes overdosed and fell ill. The band had to continue promoting the album through TV and radio, while Coombes flew back to the UK to recover. The band felt that without Coombes, their primary songwriter and vocalist, The Tourists couldn't continue, and so once the band completed their Australasian promotional run they disbanded.

== Release ==
The album was released via RCA in the UK, Europe, Japan and Australia, while Epic Records released it in America and Canada. It was released on vinyl LP and cassette.

The UK edition of the album came with a free bonus 7" single of a new track titled "From the Middle Room", backed by the exclusive b-side "Into The Future". The A-Side was written by both David A. Stewart and Annie Lennox. Some versions of the 7" single were produced in yellow, while others were in standard black.

In 1997 the album was issued on CD in Japan, giving it its first and only release on the format. It was released via RCA Records and BMG Japan, Inc., and remains scarce today.

== Critical reception ==
Professional ratings
Review scores
Source	Rating
AllMusic	3/5 stars

In a retrospective review for AllMusic, William Ruhlmann wrote, "The Tourists' third album found the group continuing to expand its musical horizons, especially by integrating Annie Lennox's keyboards into the mix, while maintaining their basic pop/rock focus. Peet Coombes's lyrics had an inward-looking, psychoanalytical focus, and Lennox, on her one contribution, "One Step Near the Edge," maintained that introspection, while Dave Stewart brought in a Yardbirds-like raveup in "Let's Take a Walk." "Don't Say I Told You" showed that the group could still come up with an ear-catching single, but it and the album enjoyed only modest success."

One of the more favourable music reviews during 1980 came from Sounds magazine, which noted the album showed "greater breadth and sharpness from the two previous offerings, but it's still true that so many of The Tourists' best ideas were other people's 10 years ago."

== Track listing ==
All tracks written by Peet Coombes except where noted.

1. "Walls and Foundations" - 4:17
2. "Don't Say I Told You So" - 4:00
3. "Week Days" - 2:45
4. "So You Want To Go Away Now" - 3:08
5. "One Step Nearer The Edge" - 4:43 (Annie Lennox)
6. "Angels and Demons" - 3:16
7. "Talk to Me" - 5:57
8. "Round Round Blues" - 4:05
9. "Let's Take a Walk" - 2:57 (David A. Stewart)
10. "Time Drags So Slow" - 4:44
11. "I'm Going To Change My Mind" - 4:13

Additional tracks on bonus 7"

12. "From The Middle Room" – 4:22 (Lennox, Stewart)
13. "Into The Future" – 1:54

== Personnel ==
The Tourists

- Annie Lennox – lead vocals (4, 5, 6, 10), duet vocals (2, 7, 9, 11), backing vocals, keyboards, synthesizers
- Peet Coombes – lead vocals (1, 3, 8, 13), duet vocals (2, 7, 9, 11), backing vocals, electric 6-string & 12-string guitars
- David A. Stewart – electric guitars, acoustic guitars, synthesizers, backing vocals
- Eddie Chin – bass guitar
- Jim "Do It" Toomey – drums, percussion

Technical personnel:

- Photographs Printed By, Artwork By – Robin Bell
- Photography Artwork By – Willy Smax
- Sleeve & Logo Design Artwork By – John Berg
- Engineer – "Baron" John Punter
- Producer – Tom Allom
- Engineer – Jon Walls
- Assistant Engineer, Technician – Tony George
- Equipment Technician – Davy Wright

== Charts ==
Chart (1980–81)	Peak position
UK Albums Chart	75
US Billboard Bubbling Under the Top LPs	4
US Record World Albums 151-200	176
