= So Good to Be Back Home Again =

1980 single by The Tourists

Single by The Tourists

from the album Reality Effect
- B-side: "Circular Fever"
- Released: 1 February 1980
- Recorded: 1979
- Genre: Power pop
- Length: 2:30
- Label: Logo
- Songwriter: Peet Coombes
- Producer: Tom Allom

The Tourists singles chronology
"I Only Want to Be with You" (1980)	"So Good to Be Back Home Again" (1980)	"Don't Say I Told You So" (1980)

Official video
- "So Good to Be Back Home Again" on YouTube

"So Good to Be Back Home Again" is a song by British band the Tourists, released on 1 February 1980 as a single from the band's second album Reality Effect. It peaked at number 8 on the UK Singles Chart.

== Background and reception ==
After the surprising success of "I Only Want to Be with You", the band capitalised on this by releasing the similarly themed "So Good to Be Back Home Again". At the time, reviewing the song for Record Mirror, Simon Ludgate wrote that "they have enjoyed a great deal of publicity on the success of one single. It's vital therefore to produce a very strong second single and this will probably do the job", with it being "quite catchy". Logo Records' co-founder Geoff Hannington said "it would certainly have been my choice as the first single had we not had that cover". "It was an obvious commercial song to go with".

The energetic song "is one of the Tourists' few love songs, especially unlikely with its cheerful tone", with Annie Lennox and Peet Coombes harmonising together. It is also "clearly drawn from early Beatles".

== Cover version ==
It was covered by rock band the Wildhearts in 1997 as "So Good to Be Back Home". It was released as a B-side to their single "Anthem" and was included on the 2010 reissue of their album Endless, Nameless.

== Charts ==
Chart (1980)	Peak position
Ireland (IRMA)	9
UK Singles (OCC)	8
