= Right by Your Side (Eurythmics song) =

Single by Eurythmics

from the album Touch
- B-side: "Right by Your Side (Party Mix)"
- Released: 4 November 1983
- Recorded: March 1983
- Studio: The Church Studios (London, England)
- Genre: New wave; calypso; electro
- Length: 3:52
- Label: RCA
- Songwriters: Annie Lennox; David A. Stewart
- Producer: David A. Stewart

Eurythmics singles chronology
"Who's That Girl?" (1983)	"Right by Your Side" (1983)	"Here Comes the Rain Again" (1984)

Music video
- "Right by Your Side" on YouTube

"Right by Your Side" is a 1983 song by the British pop duo Eurythmics. It was written by group members Annie Lennox and David A. Stewart, and produced by Stewart.

In the UK, the track was released in November 1983 as the second single from Eurythmics' third album Touch, and was issued a few weeks in advance of the album. In North America, the song was issued as the album's third single, and did was not released until July 1984.

== Background ==
"Right by Your Side" was something of a departure from previous Eurythmics songs, and is an uptempo love song which features a calypso music instrumental backdrop, complete with synthesized steel drum and marimba sounds and a horn section. The steel drum sounds were triggered from a Voyetra synthesiser that Stewart acquired in New York. After spending a few hours getting the Voyetra to function, Stewart landed on a sound that resembled a set of steel drums, which was the first noise that he achieved with the synthesiser. He then worked with Lennox to develop "Right by Your Side" around the steel drum sound. According to Stewart, it took roughly ten minutes for them to write the song.

Stewart sought to record a solo that emulated the playing of King Sunny Adé, so to accomplish this, he recorded his part at half-speed and later sped the recording up. The song's horn dubs were recorded in London by some session musicians.

"Right by Your Side" became the fourth consecutive Eurythmics single to hit the Top 10 of the UK singles chart during 1983. It also climbed to number 29 on the US Billboard Hot 100.

Billboard highlighted its "extravagantly joyful sound and full-to-bursting Caribbean rhythms."

== Track listings ==
7"

- A: "Right by Your Side" (7" Version) - 3:52
- B: "Right by Your Side" (Party Mix) - 6:27

12"

- A: "Right by Your Side" (Extended Version)* - 12:25
- B1: "Right by Your Side" (Special Mix) - 0:59
- B2: "Plus Something Else" 5:30 ** (later released on the Remastered Re-Issue of the LP 'Touch' (2005)

* Simply titled "Right By Your Side" on the record, there is no indication on duration or version.

** This is an instrumental/dub mix of the song "Regrets", which opens with Dave saying "Well, that's enough of that. Here's something else." Another version of "Regrets", this time a 7'34 "vocal" remix can be found on the EP "Touch Dance" (1984; 12" and CD) - original version of the song "Regrets" from the LP "Touch" (1983).

== Versions ==
Special Mix - 0:59

- Opens with an announcement from Dave: "Hello. This is our hopefully Special Mix. Bye-bye." Then the first (approximately) 55 seconds of the album version plays before fading out.

7" Version - 3:52

- Essentially an edit of the album version, fading before the end sequence.

Album version - 4:46

- Only version with "white noise" bursts during the end sequence as the song fades out.

Party mix - 6:27

- Remix with additional electronic percussion effects and sax solo ending, edited down from full Extended Mix.

Extended Mix, a.k.a. SuperExtended Mix - 12:25

- Remix with additional electronic percussion effects, a much longer sax solo, and panted wordless vocalizing.

== Charts ==
=== Weekly charts ===
Weekly chart performance for "Right by Your Side"
Chart (1983–1984)	Peak position
Australia (Kent Music Report)	15
Belgium (Ultratop 50 Flanders)	31
Canada Top Singles (RPM)	39
Ireland (IRMA)	15
Netherlands (Dutch Top 40)	20
Netherlands (Single Top 100)	31
New Zealand (Recorded Music NZ)	9
Sweden (Sverigetopplistan)	13
UK Singles (Official Charts)	10
US Billboard Hot 100	29
US Adult Contemporary (Billboard)	39
US Dance Club Songs (Billboard)	32
US Cash Box Top 100 Singles	30
West Germany (GfK)	61

=== Year-end charts ===
Year-end chart performance for "Right by Your Side"
Chart (1984)	Position
Australia (Kent Music Report)	93
