= Belinda (song) =

Single by Eurythmics

from the album In The Garden
- B-side: "Heartbeat, Heartbeat"
- Released: 21 August 1981
- Recorded: 1981
- Studio: Conny's studio (Cologne, Germany)
- Genre: New wave
- Length: 3:58
- Label: RCA Records
- Songwriters: Annie Lennox and David A. Stewart,
- Producers: Conny Plank & Eurythmics

Eurythmics singles chronology
"Never Gonna Cry Again" (1981)	"Belinda" (1981)	"This Is the House" (1982)

Audio video
- "Belinda" on YouTube

"Belinda" is a 1981 music recording by the British new wave duo Eurythmics. It was the band's second single, and the second of two singles to be taken from their debut album In the Garden. The song was co-produced by Conny Plank and featured Robert Görl of D.A.F. and members of Can.

== Background ==
The single, which was released only in the UK, was not a commercial success and failed to chart. It received some airplay on BBC Radio 1 and Radio Luxembourg, and spent two weeks as a "breaker" on the Record Business Airplay Guide chart in August 1981. No music video was made for the single.

The B-side, "Heartbeat, Heartbeat" was exclusive to this single, though it was later included on the remastered version of In The Garden in 2005.

== Critical reception ==
Tony Jasper of Music Week noted the song's "pleasurable atmosphere" and "rhythmic nature", which was propelled by a "strong drum propulsion". Betty Page of Sounds saw no difference between Lennox and Stewart's previous band, the Tourists, and Eurythmics. She wrote, "They're still yearning to be the new Byrds, the jangles now given a rockier edge, but still those weak, distant, feathery vocals remain. It's travesty that Annie Lennox never uses her lungs properly – she had a great pop voice once."

== Track listing ==
UK 7"

1. Belinda (LP Version) – 4:01
2. Heartbeat Heartbeat (Non-LP Track) – 2:06

== Personnel ==
=== "Belinda" ===
- Ann Lennox – vocals, keyboards
- Dave Stewart – guitars, bass guitar
- Robert Görl – drums
- Holger Czukay – French horn

=== "Heartbeat, Heartbeat" ===
- Ann Lennox – vocals
- Dave Stewart – guitars, bass guitar
- Robert Görl – drums
- Jürgen Zeltinger – heart attack
- Jaki Liebezeit, Holger Czukay, Markus Stockhausen – brass
