= Peter Ashworth =

English photographer (born 1953)

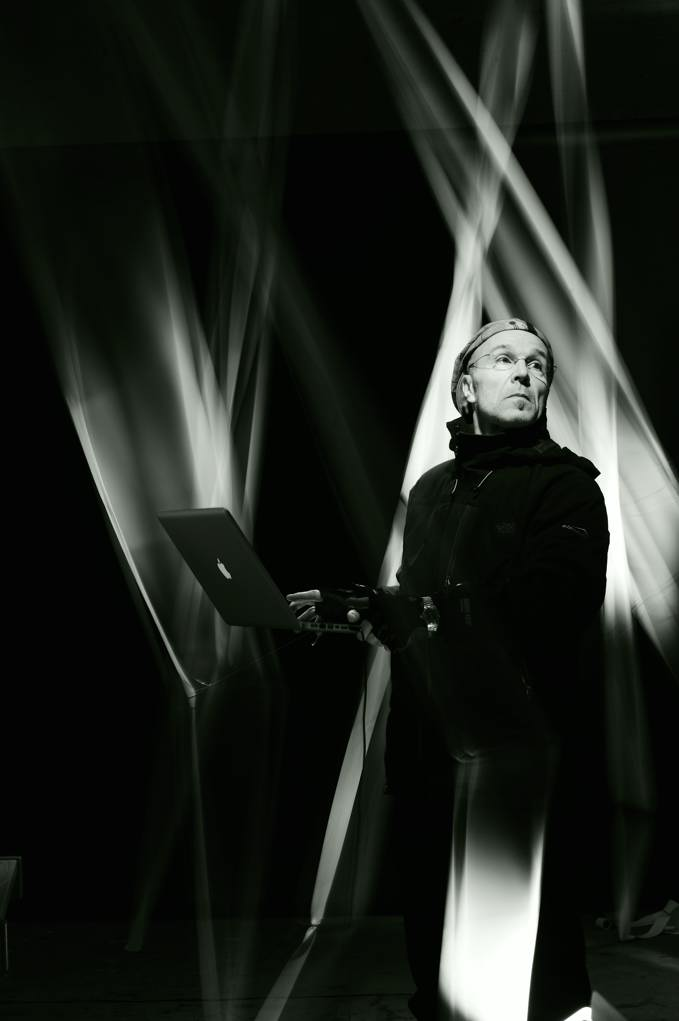
- Self-portrait 2011

Background information
- Born: Peter Ashworth; 1953 (age 72–73); England
- Genres: Photography
- Occupations: Photographer; musician
- Years active: 1979–present
- Website: Official website

Peter Ashworth (born 1953) is an English photographer. Ashworth initially specialized in music photography, between 1979 and 2000. In the 1980s, he worked with many UK and international music artists including The Smiths, Tina Turner, Depeche Mode, Eurythmics, Robert Palmer, Bryan Ferry, Soft Cell, Jimmy Page and The Associates.

He has also performed as a musician with various bands, including Marc and the Mambas (with Marc Almond), The Gadgets, and The The. In 1980, Ashworth—using his Triash pseudonym—was briefly a member of the band The The with Matt Johnson. In 1982–1983, he played drums as a member of Marc and the Mambas.

He now works predominantly in fashion and style/culture photography, working with fashion designers such as Stephen Jones, Basso & Brooke and Atsuko Kudo. He is known in part for his photography of fetish subjects, for creating sets and shooting on location using lighting techniques that explore the textures and cut of his subjects.

Ashworth's work is featured in The National Portrait Gallery permanent collection archive, consisting of twelve images: Adam and the Ants – Kings of the Wild Frontier; Annie Lennox – Eurythmics: Touch & Face to Face portrait; Frankie Goes to Hollywood – Welcome to the Pleasuredome; Soft Cell – "Bedsitter" and Non-Stop Erotic Cabaret; Associates – Sulk; Erasure – phone-booth; David Sylvian – portrait; Julian Cope – Saint Julian; Visage – debut sleeve; Steve Strange – portrait.

== Early life ==
In an interview with Dylan Jones for his book Sweet Dreams: From Club Culture to Style Culture: the Story of the New Romantics, Ashworth describes how after school he abandoned his earlier scientific studies and decided, without ever having taken a picture, to become a photographer. In 1976, he joined the London College of Printing, and during this time befriended Stephen Jones, who was at St Martin's College:

'It was a fantastic time to be in London. I didn't realise when I first came here, because the London I came to was a wreck of a place. I was horrified at the state of London. It looked like it was still in the Second World War, and everyone was in the doldrums. It just felt very grey and negative. It felt like I'd travelled back about five or ten years from Eastbourne, which was a relatively happy-go-lucky place. London was ugly but full of fascinating people.'

== Photography ==
One of Ashworth's inspirations as a photographer was British music photographer Brian Griffin. When writer Bill Brewster interviewed Ashworth, he said, 'He's a stunning photographer I learned how to light by seeing Brian's pictures and thinking, "These excite me".'

=== Music ===
Ashworth's work came to prominence in the 1980s when he worked with pop bands such as Dead or Alive, Soft Cell, Eurythmics and The Associates; rock artists such as The Clash, The Ramones, The Cult, Tina Turner, Julian Cope and The The; post-punk band PIL with John Lydon; 1980s-era New Romantic performers Visage and Steve Strange; and established artists such as Bryan Ferry.

Ashworth's images have been used on album and single covers of the artists he has photographed, including Adam & The Ants' Kings of the Wild Frontier, The Associates’ Sulk, Soft Cell's Non-Stop Erotic Cabaret, Frankie Goes to Hollywood's Welcome to the Pleasuredome, Visage's debut album Visage and Eurythmics' Touch.

During the National Portrait Gallery's reopening in 2023 after a three-year refurbishment, Ashworth's image of Lennox for the 'Touch' album was used as the gallery's advertising poster, and also featured in the reopening exhibition.

Unusually for a rock photographer, Ashworth worked mostly with the large, square format Hasselblad cameras because, as he reasoned, 'album covers are square'.

=== Fashion ===
Through his initial work with musicians and designers in the 1980s, Ashworth came into contact with fashion designers and moved into the area of fashion photography, working with designers such as British milliner Stephen Jones OBE, (both Ashworth and Jones working together with Visage and Steve Strange)) – Jones using Ashworth's portrait on his first business card in 1979.

Ashworth has also worked and with British fetish designers Murray and Vern, Basso & Brooke, and Atsuko Kudo. At the inception of the fetish club, Skin Two, one of its founders, Tim Woodward, asked Ashworth to photograph the event. In 1992, Ashworth photographed the ‘Skin Two Collection 3: Murray & Vern’ catalogue, art-directed and designed by Skin Two editor Tony Mitchell.

Ashworth's photographic work with the avant-garde performance artist and fashion model Leigh Bowery was featured in a 2012 celebration of Bowery's life entitled Xtravaganza: Staging Leigh Bowery that was held at the Kunsthalle Wien museum in Vienna, Austria.

== Musician ==
In 1980, Ashworth - using the pseudonym Triash – as briefly a member of the band The The with Matt Johnson, appearing on the single "Controversial Subject" as drummer and vocalist. In 1982–1983, he played drums as a member of Marc and the Mambas, appearing on their debut album Untitled and photographing the album's cover; and again as band percussionist and album photographer for their follow-up album, Torment and Toreros

Ashworth was also drummer in The The's Matt Johnson’s side project The Gadgets, who produced one album in 1983, The Blue Album.

== Other ==
The ubiquity of Ashworth's photographic work with music artists in the 1980s led to him being mentioned in Mari Wilson’s UK Top 10 hit song "Just What I Always Wanted". alongside his contemporary, the American spectral musical pioneer James Tenney.

== Exhibitions ==
=== Solo ===
- Mavericks - Lever Gallery, London, 2018.
- Mavericks Photographic Show - The Gallery, Liverpool, 2018

=== Contributor ===
- Street Style: From Sidewalk to Catwalk - V&A, London
- Hats: An Anthology by Stephen Jones - V&A, London
- Xtravaganza: Staging Leigh Bowery - Kunsthalle, Vienna (2012)
- The House of Annie Lennox - V&A, London (2012)
- Otherness - Louis Vuitton Gallery, Paris
- The Face Magazine: Culture Shift - Tate Modern, London (2025)
- Leigh Bowery! - Tate Modern, London (2025)

== Books ==
Contributor

- Fetish: Masterpieces of Erotic Fantasy Photography by Michelle Olley

== Selected album, EP and single cover photography ==
- Tar (Visage's first single, 1979)
- Kings of the Wild Frontier (Adam and the Ants, 1980)
- Visage (Visage, 1980)
- Non-Stop Erotic Cabaret (Soft Cell, 1981)
- Bedsitter (song) single (Soft Cell, 1981)
- In the Garden (Eurythmics, 1981)
- Careless Memories (Duran Duran's second single, 1981)
- Sticky George (The Korgies, 1981)
- Sulk (The Associates, 1982)
- Untitled (Marc and the Mambas, 1982)
- Uncertain Smile single (The The, 1982)
- Touch (Eurythmics, 1983)
- You Are in My System (Robert Palmer, 1983)
- In Strict Tempo (Dave Ball, 1983)
- Making History (Linton Kwesi Johnson, 1983)
- Doppelganger (Kid Creole and the Coconuts, 1983)
- Welcome To The Pleasuredome, (Frankie Goes To Hollywood, 1984)
- Vermin in Ermine (Marc Almond, 1984)
- Bananarama (Bananarama, 1984)
- Doctor! Doctor! (Thompson Twins, 1984)
- People Are People (Depeche Mode, 1984)
- Private Dancer (Tina Turner, 1984)
- Sophisticated Boom Boom (Dead Or Alive, 1984)
- No Jacket Required (Phil Collins, 1985)
- Addicted to Love (Robert Palmer, 1986)
- The Foolish Thing to Do (Heaven 17, 1986)
- Saint Julian (Julian Cope, 1987)
- Holy Water (The Triffids song) (The Triffids, 1987)
- Outrider (Jimmy Page, 1988)
- Malafemmina (Gianna Nannini, 1988)
- Different (Thomas Anders, 1989)
- Cloudcuckooland (The Lighting Seeds, 1992)
- Velveteen (Transvision Vamp, 1992)
- And Now the Legacy Begins (Dream Warriors, 1991)
- Blue Moons & Laughing Guitars (Bill Nelson, 1992)
- Devil Hopping (Inspiral Carpets, 1994)
- Das Ist Ein Groovy Beat, Ja (Jake Slazenger, 1996)
- Hearts and Knives (Visage, 2013)
- Late Night Tales: Röyksopp (various artists, 2013)
