= Colin McDowell =

British journalist and academic

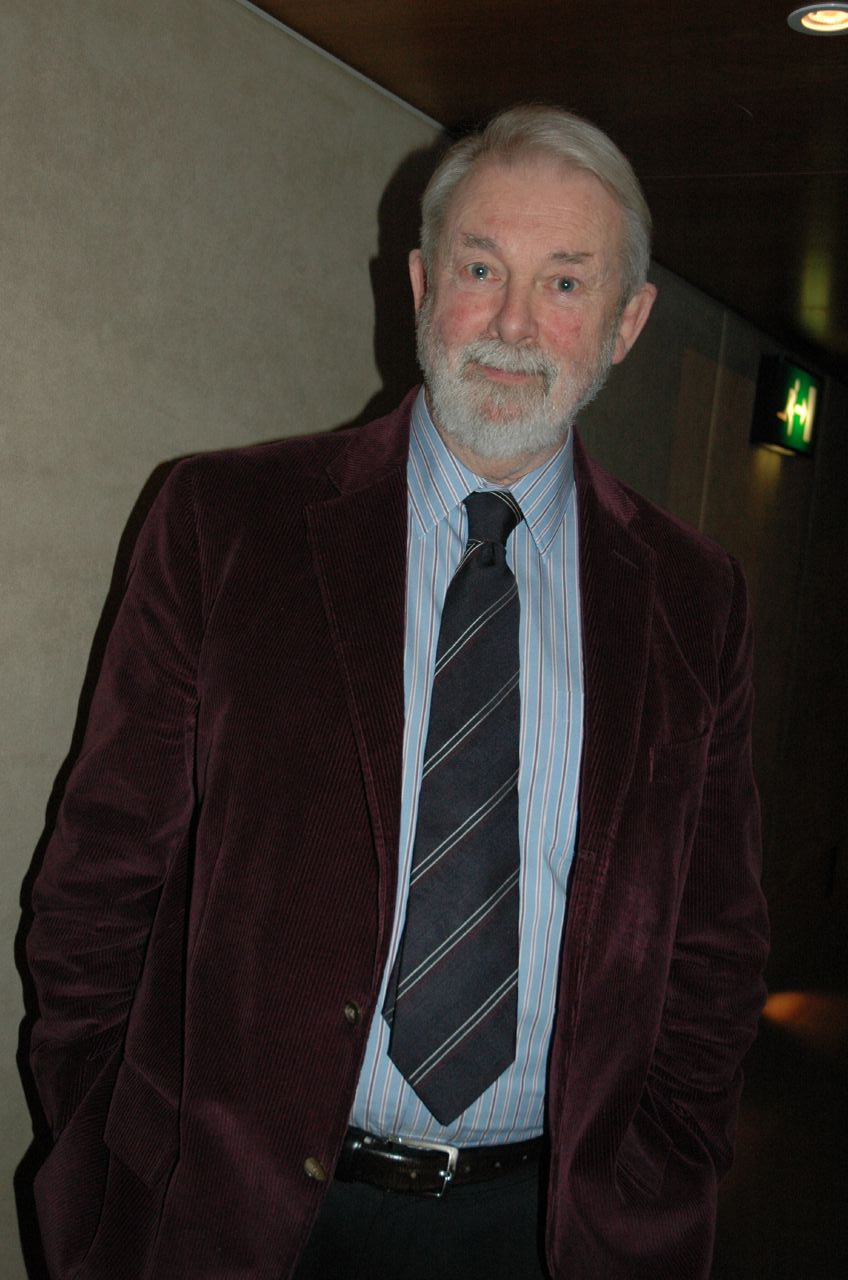
- Born: Colin Roxburgh McDowell; 21 June 1936 (age 90); Northumberland, England
- Education: Durham University (BA, Dip. Ed)
- Occupations: Fashion writer; designer; curator
- Employer: The Sunday Times
- Notable work: McDowell's Directory of Twentieth Century Fashion (1984)
- Awards: Member of the Order of the British Empire (2008)
- Military career
- Allegiance: United Kingdom
- Branch: British Army
- Rank: Captain
- Unit: Royal Army Educational Corps

Colin Roxburgh McDowell MBE FRSA (born 21 June 1936) is a British fashion writer, designer and curator.

He was fashion editor of The Sunday Times and has written numerous books on fashion history and contemporary designers.

== Early life and education ==
Born in Northumberland, McDowell moved from Alnwick to Gloucester at three years old. He developed a strong interest in modern art and architecture as a teenager. He was educated at Durham University, having turned down a place at Oxford because he wanted to return to the North East.

As a student in Durham he wrote for the university newspaper, Palatinate, alongside future Beatles biographer Hunter Davies, and produced the 'Film Notes' column – a review of recent cinema releases. He also rowed for the Hatfield College Boat Club and played fly half for the Durham University rugby team.

McDowell graduated with a degree in General Arts in 1957. He stayed an extra year in Durham to complete a Diploma of Education.

McDowell completed his National Service in the Royal Army Educational Corps, but later converted to a short-service commission. Attaining the rank of captain in 1963, he left active military service that October and transferred to the Regular Army Reserve of Officers.

== Career ==
=== Early career ===
McDowell taught history for a few years. Having lost his interest in teaching, he became an actor, appearing in several episodes of BBC Radio 4 soap opera The Archers and various TV bit-parts, usually as a generic foreigner. His social life brought him into contact with people in the fashion industry, and this inspired another change of career.

McDowell settled in Rome in the early 1970s when a friend offered him a design job. He later began working for the couturier Pino Lancetti, who taught him the art of Haute couture. He was subsequently employed by the National Chamber of Italian Fashion (Camera Nazionale della Moda Italiana), and Laura Biagiotti. At Biagiotti, he brokered an exclusive deal for the company to design uniforms for Alitalia.

=== Professional journalist ===
McDowell returned to London after spending 10 years in Rome. In 1984 he established his reputation as a writer with McDowell’s Directory of 20th Century Fashion, which became a standard reference work for fashion students. An article written for The Observer on Italian fashion led to invitations to write for other publications, and he began to focus on his emerging journalism career. He was appointed a fashion reporter for The Sunday Times in 1986.

In 1989, while on assignment in Cairo, McDowell escaped a fire at the Sheraton Heliopolis Hotel by jumping from a second-floor window, breaking his ankle. Three people were killed, including his friend and colleague Jackie Moore. To aid his recovery from the trauma he returned to Northumberland and rented a holiday cottage with a view of Lindisfarne, and wrote the novels A Woman of Style and A Woman of Spirit.

As his journalism career progressed, McDowell earned a reputation as a combative and independent-minded fashion critic. His "proudest moment" came when Giorgio Armani threatened to pull his advertising from The Sunday Times (at £50,000 a page) because McDowell had given one of his shows a bad review. He claims to have been banned from more fashion shows than any other writer. Alongside his newspaper work he continued to write books on the modern fashion industry and biographies of notable designers, including John Galliano, Manolo Blahnik and Ralph Lauren.

=== Later work ===
In 2003 McDowell set up 'Fashion Fringe', an annual competition to uncover promising fashion design talent and offer them professional mentorship. The initiative helped launch the careers of several designers, including Basso & Brooke, the inaugural winners in 2004, and Erdem Moralıoğlu, who won the following year. Owing to difficulties securing continued sponsorship, the scheme ended in 2013.

In 2008, McDowell served as editor-in-chief of short-lived fashion and style magazine, Distill. Reflecting on his career in a 2015 interview, he criticised what he regarded as the declining independence of contemporary fashion journalism, arguing that access to shows and a good seat allocation had become increasingly dependent on favourable coverage.

== Personal ==
As of 2015, McDowell was a resident of Soho, also maintaining a second home "in the country".

In addition to his interests in fashion and art, he has a long-standing passion for classical music.

== Honours ==
McDowell was made an MBE in 2008 for services to the fashion industry. He has received honorary doctorates from Heriot-Watt University and the University of Huddersfield.

== Selected publications ==
=== Non-fiction ===
- McDowell's Directory of Twentieth Century Fashion. London: Frederick Muller. 1984. ISBN 9780584110708.
- A Hundred Years of Royal Style. London: Muller, Blond & White. 1985. ISBN 9780584110715.
- Everywoman's Guide to Looking Good. London: Muller, Blond & White. 1986. ISBN 9780584111156.
- Shoes: Fashion and Fantasy. London: Thames & Hudson. 1989. ISBN 9780500014691.
- Hats: Status, Style and Glamour. London: Thames & Hudson. 1992. ISBN 9780500015469.
- Dressed to Kill: Sex, Power and Clothes. London: Hutchinson. 1992. ISBN 9780091744649.
- The Designer Scam. London: Hutchinson. 1994. ISBN 9780091776121.
- Galliano. London: Weidenfeld & Nicolson. 1997. ISBN 9780297819387.
- Forties Fashion and the New Look. London: Bloomsbury. 1997. ISBN 9780747530329.
- The Man of Fashion: Peacock Males and Perfect Gentlemen. London: Thames & Hudson. 1997. ISBN 9780500017975.
- Manolo Blahnik. London: Cassell & Co. 2000. ISBN 9780304354115.
- Jean Paul Gaultier. London: Cassell & Co. 2000. ISBN 9780304358793.
- Ralph Lauren: The Man, the Vision, the Style. London: Cassell Illustrated. 2002. ISBN 9780304356485.
- The Anatomy of Fashion: Why We Dress the Way We Do. London: Phaidon Press. 2013. ISBN 9780714849478.

=== Fiction ===
- A Woman of Style. London: Rowan. 1992. ISBN 9780099957201.
- A Woman of Spirit. London: Sinclair-Stevenson. 1993. ISBN 9781856192057.
