= Tatty Devine =

Brand name for a jewellery company

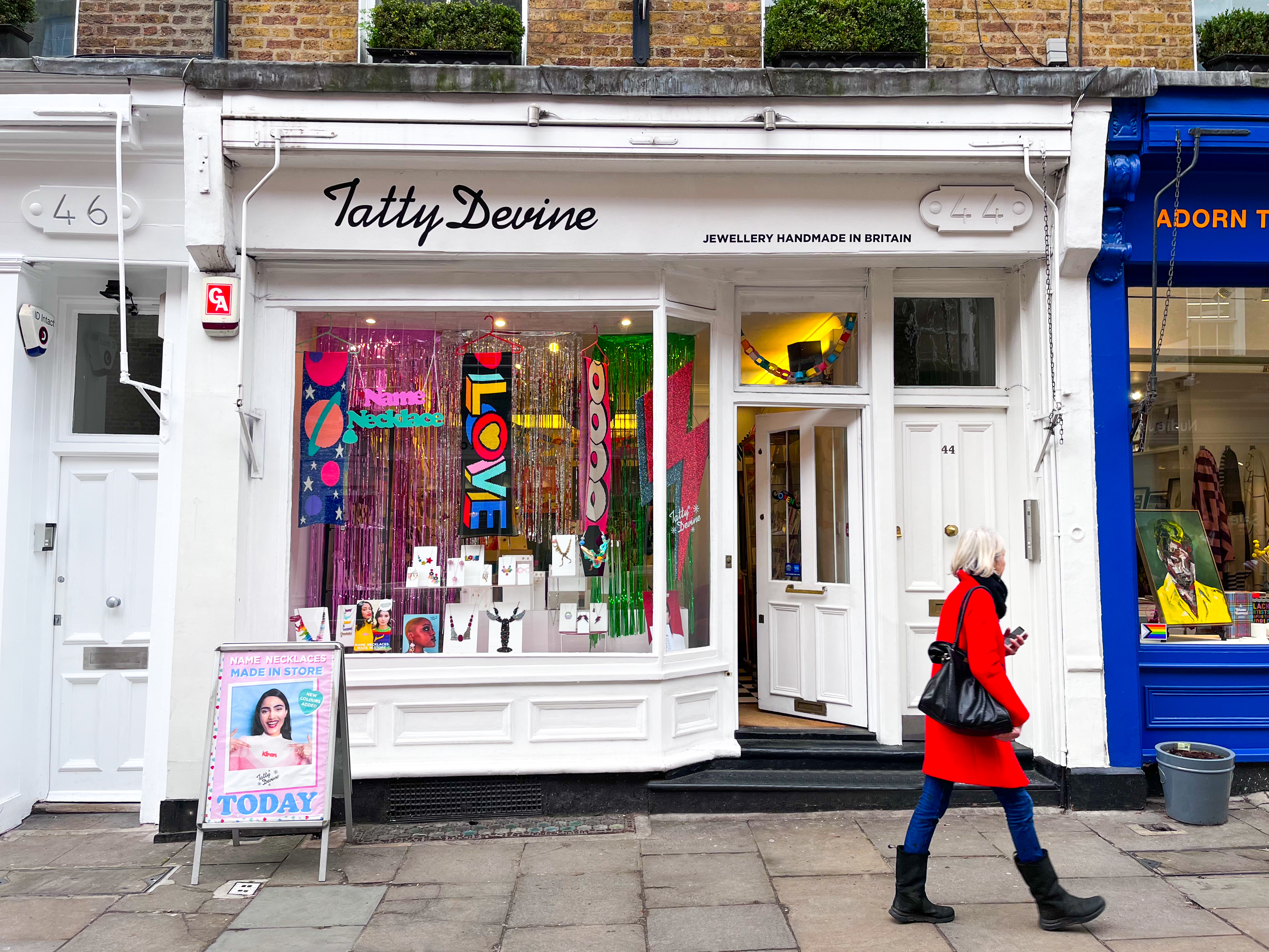
Tatty Devine, 36 Neal Street, Covent Garden, WC2H 9PS

Tatty Devine is a brand name for a jewellery company based in the East End of London, owned by Rosie Wolfenden and Harriet Vine who established the company in 1999. They have one shop in London's Covent Garden, situated on Neal Street. They make laser cut acrylic-based art jewellery which is handmade in the UK and personalised Name Necklaces, laser cut and handmade to order. In 2013, Rosie Wolfenden and Harriet Vine were awarded MBEs for Services to the Fashion Industry.

== History ==
Tatty Devine started out in London's Portobello and Spitalfields market selling leather cuffs. They then began to make their name from making jewellery from found objects like cake decorations and guitar plectrums. After featuring in Vogue magazine and showing their collections at London Fashion Week they opened a studio and shop space on London's Brick Lane, later followed by a shop in Brewer Street, Soho, which moved to Monmouth Street, Covent Garden in November 2009 and now is located on Neal Street in Covent Garden since November 2023.

== Collaborations ==
Tatty Devine have collaborated with musicians such as David Bowie, Peaches, Belle & Sebastian, Camera Obscura, Los Bitchos, Robots in Disguise and the Amy Winehouse Foundation including producing exclusive tour merchandise and charitable products.

They have designed ranges for the Tate galleries across the UK, Victoria and Albert Museum, South Bank, Design Museum, Barbican Centre, the Baltic Gateshead where Tatty Devine created 'Angel of the North' jewellery for artist Anthony Gormley and capsule collections with Chawton House, Brighton's Royal Pavilion, Sir John Soane's Museum. Limited pieces have also been made with heroines of the art world, from Frida Kahlo to contemporary illustrator, Gemma Correll, technicolour muralist, Morag Myerscough, papercut specialist Poppy's Papercuts, and home-grown favourites including Mark Pawson and Rob Ryan, and Basso & Brooke.

Designers Peter Jensen, Ashish, Eley Kishimoto, Mimi Wade, Clio Peppiatt, Claire Barrow, Kit Neale, Matty Bovan, Mary Benson, The Rodnik Band, Basso and Brooke, Louise Gray and SIBLING have worked with Tatty Devine on their fashion collections, alongside lifestyle collaborations with MADE.com, Mi-Pac, MAKE International and Wild and Wolf.

The De Young Gallery in San Francisco commissioned Tatty Devine to design a collection of jewellery celebrating British Artists Gilbert & George to coincide with the Gilbert and George exhibition at the gallery. The pieces are based on well known Gilbert and George art works and the collection includes Gin Cufflinks, Hope and Fear Brooches and Necklaces.

Tatty Devine also made iconic London department store Selfridges' 100th birthday cake which was 'cut' by London Mayor Boris Johnson.

Tatty Devine has also explored beloved characters in pop-culture, reimagining cult icons from Peanuts and Moomin as collectable art jewellery.

== Collections ==
Tatty Devine produces up to five collections a year as well as a 'Classic' collection, which features cult pieces from previous years and a limited edition Spring/Summer and Autumn/Winter collection.

Their first collection was called Come Dancing which was a range of charm belts inspired by equestrian activities. The first major collection was called Wish You Were Here which was shown at London fashion week. It was inspired by the 1970s and UK pop culture, and included items such as a Rubik's Cube, bracelets and hair bands.

Welcome to Hotel Tatty in 2003 was Tatty Devine's first clothing range which featured their first collection of perspex jewellery. It also featured plectrum bracelets which they still sell today, as well as rosette brooches and tape measure belts. A second clothing range Unreal Life followed in the Autumn/Winter 2003. The collection was shown at Fashion East, an initiative set up by Lulu Kennedy in September 2000 as an off-schedule London Fashion Week event, created to provide a springboard for three young designers each year.

In 2004 Tatty Devine created 'Join The Circus' which included pieces they still make today including the Trapeze Necklace and their signature Dinosaur Necklace. Their friend and artist Rob Ryan screen printed a small selection of clothing with price tickets printed on.

In 2005 Tatty Devine experimented with solid silver, enamel, and diamonds in the shapes of plectrums, swallows, and shoes. Nautical pieces featured in the Spring/Summer collection with themes of treasure, sea creatures, and compasses. The Intergalactic Hedgerows collection was inspired by outer space, and the great outdoors. Wooden animals, autumn leaves and berries, spacemen, and star constellations featured heavily in the range for Autumn/Winter 2006/2007.

Colour Me In for spring 2007, was a collection reminiscent of growing up with colour, games, rollercoasters, patchwork and kisses. Dark Stages came out for the Autumn/Winter of 2007. It featured again circus themes, with tigers and magic, as well as disco elements. Medieval inspiration also featured with Knights in Shining Armour Necklaces, feather tips, wooden arrows, and plumage.

Movie Mayhem followed Dark Stages with popcorn beads, Lolita glasses, and 3D glasses that really work as well as being an accessories. The designers Harriet and Rosie were inspired by giant things which became the inspirations behind Autumns 2008 collection, Attack Of The 50 ft Jewellery. It featured giant zips, ink splats, and pencils.

In 2009 two collections were produced: Leisure Pursuits, which had plimsolls, ping pongs, and telephones all turned into jewellery; later on in the year, Button Up which was inspired by the Pearly Kings and Queens of East London, where Tatty Devine are based. They worked with the Pearlies and donated A Pound to the Pearlies for every pearly man brooch and necklace sold.

In 2010 Tatty Devine created Sundae Best, their Spring/Summer 2010 collection, which featured fans, doily hearts, cocktail umbrellas, anchors, and bunting. The following collection for autumn/winter 2010, The Age of Blazing Trails, was inspired by the Wild West, saloons and firework displays, featuring crystal studded and inked firework explosions and fringed accessories.

In 2011 Tatty Devine was inspired by light, legend and luxury: exploring chunky quartz-style gems, rainbows, halcyon moons, sparkling hummingbirds and mystical unicorns. Their autumn collection referenced the art of craft, with acrylic patchwork arrangements, cosy foxes, wise owls and leather accessories mimicking the detailing on brogue shoes.

In 2012 Tatty Devine looked to warmer climes as mirror parakeets were joined by delicate Mexican-inspired lacework, juicy slices of melon and charm-heavy 'junk' jewellery. This was followed by an Autumn/Winter collection which featured contrasting town and country mice, witty miniature printed willow pattern plate adornments, crystal studded paisleys, moths and German gingerbread.

In 2013 Tatty Devine experimented with exuberant shades of acrylic including iridescent and neon, to create strands of lotus buds, elephants, geometric arrangements and hot house leaves. Their following Autumn/Winter collection saw them join the space race with delicate beaded constellations, Peter Max-style pop art lettering, shimmering la luna and avant-garde robots and gems.

In 2014 Tatty Devine released their Spring/Summer collection which drew on retro futuristic space modules, hyper real printed conch shells, opalescent beach-finds and hand moulded iridescent bubbles - continuing to push beyond the boundaries of traditional jewellery design. This was followed by an otherworldly Autumn/Winter collection, heavily influenced by the occult: seance hands, geometric patterns picked out in autumnal tones of Formica laminate and wood, shimmering 3D crystal balls and a wearable tessellating hall of mirrors.

In 2015 Tatty Devine celebrated Spring/Summer with a contemporary take on traditional Tudor houses: reimagined in a tactile range of glossy acrylic and wood and accompanied by ground-breaking floral statements and intricate lacework-style dragonflies. Later on in the year, Rosie and Harriet were inspired by the Memphis Group, revealing their take on colour pop everyday items: from 80s style printed collage collars to statement pot plants and irreverent nods to domesticity: crystal-studded iron jewellery.

In 2016 Tatty Devine shot their Skies of Antiquity collection on location in Rome, which served as inspiration for the jewellery's architectural inspiration: bubblegum pink layered arches, marble print balconies, intricate odes to the Trevi fountain complete with miniature coins and delicate pastel vases. This was followed by Play The Part, their Autumn/Winter collection which took its cue from classical ballet, oversized craft work, statement crystal-studded swans and fairy tale landscapes.

In 2017 Tatty Devine debuted The Art of Wasting Time, their Spring/Summercollection which heavily referenced Valley of the Dolls, delicate florals and colour pop pill capsules, etched with the brand's then Brick Lane store number. In autumn winter, Rosie and Harriet drew on witchcraft, fairy tales and female power in She Put A Spell On You, which was photographed on location in Cornwall's, Museum of Witchcraft and Magic.

In 2018 Tatty Devine turned to spring florals, British wildlife, delicate ribbon motifs and a pastel palette with their exuberant collection: Spring Forth and Break Through. Autumn/Winter saw the debut of their mystical collection, Liminal Fantasy, an exploration of dream-like states, celestial symbols, fantasy fiction and folklore, which was shot on location in Baggins Book Bazaar, England's largest secondhand book shop.

In 2019 Tatty Devine launched their Spring/Summer collection, Flamingo-A-Go-Go: a love letter to master of kitsch John Waters. Pearlescent flamingo motifs joined high-camp pastel leopards, glossy lipsticks and iconic eye make up in their most striking collection yet. This was followed by Everything Is Everything, a 70s-hued Autumn/Winter collection which referenced everything from metallic string art to colourful spider diagrams and mesmerizing mathematical sequences.

In 2020 Tatty Devine released their sun kissed Spring/Summer collection, Bloom Boom, composed entirely of floral designs, from dahlias to daisies and flowering sweet peas, utilising Duchess satin, beads and laser cut acrylic to create their most ambitious ensemble yet. Their Autumn/Winter collection, Desire Paths, drew inspiration from folklore, woodland, and celestial skies to craft intricate dandelion clocks, rose hips and constellations.

In 2021 Tatty Devine released Held By Many Hands, a tribute to the essence of women and goddesses across the world, from prehistory to the present day. The Spring/Summer collection featured references to including glistening 3D scallop shells as a nod to Botticelli's The Birth of Venus. This was followed by the collection, I'm Only Dreaming, their Autumn/Winter collection which took its name from the exploration of dreams and the pursuit of sleep itself: jewel tone sleeping pills, ethereal planets, glitter flecked 'zzzs' and intricate moths, as worn in The Guardian by Lady Hale.

In 2022 Tatty Devine was inspired by reconnecting with nature and finding your inner animal, resulting in the riotous collection, Wild Things. Beginning with a pastel bright chameleon inspired by the Ishihara Test, lush prayer plant leaves and fierce lionesses followed as Rosie and Harriet explored hot-off-the-press shades of acrylic while continued to push boundaries within contemporary jewellery design. Their Autumn/Winter collection, Cabinet of Curiosities, delved into collections, from entomology to ornithology and the women whose work shaped scientific knowledge today: from Mary Delany to Margaret Bentinck's The Hive.
