= Das Ist Ein Groovy Beat, Ja =

- Cover photography by Peter Ashworth

Studio album by Jake Slazenger
- Released: 8 July 1996
- Recorded: Planet μ
- Label: Warp
- Producer: Mike Paradinas

Jake Slazenger chronology
Nautilus (1996)	Das Ist Ein Groovy Beat, Ja (1996)

Das Ist Ein Groovy Beat, Ja is an album by Mike Paradinas, released in 1996 under his nickname Jake Slazenger.

== Production ==
The album was recorded at the studio Planet μ.

== Release ==
Das Ist Ein Groovy Beat, Ja was released in the United Kingdom by Warp on 8 July 1996 as compact disc, double vinyl and cassette.

The title is German for "This is a groovy beat, yes."

== Reception ==
The Guardian gave the album a two star rating, calling it "a deliberately dated trawl of seventies and eighties electro" and saying that the album "gets bogged down in exactly the same swamp of tedium that mired the original work of Herbie Hancock et al. It's clever and knowledgeable, but highly unsatisfying." AllMusic gave the album a two and half star rating out of five, "much more subdued than the usual techno-racket μ-Ziq is known for" and compared the album to Paradinas' first Slazenger album which "explored early-'80s electro -- that's all here as well (and it sounds just as dated)". The review concluded, "It makes one wonder whether an artist can be experimental and enjoyable when using all this cringe-worthy synth, but in the end, Paradinas pulls it off."

== Track listing ==
All tracks written by Mike Paradinas.

1. "Hung Like a Bull" – 6:50
2. "Supafunk" – 5:19
3. "The Big Easy" – 5:25
4. "Lumpback Raider" – 5:46
5. "Nautilus" – 6:20
6. "King of the Beats" – 6:09
7. "Gratuit" – 7:27
8. "Choin" – 7:16
9. "Sabbaf" – 5:20
10. "Hot Fumes" – 3:13
11. "Come on You Slaz" – 6:19
12. "Slowdance" – 7:48

== Credits ==
Credited adapted from the Das Ist Ein Groovy Beat, Ja liner notes.

- Mike Paradinas – writer, producer, engineer
- Paul Solomons – cuts, editing
- mitDR UK'96 – design
- Lord Peter Ashworth – photography
