= Love Is a Stranger =

- Picture sleeve of original 1980s UK and US releases

Single by Eurythmics

from the album Sweet Dreams (Are Made of This)
- B-side: "Monkey Monkey"
- Released: 8 October 1982
- Recorded: 1982
- Genre: Synth-pop
- Length: 3:43
- Label: RCA
- Songwriters: Annie Lennox; David A. Stewart
- Producers: David A. Stewart; Adam Williams

Eurythmics singles chronology
"The Walk" (1982)	"Love Is a Stranger" (1982)	"Sweet Dreams (Are Made of This)" (1983)
"Sweet Dreams (Are Made of This)" (1983)	"Love Is a Stranger" (reissue) (1983)	"Who's That Girl?" (1983)
"(My My) Baby's Gonna Cry" (1990)	"Love Is a Stranger" (2nd reissue) (1991)	"Sweet Dreams (Are Made of This) '91" (remix) (1991)

Music video
- "Love Is a Stranger" on YouTube

"Love Is a Stranger" is a song by the British pop duo Eurythmics. It is the opening track off their second album, Sweet Dreams (Are Made of This) (1983). Originally released in October 1982 by RCA Records, the single peaked outside the top 50 in the UK, but it was re-released in 1983, reaching the top 20 in several countries, including number six in the UK. The single was re-released again in 1991, to promote Eurythmics' Greatest Hits album.

Both the 7-inch single and the 12-inch single were backed by "Monkey Monkey" as a B-side; the 12-inch single also included "Let's Just Close Our Eyes", a song that borrowed musical elements from "The Walk", which was the second single from Sweet Dreams (Are Made of This).

== Background ==
"Love Is a Stranger" was created around nine months prior to its initial release as a single. During the song's first chart run, Dave Stewart began to receive requests from musicians such as Billy MacKenzie to produce their records.

Lennox sought to encapsulate the dichotomy of love and hatred when writing the lyrics to "Love is a Stranger". She explained that her goal was to "put opposites together, because love and hate are so close to each other." Stewart assembled the track by playing eighth notes on a Roland synthesiser and a drum machine pattern with a repeating sixteenth note figure on a programmed hi-hat. He then accentuated certain passages with an Omnichord to create an electronic harp sound. Stewart said that the composition already "sounded eerily complete" at this stage, even before the addition of Lennox's lead vocals, which were completed in one take. After some guitar overdubs, he then recorded various grunts and breathing sounds because he felt that it "just seemed like a good idea at the time."

== Commercial performance ==
Originally released in October 1982 in the United Kingdom, "Love Is a Stranger" debuted on the UK Singles Charts at number 70 for the week dated 20 November 1982. It peaked at number 54 two weeks later and spent five weeks in the top 75 during its initial chart run. Following the success of "Sweet Dreams (Are Made of This)" the following year, the song was re-released and reached number six in April 1983. In the United States, the song was the second single from the Sweet Dreams (Are Made of This) album. The single was released just as the album title track reached number one, entering the Billboard Hot 100 at number 81 in September 1983 and peaking at number 23 in November of that year. The song spent 13 weeks on the chart.

== Music video ==
The single release was accompanied by a music video directed by Mike Brady, in which Stewart acts as chauffeur for Lennox, who plays the role of a high-class prostitute. Lennox removes a curly blonde wig to reveal much shorter red hair, though slicked back rather than the buzz cut seen in the subsequent music video for "Sweet Dreams (Are Made of This)". The video caused minor controversy in the USA, as some people mistakenly thought Lennox was a male cross-dresser. In one instance, MTV imposed a blackout during its transmission because they disapproved of the wig removal scene. MTV producers later telexed RCA Records for a copy of Lennox's birth certificate and accused her of being a transvestite.

== Critical reception ==
Cash Box said that "the commanding vocals of Annie Lennox and hazy, electronically inflected backing combine to make 'Love Is a Stranger' a challenging yet already familiar sound." David Hepworth of Smash Hits felt the song effectively integrated Lennox's "cultured" vocals into a modern musical arrangement.

In a retrospective review, AllMusic's Stewart Mason described "Love Is a Stranger" as "the most melodic of Eurythmics' early singles" and "a striking departure from the artsy, krautrock-inspired progressive pop of 1981's In the Garden". Mason lauded the song's chorus as one of the band's finest, while likening its "catchy, almost playful" synthesizers to those of Orchestral Manoeuvres in the Dark's "Enola Gay" (1980). The Guardian and Stereogum ranked "Love Is a Stranger" number one and number two respectively on their lists of the greatest Annie Lennox songs.

== Track listings ==
- 7-inch single

A. "Love Is a Stranger" (LP version) – 3:43
B. "Monkey Monkey" (Non-LP track) – 5:20

- 12-inch single

A1. "Love Is a Stranger" (LP version) – 3:43
B1. "Let's Just Close Our Eyes" (Non-LP track) – 4:19
B2. "Monkey Monkey" (Non-LP track) – 5:20

Note: "Let's Just Close Our Eyes" is a newly recorded version of "The Walk" with a more synth-oriented instrumentation.

- 7-inch single (1991 reissue)

A. "Love Is A Stranger" (LP version) – 3:43
B. "Julia" (Edit) – 4:05

- 12-inch single (1991 reissue)

A1. "Love Is A Stranger" (The Obsession Remix) 6:32
A2. "Love Is A Stranger" (J.C. Meets The Obsessor) – 6:34
B1. "Love Is A Stranger" (Cold Cut Remix) – 7:17
B2. "Love Is A Stranger" (The Obsession Instrumental) – 6:07
B3. "Love Is A Stranger" (LP version) – 3:43

- CD single (1991 reissue)
1. "Love Is A Stranger" (LP version) – 3:43
2. "There Must Be An Angel (Playing With My Heart)" – 5:23
3. "Julia" (Edit) – 4:05
4. "Love Is A Stranger" (The Obsession Remix) – 6:30

== Charts ==
=== Weekly charts ===
Weekly chart performance for "Love Is a Stranger" (original release)
Chart (1982)	Peak position
UK Singles (Official Charts)	54

Weekly chart performance for "Love Is a Stranger" (1983 release)
Chart (1983)	Peak position
Australia (Kent Music Report)	17
Belgium (Ultratop 50 Flanders)	6
Canada Top Singles (RPM)	15
Ireland (IRMA)	4
Netherlands (Dutch Top 40)	13
Netherlands (Single Top 100)	12
New Zealand (Recorded Music NZ)	20
South Africa (Springbok Radio)	2
UK Singles (Official Charts)	6
US Billboard Hot 100	23
US Dance Club Songs (Billboard)	7
US Cash Box Top 100	24
West Germany (GfK)	12

Weekly chart performance for "Love Is a Stranger" (1991 reissue)
Chart (1991)	Peak position
Australia (ARIA)	156
UK Singles (Official Charts)	46
UK Airplay (Music Week)	57

=== Year-end charts ===
Year-end chart performance for "Love Is a Stranger"
Chart (1983)	Position
West Germany (Official German Charts)	47
