= Murray and Vern =

UK design house

- Company type: Privately held
- Industry: Fashion, design
- Founded: January 1, 1984
- Founder: Angela Murray, Stuart Vern
- Headquarters: London, UK
- Key people: Stuart Vern, Angela Murray
- Products: Clothing
- Website: www.murrayandvern.com

Murray and Vern is an English design house and clothing retail company whose work is held in the permanent collection of the V&A Museum. and has been photographed by British documentarian Derek Ridgers and music/fashion photographer Peter Ashworth. Self-described as bringing ‘the design and imagery of latex clothing into the world of mainstream culture' for UK fashion, which also included television and film work, notably the opening sequence of the James Bond film The World is Not Enough. Because of their early adoption of latex they are regarded as one of the pioneers at bringing the fetish aesthetic to the mainstream fashion world. Murray and Vern have design pieces in the permanent collection of the V&A Museum Their work is known for also incorporating elements from the dance club scene, gay community, fetish world and performance art culture.

== History ==
Murray & Vern was founded in 1984 by English designers Angela Murray and Stuart Vern, initially working from their workshop in Whitworth Street, Manchester in the hub of the city’s then gay/club scene, including bar Manto and the clubs Paradise Factory and The Hacienda. Throughout the eighties and nineties, the design house continued to trade from their base in Manchester, opening their first shop in Afflecks Palace and later Kensington Market.

The first Murray & Vern catalogues were called PURE and designed by The Designers Republic, taking its name from the duo’s Pure diffusion range. and their collections featured in Skin Two magazine.

In 1992, Murray & Vern held a fashion show named ’Fags And Slags’ at The Hacienda's then-monthly gay night, ‘Flesh’, using their friends, performers and models from the London and Manchester club scene, such as fashion designer Pam Hogg and performance artist The Divine David (David Hoyle), DJ Paulette, performance artists Matthew Glamourre and Nicola Bowery, and photographer Lee Baxter. The fashion show then toured the UK, finally ending with a show at the Rubber Ball fetish night at the Hammersmith Palais.

In the same year Murray and Vern were cited by ID Magazine as one of the 100 most influential designers in the world, and their designs were stocked by Sign of the Times and Kim West in London, Geese in Manchester and Patricia Field in New York. In 1994 they moved from their studio in Whitworth Street in Manchester to London. The label's work saw them featured in the V&A ‘Streetstyle’ exhibition and accompanying book, and The V&A also produced postcards of their designs photographed by Peter Ashworth.

The late nineties saw the saw the label hold fashion shows at Ministry of Sound in London, the show featuring a performance by Minty, featuring Nicola Bowery and Matthew Glamoure; debut an independent cinema ad for the label by director Carrie Kirkpatrick; and collaborate with The Designers Republic to produce a brochure titled ‘Murray and Vern Vs The Designers Republic’, which was sold through Foyles and Tate Modern.

The decade also saw the label host performance and club nights such as ‘Naked and Famous’ at The 333 Club in Old Street, London; and ‘Absinthe, Ketamine and Guns’ at The Strongroom, a Jamie Reid designed studio, at which an Irvine Welsh written piece was performed. Their Brewer Street, Soho, shop display in 1999 was photographed by well-known London photographer Derek Ridgers. The 2000s saw Murray and Vern present a series of fashion and performance club nights with contributions from Simon Hoare, Tania Glyde and Michelle Olley, and also open a London shop in Camden. They later exhibited at the Fashion Institute of Technology in New York in the show ‘The Corset: Fashioning The Body’.

Murray and Vern launched their website in 1998 and the year 2000 saw them featured as i-D website of the month and also featured on Channel 4's Big Breakfast hosted by Denise Van Outen.

The label ceased to trade in 2002 and Angela Murray later graduated in both counselling and photography; Stuart Vern continued to design with PURE, the M&V diffusion range label, and Vern also moved into film set design.

In 2023, Murray and Vern began working together again on both archive and new designs for the Murray & Vern label.

2024 Murray and Vern feature in the book, ‘The Hacienda - Threads’ ‘A Celebration of Music, Fashion and Friendship’ and in support of the publication, Angela Murray took part in a round table panel discussion on the Manchester scene, alongside fellow panel members Noel Gallagher, Peter Hook, David Hoyle, Ang Matthews, Graeme Park, Paul Cons, Greg Wilson and Ian Griffiths, discussing the cultural history and relevance of The Hacienda. ‘Transgression in the UK’ by Toby Mott was also released the same year and included images and quotes from Murray and Vern

== Film Shoots/Ad Campaigns ==
Murray & Vern designs have been used in various films and advertisements, including: the opening credits of the 1999 James Bond film The World Is Not Enough (latex catsuits); the 2012 advertisement for Baileys (principle costume); Italian shoemaker Inniu’s ad campaign (custom costumes; shot by Nic Gaunt); and the 2017 science fiction film, Beyond Skyline (latex set dressing).

Murray & Vern clothing has been shot by various photographers, including British documentarian Derek Ridgers and music/fashion photographer Peter Ashworth, for their collection 'Pain is a close-up/happiness a long shot’; Ashworth also shot what became regarded as an iconic fetish image of a model on a spiked sofa and wearing a Murray and Vern catsuit for the front cover of their 1992 catalogue.

== Museum Collections ==
Murray & Vern designs are held in the permanent collection of the V&A, London, including a red safety pin dress from the ‘Street Style exhibition 1994-95’, lime green latex rubber stockings (1994) and silver rubber stockings (1994).

== Design Collections ==
All Murray & Vern's lines were designed by the founders, Angela Murray and Stuart Vern.

== Retail ==
Murray & Vern's designs are sold online through their official website or via select outlets, and vintage Murray and Vern pieces are sought after by collectors.

== See also ==
- List of companies of the United Kingdom K–Z
