= Never Gonna Cry Again =

Single by Eurythmics

from the album In the Garden
- B-side: "Le Sinestre"
- Released: 5 June 1981
- Recorded: 1981
- Studio: Conny Plank's studio
- Genre: New wave
- Length: 3:02
- Label: RCA Records
- Songwriters: Annie Lennox and David A. Stewart
- Producers: Conny Plank & Eurythmics

Eurythmics singles chronology
"Never Gonna Cry Again" (1981)	"Belinda" (1981)

Audio video
- "Never Gonna Cry Again" on YouTube

"Never Gonna Cry Again" is the debut single by the British new wave duo Eurythmics, released in 1981. It was taken from their debut album In the Garden. Co-produced by krautrock producer Conny Plank, the track also featured two members of the krautrock band Can. The sleeve design of the single features a picture of Annie Lennox.

== Background ==
The single was a minor commercial success, peaking at number 63 for two weeks in the UK. It was the only single from Eurythmics' first album to chart. A music video was filmed to accompany the release of the single.

"Never Gonna Cry Again" contains a flute solo performed by Lennox, one of the few times that she was to use the instrument in her pop career despite having studied it at the prestigious Royal College of Music in London in the 1970s.

The single's B-side, "Le Sinistre", is an experimental piece, featuring musical arrangements similar to those used in horror film scores.

== Music video ==
Never Gonna Cry Again was the first Eurythmics single to also have a promotional video. Filmed in February 1981 along the English South Coast, the video features a surreal tea party on the beach, prefaced by shots of Lennox emerging from the sea completely dry (achieved by reversing the film).

Although Lennox (a classically trained flautist) played flute on the recording, the video shows Holger Czukay miming the flute part. In addition to Czukay, the video also features Jaki Liebezeit (like Czukay, from the band Can). Both Czukay and Liebezeit contributed to the original recording as session players. As Czukay and Liebezeit were not members of the British Musicians' Union, the video was unable to be shown on British TV. The entire promo clip has to this date never been included in any official Eurythmics video release.

The shots of Lennox emerging in reverse from the water were later included on the Sweet Dreams (Are Made Of This) video album, where they were intercut with a live performance of the song "Jennifer".

The low chart placement of the single meant that no video was produced for follow-up single "Belinda", which performed even worse on the UK Singles Charts.

== Critical reception ==
Upon its release, Tony Jasper of Music Week noted the song's "haunting synth riff", "effective mid-way key change" and "gradual thickening of sound", and added that Lennox "rides with melody". The Newcastle Evening Chronicle praised it as a "startingly subdued yet instantly memorable single". Ralph Traitor of Sounds felt that it provided a "subtle contrast to the 60s-derived pop" that Lennow and Stewart performed in their previous band, the Tourists. He gave a mixed review of the song and questioned its commercial potential, writing, "It emotes a fragile and fatalistic mood but lacks the teeth to add discipline to fortify its watery impact in those crucial fledgling radio plays." He felt the "positively Gothic" B-side, "Le Sinistre", was "more interesting" than the A-side. Paul Tickell of NME believed the duo had "obviously been on a de-pomping machine since their hollow dramatic days with the Tourists" and continued, "Now they're merely boring and one-dimensional – and haunting, atmospheric, melodic, moderne etc etc with it." Simon Ludgate of Record Mirror remarked that Lennox and Stewart "plug on with their brand of particularly boring acid rock" and added that Lennox "seems to deny herself her real potential almost wilfully in order to fulfil an out-moded dream".

== Track listing ==
- A: "Never Gonna Cry Again" (LP Version) - 3:02
- B: "Le Sinistre" (Non-LP Track) – 2:47

== Personnel ==
=== Eurythmics ===
- Annie Lennox - keyboards, synthesizer, flute, vocals
- David A. Stewart - bass guitar, guitar

=== Guest musicians ===
- Holger Czukay (of Can) - French horn, walking
- Jaki Liebezeit (of Can) - drums

== Charts ==
Chart (1981)	Peak position
Netherlands (Tipparade)	16
UK Singles (Official Charts)	63
