= In the Garden (Eurythmics album) =

- Cover photography by Peter Ashworth

Studio album by Eurythmics
- Released: 16 October 1981
- Recorded: January–May 1981
- Studios: Conny's Studio, Wolperath, Cologne
- Genres: New wave; synth-pop; electropop; psychedelic pop; psychedelia; post-punk; electronic; experimental
- Length: 39:10
- Label: RCA
- Producers: Eurythmics; Conny Plank

Eurythmics chronology
In the Garden (1981)	Sweet Dreams (Are Made of This) (1983)

Singles from In the Garden
- 1. "Never Gonna Cry Again" Released: 5 June 1981; 2. "Belinda" Released: 21 August 1981

In the Garden is the debut studio album by the British new wave duo Eurythmics. It was released on 16 October 1981 by RCA Records.

The album was co-produced with krautrock producer Conny Plank at his studio in Cologne, and features numerous guest musicians including Blondie drummer Clem Burke, Deutsch Amerikanische Freundschaft drummer Robert Görl, and Can duo Holger Czukay and Jaki Liebezeit. Plank had previously worked with the duo whilst they were in their previous band the Tourists.

Two singles were released from the album in the UK, "Never Gonna Cry Again" and "Belinda". Neither the album nor the singles achieved much commercial success, although "Never Gonna Cry Again" charted at number 63 in the UK singles chart.

On 14 November 2005, RCA repackaged and released Eurythmics' back catalogue as "2005 Deluxe Edition Reissues". The re-issue of In the Garden added the B-sides from the album's two singles, plus three tracks recorded live on the accompanying tour.

== Background ==
Stewart first met Lennox in 1977 at the health food restaurant Pippins, where she was a waitress. During that time, Lennox was studying at Royal Academy of Music and Stewart was performing in the band Longdancer with Peet Coombes. The two became romantically involved after Stewart heard Lennox play some of her compositions on a harmonium. They later formed the Tourists with Coombes, who acted as the band's primary songwriter and lead vocalist. Lennox sang harmony vocals in The Tourists and played a Vox keyboard that once belonged to John Lennon while Stewart served as the band's guitarist. However, the band collapsed in part due to Coombes' drug dependency. Stewart ended their romantic relationship around the time the Tourists dissolved, although the two still remained on amicable terms and formed Eurythmics in 1980.

The formation of Eurythmics occurred during a New Year's Eve Party hosted by Conny Plank at his recording studio in Germany. At the party, Stewart and Lennox encountered Robert Görl, who was the drummer of Deutsch Amerikanische Freundschaft. The three held a jam session at Plank's studio that night and listened to music with Jaki Liebezeit and Holger Czukay. They recorded a series of demos at the insistence of Plank, who subsequently secured a record deal for the band with RCA Records. Plank served as the producer for In the Garden and received one third of the royalties generated from the album.

Stewart encouraged Lennox to ask Clem Burke of Blondie to contribute additional drums on the album. Lennox first encountered Burke playing Blondie's Autoamerican at a New York club and successfully convinced him to accompany them to Germany for the recording sessions.

Lennox reflected in an interview with The Observer that the album title was a metaphor for "a place of change. It mixes growth and death with optimism and pessimism."

== Recording ==
During the development of In the Garden, which was done in a farmhouse outside of Cologne, Plank travelled between recording studios to work with Ultravox. Stewart characterized the band's experience in Germany as something that "left a really big impression on us" Plank and several session members encouraged Stewart to incorporate a variety of sonic textures into their songs. Stewart first developed an interest in field recordings as a child and had experimented with recording sounds from a bakery adjacent to his house.

On In the Garden, Conny Plank and Holger Czukay from Can and Jaki [Liebezeit] would teach me to just record all different kind of sounds and mix them into the actual track—and even if you can't identify them, the whole track comes alive. I've always done that ever since, and it all goes back to being a kid and making a recording in the baking shop.

Stewart's interest in found sounds manifested in the atmospheric playground noises in "English Summer" and what Nick DeRiso of Ultimate Classic Rock describe as "weirdly disembodied voices" in "All the Young People". Furthermore, "She's Invisible Now" features a typewriter as musical counterpoint and "Revenge" is layered with the sound of a woman's satisfied laughs.

In an effort to distance himself from the music of the Tourists, Stewart sold two of his guitars and replaced them with a Roland TR-606 drum machine, a Roland Space Echo, and a synthesiser. Stewart explained that this decision was partially in response to a perceived pivot away from guitar-oriented albums in England. "The punk movement had happened and had annihilated anything to do with guitar records. If you were in England, it was a joke if you just made a normal guitar record." Lennox commented that the experimental nature of the album was a byproduct of their desire to forge a new musical identity distinct from the Tourists.

Plank encouraged the band to experiment with microphone placement during the recording process; this resulted in microphones being suspended up in a barn and dangling over a well in certain instances. Stewart later credited Plank with sharing techniques that prepared him to become a record producer.

Lennox was subsequently critical of the vocal techniques she employed on the album. She told the NME in 1982, "[They] were like a woman singing to herself as she did the washing-up. My voice was denying itself. It was an experiment to sing in that unaffected way, but it was like I was just using one colour from the whole paintbox of choices."

== Release ==
In the Garden was released on 16 October 1981, and was a commercial failure, failing to chart, and receiving little promotion from RCA Records. DeRiso writes: "Maybe it was a bit too weird. Record buyers stayed away in droves, as In the Garden failed to chart anywhere. RCA tried floating a pair of singles, but 'Never Gonna Cry Again' stalled at No. 63. 'Belinda' sank without a trace. It wasn't exactly an auspicious beginning for Eurythmics, but Lennox and Stewart were battle hardened after having already overcome so much." In The Rough Guide to Rock (1999), Justin Lewis comments on how the album's "European electronic sound" was a departure from the power pop with which the Tourists were associated but which was now unfashionable; as a result, "the critics didn't know quite what to make of their new sound. It didn't quite fit with New Romanticism – the new fad."

For the album's accompanying tour, the band decided to forgo amplifiers and instead connected their equipment into a mixing console situated onstage adjacent to the drummer. The sound was projected through a PA system; some studio monitors were also used for sound reference. Stewart compared the setup to a "giant HI-FI turned up" and noted that the audio quality was a source of confusion for certain audience members, who incorrectly believed that the band was miming their parts due to the lack of unwanted noise emanating from the speakers. Rehearsals took place at the Mix, a makeshift studio located in an attic above a Camden timber factory. The location housed three keyboards, a double-neck guitar, a mixing console and two tape recorders.

== Reception ==
Professional ratings
Review scores
Source	Rating
AllMusic	3/5 stars
Encyclopedia of Popular Music	2/5 stars
The Great Rock Discography	5/10
The Rolling Stone Album Guide	2.5/5 stars
The New Rolling Stone Album Guide	3/5 stars
Smash Hits	7½/10
Spin Alternative Record Guide	4/10

In a favourable review in Smash Hits magazine, Tim de Lisle commented "The ex-Tourists pack their bags and leave the safe pastures of pure English pop for the electronic delights of Cologne and superstar producer Connie Plank. On the way, they mug up on their Ultravox, Bowie, and Joy Division without forgetting their own roots, and the result is an intelligent, accessible first album." Paul Du Noyer of the NME noted Lennox's "mellow and understated" vocals, the "delicately hypnotic" arrangements, and the songwriting that "goes for a sophistication that doesn't try too hard" and is "soothingly evocative of moods and atmospheres". He felt the result made for an "often intriguing combination" and added that album, while the album is not "entirely free of the trite and repetitive", the "lapses are limited and there's enough of quality to suggest that these two Tourists, at least, have finally come home".

William Ruhlmann of AllMusic thought that Lennox's "ethereal" vocals were more subdued on In the Garden compared to the band's subsequent releases. He further described the album's production as having a "distant, mechanistic feel of the European electronic music movement, but less of the pop sensibility of later Eurythmics." Steven Grant and Ira Robbins of Trouser Press noted how Lennox and Stewart formed Eurythmics to translate their love of "Germanic experimental/electronic music" into a British context, deeming the "alluring" album to be "filled with lyrical love songs ('Belinda') and gently strident social anthems, like 'All the Young (People of Today)' and 'Your Time Will Come.' Empowering it all are Lennox’s captivating, flexible but strong vocals and a commitment and humor that turn potentially pretentious material into unaffected, poetic work."

Barry Walters of Spin Alternative Record Guide (1995) writes that In the Garden "updates British guitar-based psychedelia with German electronics" with members of Can, Blondie and industrial dance pioneers Deutsch Amerikanische Freundschaft, "names that say everything you need to know about the duo's early ambitions. Vague, muddled, breathy, and not very good, it does sound strikingly contemporary today." Also noting the contributions from members of Can, Martin C. Strong of The Great Rock Discography (2006) called In the Garden a "radical musical departure" from the Tourists, adding: "Icy synth-pop with avant-garde tendencies, the band's closest musical compadres were the lipstick 'n' legwarmers 'New Romantic' crowd, although Eurythmics' vision was unique. So unique, in fact, that the record languished in relative obscurity, given scant support by R.C.A." In The Encyclopedia of Popular Music (1997), Colin Larkin named it "a rigidly electronic sounding album, very Germanic, haunting and cold."

In 2021, Classic Pop ranked In the Garden at number 40 in their list of the top 40 debut albums of the 1980s, deeming it a "fascinating outlier" in Eurythmics' discography, one which is often overlooked in favour of the straightforward pop records Sweet Dreams (Are Made of This) and Touch (both 1983). The magazine write that Conny Plank's experimentalism "coaxes gutsy post-punk material from the duo; Stewart’s heavy guitar on 'Belinda' recalls the razorcut riffing of Keith Levene's work on PiL's 'Public Image' single. And the icy synths of 'Take Me To Your Heart' are the first signpost to their eventual electronic direction." Simon Reynolds writes that, after "briefly flirting with the experimental vanguard" on In the Garden, Eurythmics subsequently moved in a New Pop direction.

== Track listing ==
All tracks are written by Annie Lennox and David A. Stewart, except "English Summer" and "Caveman Head" co-written by Roger Pomphrey.

No.	Title	Length
1.	"English Summer"	4:02
2.	"Belinda"	3:58
3.	"Take Me to Your Heart"	3:35
4.	"She's Invisible Now"	3:30
5.	"Your Time Will Come"	4:34
6.	"Caveman Head"	3:59
7.	"Never Gonna Cry Again"	3:05
8.	"All the Young (People of Today)"	4:14
9.	"Sing-Sing"	4:05
10.	"Revenge"	4:31

2005 Special edition bonus tracks
No.	Title	Length
11.	"Le Sinestre"	2:44
12.	"Heartbeat Heartbeat"	2:02
13.	"Never Gonna Cry Again" (Live)	4:36
14.	"4/4 in Leather" (Live)	3:05
15.	"Take Me to Your Heart" (Live)	4:57

== Personnel ==
Eurythmics

- Annie Lennox – keyboards, synthesizer, flute, percussion, vocals
- David A. Stewart – keyboards, synthesizer, bass guitar, guitar, backing vocals

Guest musicians

- Clem Burke (of Blondie) – drums
- Holger Czukay (of Can) – French horn (2, 7), brass (5), Thai stringed instrument, walking
- Crista Fast (wife of Conny Plank) – backing vocals (10), laughs
- Robert Görl (of D.A.F.) – drums (2)
- Jaki Liebezeit (of Can) – drums (3, 7–8); brass (5)
- Roger Pomphrey – guitar and backing vocals (1, 5–6, 9), shouts
- Markus Stockhausen (son of Karlheinz Stockhausen) – brass (5)
- Tim Wheater – saxophone (7)

Technical

- Dave Hutchins – engineering
- Rocking Russian – design
- Peter Ashworth – sleeve photography
