= The Walk (Eurythmics song) =

Single by Eurythmics

from the album Sweet Dreams (Are Made of This)
- B-side: "Step on the Beast"; "The Walk" part 2; "Invisible Hands"; "Dr. Trash"
- Released: 18 June 1982
- Recorded: 1981
- Genre: New wave, synthpop
- Length: 3:38 (single version); 4:40 (album version)
- Label: RCA Records
- Songwriters: Annie Lennox, David A. Stewart
- Producers: David A. Stewart, Adam Williams

Eurythmics singles chronology
| "This Is the House" (1982) | "The Walk" (1982) | "Love Is a Stranger" (1982) |

Audio video
- "The Walk" on YouTube

"The Walk" is a 1982 song by the British new wave duo Eurythmics. It was the band's fourth single, and was included on their second album Sweet Dreams (Are Made of This) (1983).

== Background ==
Produced by band member David A. Stewart and Adam Williams (ex-bassist of The Selecter), the track was recorded at Eurythmics' own 8-track home studio. As with their previous three singles, it was commercially unsuccessful, though it was included on the band's platinum-selling second album Sweet Dreams (Are Made Of This) in 1983.

Several variations of the track have been released. The original 7" single featured "The Walk" (single version) and "The Walk" (part 2), whereas the 12" version included what would become the album version of the track. A fourth version, entitled "Let's Just Close Our Eyes", was released on the 12" of the band's next single "Love Is a Stranger".

== Music video ==
For many years, most fans were unaware that a music video had been produced for The Walk until it was released online in the early 2000s. The video, directed by Marek Budzynski, largely consists of shots of Annie Lennox (wearing a long black wig) performing to camera whilst Dave Stewart sits in the corner of a darkened room reading a newspaper. The video was produced by Julian Cole and edited by Sophie Muller, later to become a successful music video director herself. All were, at the time, first year students at the London College of Art where they met Dave and Annie via a mutual friend. The total budget for the video was £1000. The original negative and print copy quickly went missing after the single failed to achieve chart success whilst the BBC did not retain a telecine copy. The only surviving print was kept by Marek Budzynski himself, later remastered by a YouTube channel called Sterovideosubscriber and re-released online in 2017.

The website Eurythmics Video Visionaries interviewed Marek Budzynski in 2007 who revealed that the video was shot "at a carpenter friend of Dave and Annie's who had a courtyard outside" and that the duo and their manager were largely responsible for the concept of the video.

== B-sides ==
The 7" and 12" releases of the single contain several B-side tracks, none of which have been released elsewhere. They were omitted from Sony BMG's remastering of Eurythmics' back catalogue in 2005 and remain unavailable on CD. "Invisible Hands" had been the working title for what became the group's Sweet Dreams (Are Made of This) album, but in the end the track was dropped from the album altogether. "Dr. Trash" was written solely by Adam Williams, thus becoming one of the few Eurythmics' recordings not to be written by Annie Lennox and Dave Stewart.

== Critical reception ==
Upon its release, Robbi Millar of Sounds noted the "subtle Sixties atmosphere", "lashings of bright, brassy horns" and Lennox's "arresting voice". She concluded, "The result is powerful and proud." Simon Mares of the Reading Evening Post commented, "Eurythmics are on the right path with 'The Walk', which has an intriguing combination of horns and synthesisers, but despite Annie Lennox's vocals, they are not quite there yet."

== Track listings ==
=== 7" vinyl ===
UK: RCA 230
Side one

1. "The Walk" [Single version] (Note: The second chorus in this version is similar to the first, with heavy orchestration behind Lennox' vocals.) – 3:38

Side two

1. "Step on the Beast" – 3:42
2. "The Walk" (Part 2) (Note: The version on the 7" is strangely longer than the one found on the 12".) – 4:21

=== 12" vinyl ===
UK: RCAT 230
Side one

1. "The Walk" [Album version] (Note: The second chorus in this version is different from the first, with almost only the drums backing Lennox' vocals.) – 4:43

Side two

1. "Invisible Hands" – 6:08
2. "Dr. Trash" – 3:16
3. "The Walk" (Part 2) – 3:58

== Personnel ==
- Ann Lennox – vocals, piano, melodica
- David A. Stewart – synthesizers, guitar
- Dick Cuthell – horns, trumpet solo
- The Willing Participants – male choir
- Fritz from Flex – street talk, rap on "Step on the Beast"
