= Touch Dance =

Remix album by Eurythmics
- Released: 28 May 1984
- Genre: EDM
- Length: 47:33
- Label: RCA
- Producer: David A. Stewart

Eurythmics chronology
Touch (1983)	Touch Dance (1984)	1984 (For the Love of Big Brother) (1984)

Professional ratings
Review scores
Source	Rating
AllMusic	2/5 stars

Touch Dance is a remix album by the British pop duo Eurythmics, released in May 1984 by RCA Records. It contains seven dance remixes of four tracks from the duo's 1983 album Touch, with four remixes by John "Jellybean" Benitez and three by François Kevorkian and Jay Mark.

Eurythmics vocalist Annie Lennox has said in interviews that she disliked the record, as it was too much of a commercial product and was put together by RCA Records with little involvement from her and fellow bandmember David A. Stewart.

== Track listing ==
All tracks are written by Annie Lennox and David A. Stewart.

No.	Title	Length
1.	"The First Cut" (vocal remix)	6:34
2.	"Cool Blue" (vocal remix)	5:58
3.	"Paint a Rumour" (vocal remix)	7:26
4.	"Regrets" (vocal remix)	7:34
5.	"The First Cut" (instrumental remix)	7:14
6.	"Cool Blue" (instrumental remix)	6:54
7.	"Paint a Rumour" (instrumental remix)	5:53

== Personnel ==
Credits adapted from the liner notes of Touch Dance.

- Dean Garcia – bass
- Dick Cuthell – horns
- David A. Stewart – all other instruments, production
- Annie Lennox – all other instruments
- Jon Bavin – engineering
- François Kevorkian – mixing (tracks 1, 4, 5)
- Jay Mark – mixing (tracks 1, 4, 5)
- Linda Randazzo – engineering assistance (tracks 1, 4, 5)
- John "Jellybean" Benitez – mixing (tracks 2, 3, 6, 7)
- Michael Hutchinson – mix engineering (tracks 2, 3, 6, 7)
- Melanie West – engineering assistance (tracks 2, 3, 6, 7)
- Steve Rapport – photography

== Charts ==
Chart performance for Touch Dance
Chart (1984)	Peak position
UK Albums (Official Charts)	31
US Billboard 200	123
US Dance Club Songs (Billboard) All cuts	19
