= Touch (Eurythmics album) =

1983 studio album by Eurythmics

Studio album by Eurythmics
- Released: 14 November 1983
- Recorded: 1983
- Studio: The Church (London)
- Genres: Synth-pop; new wave
- Length: 45:30
- Label: RCA
- Producer: David A. Stewart

Eurythmics chronology
Sweet Dreams (Are Made of This) (1983)	Touch (1983)	Touch Dance (1984)

Singles from Touch
- 1. "Who's That Girl?" Released: 1 July 1983; 2. "Right by Your Side" Released: 28 October 1983; 3. "Here Comes the Rain Again" Released: 13 January 1984

Touch is the third studio album by British pop duo Eurythmics, released on 14 November 1983 by RCA Records. It became the duo's first number-one album on the UK Albums Chart, and also peaked at number seven on the US Billboard 200. It has since been certified Platinum in both the United Kingdom and the United States. The album spawned the singles "Who's That Girl?", "Right by Your Side" and "Here Comes the Rain Again", all of which reached the top 10 of the UK Singles Chart.

The album was listed 500th on Rolling Stone's "The 500 Greatest Albums of All Time" in 2003, and again on a revised list in 2012, at number 492.

== Background ==
By the time Touch was released, Eurythmics had achieved international success with their single "Sweet Dreams (Are Made of This)" and the album of the same name. Preceded by the single "Who's That Girl?", Touch was recorded and mixed in about three weeks at Eurythmics' own London studio facility, The Church.

An accompanying remix album, Touch Dance, was released in May 1984.

=== Cover ===
The cover image of Lennox was shot in 1983 by Peter Ashworth in Bagley's Warehouse above King's Cross Station. Originally, the shoot was for The Face magazine and the image was used for the cover of issue 42, before being chosen also as the cover of 'Touch'.

=== 2005 reissue ===
On 14 November 2005, Sony BMG repackaged and re-released Eurythmics' back catalogue as "2005 Deluxe Edition Reissues". Each of their eight studio albums' original track listings were supplemented with bonus tracks and remixes.

== Critical reception ==
Professional ratings
Review scores
Source	Rating
AllMusic	4.5/5 stars
Mojo	4/5 stars
Record Collector	4/5 stars
Rolling Stone	4/5 stars
The Rolling Stone Album Guide	4/5 stars
Smash Hits	9/10
Sounds	4/5 stars
Spin Alternative Record Guide	8/10
Uncut	3/5 stars
The Village Voice	B

=== Accolades ===
In 2000, Touch was voted number 221 in Colin Larkin's All Time Top 1000 Albums. In 2012, Rolling Stone ranked Touch at number 492 on its list of "The 500 Greatest Albums of All Time", calling the album "divine synth pop". It had originally appeared at number 500 on the 2003 version of the list. Slant Magazine placed the album at number 47 on its list of "The 100 Best Albums of the 1980s".

== Track listing ==
All tracks are written by Annie Lennox and David A. Stewart, except where noted.

Side one
No.	Title	Length
1.	"Here Comes the Rain Again"	4:54
2.	"Regrets"	4:43
3.	"Right by Your Side"	4:05
4.	"Cool Blue"	4:48
5.	"Who's That Girl?"	4:46

Side two
No.	Title	Length
6.	"The First Cut"	4:44
7.	"Aqua"	4:36
8.	"No Fear, No Hate, No Pain (No Broken Hearts)"	5:24
9.	"Paint a Rumour"	7:30
Total length:		45:30

2005 remastered reissue bonus tracks
No.	Title	Writer(s)	Length
10.	"You Take Some Lentils and You Take Some Rice"		3:01
11.	"ABC (Freeform)"	Stewart; Timothy Wheater; Nadine Masseron	2:36
12.	"Plus Something Else"		5:20
13.	"Paint a Rumour" (long version)		7:57
14.	"Who's That Girl?" (live)		3:28
15.	"Here Comes the Rain Again" (live)		3:07
16.	"Fame"	Carlos Alomar; David Bowie; John Lennon	2:39
Total length:			73:38

== Personnel ==
Credits adapted from the liner notes of Touch.

=== Eurythmics ===
- Annie Lennox – lead vocals and backing vocals, synthesizers, flute and arrangements
- David A. Stewart – guitars, synthesizers, drum machines, sequencer, dulcimer, xylophone, arrangements and backing vocals

=== Additional musicians ===
- Dick Cuthell – trumpet, flugelhorn and cornet
- Dean Garcia – bass
- Michael Kamen – string arrangements and conducting
- British Philharmonic Orchestra – strings
- Martin Dobson – baritone saxophone (track 3)

=== Technical ===
- David A. Stewart – production
- Jon Bavin – engineering

=== Artwork ===
- Peter Ashworth – outer sleeve photography
- Brian Aris – inner sleeve photography
- Laurence Stevens – art direction, design

== Charts ==
=== Weekly charts ===
Weekly chart performance for Touch
Chart (1983–1984)	Peak position
Australian Albums (Kent Music Report)	4
Canada Top Albums/CDs (RPM)	3
Dutch Albums (Album Top 100)	9
German Albums (Offizielle Top 100)	9
Icelandic Albums (Tónlist)	5
Italian Albums (Musica e dischi)	23
Japanese Albums (Oricon)	71
New Zealand Albums (RMNZ)	1
Norwegian Albums (VG-lista)	8
Swedish Albums (Sverigetopplistan)	9
Swiss Albums (Schweizer Hitparade)	14
UK Albums (Official Charts)	1
US Billboard 200	7
US Top R&B/Hip-Hop Albums (Billboard)	35

=== Year-end charts ===
1983 year-end chart performance for Touch
Chart (1983)	Position
UK Albums (Gallup)	36

1984 year-end chart performance for Touch
Chart (1984)	Position
Australian Albums (Kent Music Report)	12
Canada Top Albums/CDs (RPM)	13
Dutch Albums (Album Top 100)	38
German Albums (Offizielle Top 100)	66
New Zealand Albums (RMNZ)	17
UK Albums (Gallup)	26
US Billboard 200	27

== Certifications ==
Certifications for Touch
Region	Certification	Certified units/sales
Canada (Music Canada)	2× Platinum	200,000^{^}
Germany (BVMI)	Gold	250,000^{^}
Netherlands (NVPI)	Gold	50,000^{^}
New Zealand (RMNZ)	Platinum	15,000^{^}
United Kingdom (BPI)	Platinum	300,000^{^}
United States (RIAA)	Platinum	1,000,000^{^}
^{^} Shipments figures based on certification alone.
