= Who's That Girl? (Eurythmics song) =

1983 single by Eurythmics

Single by Eurythmics

from the album Touch
- B-side: "You Take Some Lentils and You Take Some Rice"; "ABC (Freeform)"
- Released: 1 July 1983
- Recorded: 1983
- Studio: The Church (London)
- Genre: Synth-pop
- Length: 4:46 (album version); 3:45 (radio edit)
- Label: RCA
- Songwriters: Annie Lennox; David A. Stewart
- Producer: David A. Stewart

Eurythmics singles chronology
| "Love Is a Stranger" (reissue) (1983) | "Who's That Girl?" (1983) | "Right by Your Side" (1983) |

Music video
- "Who's That Girl?" on YouTube

"Who's That Girl?" is a song by British pop duo Eurythmics. It was written by band members Annie Lennox and David A. Stewart and produced by Stewart.

In the UK, it was released in July 1983, several months in advance of their third studio album Touch (1983), on which the track eventually appeared. In North America, "Who's That Girl?" was issued as the second single from Touch, and did not appear as a single until April 1984.

== Reception ==
Cash Box called it a "real standout cut," saying it "features the group’s trademark ethereal musical textures and Annie Lennox’s unique vocal stylings."

The song became Eurythmics' third top-10 entry on the UK Singles Chart, peaking at number three. In the United States, "Who's That Girl?" was released as the second single from the album (following the top-10 single "Here Comes the Rain Again"), and reached number 21 on the Billboard Hot 100.

== Music video ==
Lennox appearing as male and female in the music video for "Who's That Girl?"

The video for "Who's That Girl?" became a heavily played clip on MTV, and further showcased Lennox's gender-bending image. She appears as a nightclub singer performing the song (complete with 1960s-era blonde flip wig) and also as a male member of the audience akin to Elvis Presley (as seen on the cover of the single). At the end of the video, the female Lennox is shown kissing the male Lennox.

Stewart appears in the video, escorted by a number of different women played by a variety of guest stars including Cheryl Baker and Jay Aston of Bucks Fizz, Kiki Dee, Hazel O'Connor, Kate Garner of Haysi Fantayzee and all four members of Bananarama (including Stewart's future wife, Siobhan Fahey and future group member Jacquie O'Sullivan, who was a member of the band Shillelagh Sisters when the video was filmed, and who would replace Fahey in Bananarama in 1988). The gender-bending pop star Marilyn also makes an appearance in the video as another of Stewart's escorts. Despite the small role, Marilyn's appearance proved to be a high-profile move which helped to launch his own music career later the same year.

== Track listings ==
7"

- A: "Who's That Girl?" (Short Version) - 3:49
- B: "You Take Some Lentils And You Take Some Rice" (Non-LP Track) - 3:03

12"

- A: "Who's That Girl?" (Extended Version) - 6:58
- B1: "You Take Some Lentils And You Take Some Rice" (Non-LP Track) - 3:03
- B2: "ABC (Freeform)" (Non-LP Track) - 2:40

== Charts ==
=== Weekly charts ===
Weekly chart performance for "Who's That Girl?"
| Chart (1983–1984) | Peak position |
|---|---|
| Australia (Kent Music Report) | 20 |
| Belgium (Ultratop 50 Flanders) | 14 |
| Canada Top Singles (RPM) | 15 |
| Ireland (IRMA) | 5 |
| Israel (Kol Yisrael) | 4 |
| Netherlands (Dutch Top 40) | 28 |
| Netherlands (Single Top 100) | 30 |
| New Zealand (Recorded Music NZ) | 13 |
| Sweden (Sverigetopplistan) | 14 |
| UK Singles (Official Charts) | 3 |
| US Billboard Hot 100 | 21 |
| US Cash Box Top 100 Singles | 21 |
| West Germany (GfK) | 19 |

=== Year-end charts ===
Year-end chart performance for "Who's That Girl?"
| Chart (1984) | Position |
|---|---|
| Canada Top Singles (RPM) | 90 |

== Cover versions ==
- The Flying Pickets recorded an a cappella version of the song. It was included on their 1988 compilation Best of The Flying Pickets.
- Australian chamber pop group Naked Raven included a cover of the song on their 2004 album Holding Our Breath.
