= The Tourists =

1970s British rock band

- The Tourists, 1980—L-R: Jim Toomey, Eddie Chin, Annie Lennox, Peet Coombes, and Dave Stewart

Background information
- Origin: London, England
- Genres: New wave; power pop
- Years active: 1976–1980
- Labels: Logo; RCA; Epic (US/Canada)
- Spinoffs: Eurythmics
- Past members: Dave Stewart; Peet Coombes; Annie Lennox; Eddie Chin; Jim Toomey

The Tourists were a British rock and pop band. They achieved brief success in the late 1970s before the band split in 1980. Two of its members, singer Annie Lennox and guitarist Dave Stewart, went on to international success as Eurythmics.

== Early history ==
Guitarists Peet Coombes and Dave Stewart were members of the folk rock band Longdancer, which was on Elton John's Rocket Records label. They moved to London, where they met Scottish singer Annie Lennox, who had dropped out of a course at the Royal Academy of Music to pursue her ambitions in pop music.

Forming a band in 1976, the three of them initially called themselves The Catch. In 1977, the band released a single named "Borderline/Black Blood" on Logo Records. It was released in the UK, the Netherlands, Spain, and Portugal, but was not a commercial success.

== The Tourists ==
By 1976, they had recruited bass guitarist Eddie Chin and drummer Jim Toomey (without exception, billed throughout his time with the Tourists as Jim "Do It" Toomey), and renamed themselves The Tourists. This was the beginning of a productive period for the band and they released three albums: The Tourists (1979), Reality Effect (1979), and Luminous Basement (1980), as well as half a dozen singles, including "Blind Among the Flowers" (1979), "The Loneliest Man in the World" (1979), "Don't Say I Told You So" (1980), and two hits, the Dusty Springfield cover "I Only Want to Be with You" (1979) and "So Good to Be Back Home Again" (1980), both of which reached the top 10 in the UK.

"I Only Want to Be with You" was also a top-10 hit in Australia and reached number 83 on the US Billboard Hot 100. Coombes was the band's main songwriter, although later releases had the first compositions by Lennox and Stewart.

In 1980, the band signed to the UK branch of RCA Records. They toured extensively in the UK and abroad, including as support for Roxy Music on their 1979 Manifesto Tour. The group disbanded in late 1980.

== After the break-up ==
Coombes and Chin began a new project named Acid Drops but this met with little success, and Coombes, despite originally being the main artistic force behind The Tourists, drifted out of the music business after the disbanding. Lennox and Stewart soon split as a couple, but decided to continue working as an experimental musical partnership, under the name Eurythmics. They retained their RCA recording contract and links with Conny Plank, who produced their first album In the Garden in 1981.

Coombes' death in March 1997 acted as a catalyst for Lennox and Stewart to revive their friendship and musical partnership, after they had previously disbanded Eurythmics in 1990.

Drummer Jim Toomey (no longer using his "Do It" nickname) published the book We Were Tourists in 2018, describing the band's career.

Bassist Eddie Chin died in 2023.

== Members ==
- Peet Coombes – vocals, guitar
- David A. Stewart – guitar, backing vocals
- Annie Lennox – vocals, keyboards
- Eddie Chin – bass guitar
- Jim "Do It" Toomey – drums

== Discography ==
=== Albums ===
Year	Title	UK	AUS	SWE	Certifications
1979	The Tourists	72	—	—	
1979	Reality Effect	23	62	45	
1980	Luminous Basement	75	—	—	
1984	Should Have Been Greatest Hits	—	—	—	
1997	Greatest Hits	—	—	—	
"—" denotes a recording that did not chart or was not released in that territory.

=== Singles ===
Year	Title	UK	AUS	CAN	IRE	USA	Certifications	Album
1979	"Blind Among the Flowers"	52	—	—	—	—		The Tourists
1979	"The Loneliest Man in the World"	32	—	—	—	—		The Tourists
1979	"I Only Want to Be with You"	4	6	50	13	83	UK: Gold	Reality Effect
1980	"So Good to Be Back Home Again"	8	—	—	9	—		Reality Effect
1980	"Don't Say I Told You So"	40	—	—	—	—		Luminous Basement
1980	"From the Middle Room"	—	—	—	—	—		Promo single
"—" denotes a recording that did not chart or was not released in that territory.
