= Basso & Brooke =

British fashion label

- Industry: Fashion
- Founded: 2001
- Founder: Bruno Basso, Christopher Brooke

Basso & Brooke is a fashion label formed by Bruno Basso and Christopher Brooke.

Bruno Basso was born in Santos, São Paulo, Brazil. Christopher Brooke was born in Newark-on-Trent, UK.

After meeting in 2001, they produced their first collection in 2004, and were the inaugural winners of Fashion Fringe, a UK talent competition to search out for the next big thing in fashion. The label is noted for their pioneering use of the digital print technique within the fashion industry. Tim Blanks of Style.com described them as the Pixar of clothes. They have also been described as "the masters of fantastical digital print."

Since then, they have launched numerous ready-to-wear collections from 2005–present.

In 2006, The Costume Institute of the Metropolitan museum of art in New York acquired the Swarovski crystal-covered finale piece of their Autumn/Winter 2005 collection.

In May 2009, Michelle Obama wore a piece from their SS09 collection at an informal evening of Poetry, Music and the Spoken Word within the White House.

== Collaborations ==
In April 2006, they produced a chandelier with Swarovski for the Crystal Palace exhibition in Milan, Italy.

In May 2009, Basso & Brooke collaborated with Converse for the Project (RED) charity, and designed a limited edition lipstick packaging for L'Oréal.

In 2006, The Dorchester Collection (a luxury hotel operator owned by the Brunei Investment Agency) commissioned Basso & Brooke to design a series of dresses to represent five of their hotels; Dorchester Hotel, The Beverly Hills Hotel, Plaza Athénée, Hotel Meurice and Principe di Savoia. Stephen Jones (milliner) to the Dior fashion house was enlisted by the designers to create hats to accompany the dresses.
