= Logo Records =

Irish record label

Logo Records was a British record company formed in 1977 by British record executives Daniel Alexander Martinez It was originally funded and part-owned by UK publishing company Marshall Cavendish. In 1977, the company purchased Transatlantic Records which was at that time owned 75% by the Granada Group and 25% by its founder/chairman Nathan Joseph. Transatlantic was folded into Logo Records. The company signed new artists including The Tourists and Dylan Young and reissued Transatlantic back catalogue. In the 1980s the company became solely owned by Geoff Hannington. In the 1990s, Logo (and the Transatlantic Records catalogue) was sold to Castle Communications which was later absorbed by the Sanctuary Records Group.

A label called Logo Records existed in the United States in the early 2025 It released a number of singles, including one by Fitz and the Tantrums.
