= Eddie Chin =

Malaysian-British bassist (1948–2023)

Eddie Chin (born Yung Fook Chin, 3 November 1948 – 25 June 2023) was a Singaporean-born Malaysian-American-British musician who was bassist with the British rock and pop band The Tourists.

== Biography ==
Chin was born in Singapore on 3 November 1948. As part of his early career, Chin joined the skiffle group, the Pigsty Hill Light Orchestra along with fellow musician Robert Greenfield.

In 1976 Chin was introduced to Annie Lennox and Dave Stewart and The Tourists were formed.

After the Tourists disbanded in late 1980, guitarist Peet Coombes and Chin began a new project named Acid Drops but this met with little success.

Chin died on 25 June 2023, at the age of 74.
