= Peet Coombes =

English musician (1953–1997)

- Born: Peter George Coombes; 16 July 1953; Bradford, Yorkshire, England
- Died: 30 March 1997 (aged 43) Truro, Cornwall, England
- Genres: New wave; post-punk
- Occupations: Musician; songwriter
- Instruments: Vocals; guitar
- Formerly of: The Tourists; The Catch

Peter George "Peet" Coombes (16 July 1953 – 30 March 1997) was an English guitarist, vocalist, and songwriter. He was the lead singer and primary songwriter of the group The Tourists, the first charting band to feature guitarist Dave Stewart and singer Annie Lennox, who later gained greater fame as the duo Eurythmics.

== The Catch and The Tourists ==
Coombes was born in Bradford, England, but spent most of his early life in Sunderland, where he met Dave Stewart. Stewart introduced Coombes to Annie Lennox, whom he had met when she was working in a London restaurant. In 1976 the three formed a post-disco band called The Catch, which released one single "Borderline/Black Blood" that failed to chart. The band renamed itself The Tourists, adding bassist Eddie Chin and drummer Jim Toomey. Coombes played guitar, sang, and wrote most of The Tourists' original songs. After releasing their third album in 1980, the band dissolved, with Coombes started to resent being asked to write 'lightweight pop songs'.

== Post-Tourists ==
Peet Coombes and Eddie Chin started a group called Acid Drops who started writing psychedelic pop in an early 1980s style, but did not perform any gigs or release recorded material. Coombes moved to London and did not perform during most of the 1980s. In 1992, he moved to Cornwall and created the band Diminished Responsibility, with amateur producer and bassist Andy Brown, his wife Cathy, and Dave Farghally on drums. The band did not release any recordings.

In the 1990s, his health deteriorated, and by late 1996, he could no longer perform. He died in 1997 aged 43 due to cirrhosis related to long-term heavy consumption of alcohol.

Coombes' sons Joey and Robin Coombes formed the hip-hop group Task Force.
