= Ultimate Collection (Eurythmics album) =

Greatest hits album by Eurythmics
- Released: 7 November 2005
- Recorded: 1982–2000
- Genres: New wave; synth-pop; pop rock
- Length: 79:42
- Label: RCA
- Producers: David A. Stewart; Adam Williams; Eurythmics

Eurythmics chronology
| Peace (1999) | Ultimate Collection (2005) | Boxed (2005) |

Singles from Ultimate Collection
- 1. "I've Got a Life" Released: 31 October 2005

Professional ratings
Review scores
| Source | Rating |
|---|---|
| AllMusic | 4.5/5 stars |

Ultimate Collection is the second greatest hits album by British pop duo Eurythmics, released on 7 November 2005 by RCA Records. It marked a return for the duo to the recording studio to write and record the only single to be released from the album, "I've Got a Life", which became a commercial success, topping the US Dance Club Songs, reaching the top ten in Scotland and the top twenty in the United Kingdom.

== Background and release ==
The release of the album was preceded by one week the reissue of all eight Eurythmics back-catalogue albums originally released by RCA Records. These reissues include remastered tracks and bonus material. The fact that the Ultimate Collection was closely connected to these reissues is also the chief reason for the omission of "Sexcrime (Nineteen Eighty-Four)". While that song peaked at number four in the United Kingdom in 1984 and was later featured on the previous Greatest Hits album released in 1991, it is actually taken from the 1984 Virgin Records soundtrack album 1984 (For the Love of Big Brother), Eurythmics' only album to date not to be released by RCA Records in the UK.

Unlike 1991's Greatest Hits, Ultimate Collection contains two previous unreleased songs, "I've Got a Life" and "Was It Just Another Love Affair?", both recorded during the Peace album sessions, and all of the tracks have been remastered. It also contains no tracks from the duo's albums In the Garden (1981) and, unlike Greatest Hits, We Too Are One (1989). One of the new songs, "I've Got a Life", was released as a single. It entered the UK Singles Chart at number 14 and spent three weeks at number one on the Hot Dance Club Play chart in the United States.

Ultimate Collection peaked at number five on the UK Albums Chart and has since been certified triple platinum by the British Phonographic Industry (BPI).

== Track listing ==
All tracks are written by Annie Lennox and David A. Stewart, except "When Tomorrow Comes" co-written by Patrick Seymour.

| No. | Title | Original appearance | Length |
|---|---|---|---|
| 1. | "I've Got a Life" | previously unreleased | 4:05 |
| 2. | "Love Is a Stranger" | Sweet Dreams (Are Made of This) (1983) | 3:42 |
| 3. | "Sweet Dreams (Are Made of This)" | Sweet Dreams (Are Made of This) | 3:36 |
| 4. | "Who's That Girl?" (single edit) | Touch (1983) | 3:44 |
| 5. | "Right by Your Side" (single edit) | Touch | 3:49 |
| 6. | "Here Comes the Rain Again" | Touch | 4:51 |
| 7. | "Would I Lie to You?" | Be Yourself Tonight (1985) | 4:26 |
| 8. | "There Must Be an Angel (Playing with My Heart)" (single edit) | Be Yourself Tonight | 4:41 |
| 9. | "Sisters Are Doin' It for Themselves" (with Aretha Franklin; single edit) | Be Yourself Tonight and Who's Zoomin' Who? (1985) | 4:53 |
| 10. | "It's Alright (Baby's Coming Back)" | Be Yourself Tonight | 3:47 |
| 11. | "When Tomorrow Comes" (single edit) | Revenge (1986) | 4:15 |
| 12. | "Thorn in My Side" | Revenge | 4:13 |
| 13. | "The Miracle of Love" (single edit) | Revenge | 4:35 |
| 14. | "Missionary Man" (single edit) | Revenge | 3:47 |
| 15. | "You Have Placed a Chill in My Heart" | Savage (1987) | 3:52 |
| 16. | "I Need a Man" | Savage | 4:23 |
| 17. | "I Saved the World Today" (single edit) | Peace (1999) | 4:26 |
| 18. | "17 Again" (single edit) | Peace | 4:20 |
| 19. | "Was It Just Another Love Affair?" | previously unreleased | 3:50 |
| Total length: | | | 79:42 |

iTunes Store bonus track
| No. | Title | Original appearance | Length |
|---|---|---|---|
| 20. | "The King and Queen of America" | We Too Are One (1989) | 4:21 |
| Total length: | | | 84:03 |

DVD
| No. | Title | Length |
|---|---|---|
| 1. | "I've Got a Life" (music video) |
| 2. | "Love Is a Stranger" (music video) |
| 3. | "Sweet Dreams (Are Made of This)" (music video) |
| 4. | "Who's That Girl" (music video) |
| 5. | "Right by Your Side" (music video) |
| 6. | "Here Comes the Rain Again" (music video) |
| 7. | "Would I Lie to You?" (music video) |
| 8. | "There Must Be an Angel (Playing with My Heart)" (music video) |
| 9. | "Sisters Are Doin' It for Themselves" (music video) |
| 10. | "It's Alright (Baby's Coming Back)" (music video) |
| 11. | "When Tomorrow Comes" (music video) |
| 12. | "Thorn in My Side" (music video) |
| 13. | "The Miracle of Love" (music video) |
| 14. | "Missionary Man" (music video) |
| 15. | "You Have Placed a Chill in My Heart" (music video) |
| 16. | "I Need a Man" (music video) |
| 17. | "I Saved the World Today" (music video) |

== Personnel ==
Credits adapted from the liner notes of Ultimate Collection.

- David A. Stewart – production (tracks 1–16, 19)
- Adam Williams – production (track 2)
- Eurythmics – production (tracks 17, 18)
- Stevie Wonder – harmonica (track 8)
- Aretha Franklin – vocals (track 9)
- Lewis Ziolek – photography
- Peter Ashworth – photography
- Michael Segal – photography
- Laurence Stevens – art direction, graphic design
- Ian Cooper – mastering, remastering

== Charts ==
=== Weekly charts ===
Weekly chart performance for Ultimate Collection
| Chart (2005–2006) | Peak position |
|---|---|
| Australian Albums (ARIA) | 14 |
| Austrian Albums (Ö3 Austria) | 29 |
| Belgian Albums (Ultratop Flanders) | 12 |
| Belgian Albums (Ultratop Wallonia) | 42 |
| Danish Albums (Hitlisten) | 14 |
| Dutch Albums (Album Top 100) | 40 |
| European Albums (Billboard) | 14 |
| Finnish Albums (Suomen virallinen lista) | 40 |
| French Compilation Albums (SNEP) | 17 |
| German Albums (Offizielle Top 100) | 36 |
| Greek Albums (IFPI) | 47 |
| Irish Albums (IRMA) | 9 |
| Italian Albums (FIMI) | 9 |
| Japanese Albums (Oricon) | 152 |
| New Zealand Albums (RMNZ) | 6 |
| Norwegian Albums (VG-lista) | 40 |
| Scottish Albums (Official Charts) | 5 |
| Spanish Albums (Promusicae) | 68 |
| Swedish Albums (Sverigetopplistan) | 14 |
| Swiss Albums (Schweizer Hitparade) | 24 |
| UK Albums (Official Charts) | 5 |
| US Billboard 200 | 116 |

=== Year-end charts ===
2005 year-end chart performance for Ultimate Collection
| Chart (2005) | Position |
|---|---|
| UK Albums (OCC) | 36 |

2006 year-end chart performance for Ultimate Collection
| Chart (2006) | Position |
|---|---|
| UK Albums (OCC) | 169 |

2009 year-end chart performance for Ultimate Collection
| Chart (2009) | Position |
|---|---|
| UK Albums (OCC) | 188 |

== Certifications and sales ==
Certifications and sales for Ultimate Collection
| Region | Certification | Certified units/sales |
|---|---|---|
| Australia (ARIA) | 2× Platinum | 140,000^{‡} |
| Belgium (BRMA) | Gold | 25,000^{*} |
| Germany (BVMI) | Platinum | 200,000^{‡} |
| Ireland (IRMA) | 2× Platinum | 30,000^{^} |
| Italy sales in 2005 | — | 130,000 |
| Italy (FIMI) | Gold | 25,000^{*} |
| New Zealand (RMNZ) | Gold | 7,500^{^} |
| United Kingdom (BPI) | 3× Platinum | 900,000^{^} |
^{*} Sales figures based on certification alone.^{^} Shipments figures based on certification alone.^{‡} Sales+streaming figures based on certification alone.
