= Savage (video) =

Video by Eurythmics
- Released: June 1988
- Recorded: 1987–88
- Genre: Music Video Album
- Length: 52 mins
- Label: Virgin Music Video
- Director: Sophie Muller, except Track 4: Steve Graham & Eric Scott; Track 7: Chester Dent & John Stewart
- Producer: Billy Poveda, John Stewart; Oil Factory Ltd.

Eurythmics chronology
| Eurythmics Live (1987) | Savage (1988) | We Two Are One Too (1990) |

Savage is a video album by the British pop duo Eurythmics released in 1988 on VHS and LaserDisc. It is a companion video to their 1987 music album of the same name.

The Savage video album was nominated for Best Music Film at the 1989 Grammy Awards.

== Background ==
The decision to create a video album to accompany the record was based upon the fact that the band did not want to embark on another full-length tour that year (having completed the worldwide "Revenge Tour" some months earlier). Another factor influencing the project may have been the band Blondie (of whom Lennox was a huge fan), who made a similar video album for their 1979 LP Eat to the Beat, which also featured a combination of straight performance as well as more conceptual clips.

Dave Stewart's only prominent appearances on the video album are limited to three tracks (and some archive concert footage in a fourth) though these particular clips do not appear to be directly related to the recurring theme. The running order of the tracks on the video album differ from that of the original album, making for a more cohesive concept piece.

The video album was promoted at a launch party at The Novello Room in London on 4 July 1988, at which the duo performed several tracks live on stage. The event was featured in an edition of the UK's Channel 4 series Wired later that month.

== Concept ==
The majority of the video album was directed by Sophie Muller, and the individual video clips largely (but not exclusively) focus upon Annie Lennox interpreting the Madonna–whore complex in the form of a neurotic mousey housewife and an extroverted blonde vamp, and are steeped in metaphorical imagery and subtext. The only tracks not directed by Muller were "Shame" which was directed by Steve Graham (with animation directed by artist Eric Scott and animator Emma Calder), and "I've Got a Lover (Back in Japan)" which was directed by Chester Dent and John Stewart. Lennox would go on to make another thematic video album for her 1992 solo album Diva, again directed by Muller.

== Track listing ==
1. "Beethoven (I Love to Listen To)"

In this video, Lennox begins by portraying a conservatively-dressed, middle-class housewife alone in her apartment. She is seen obsessively performing her "domestic role" by cleaning, cooking, and knitting. Also seen in the apartment are a mischievous little girl wearing heavy make-up, a blonde wig and a Shirley Temple-style dress, and a tall, bald man - also wearing heavy make-up and a low-cut evening gown. Neither the little girl or the man are actually noticed by the housewife even though they appear in the same room as her, suggesting that they are elements of her psyche rather than a real physical presence. Whilst the little girl proceeds to run riot and tear up the apartment that Lennox's prim housewife has so diligently tried to keep in order, the bald man stands quietly in the background. Unable to cope with this turmoil in her neat, orderly little world, the housewife finally breaks down and proceeds to undergo a transformation into an overtly sexual blonde vamp character. Now heavily made up in a low-cut gown, she has become a combination of the three personas of the little girl (blonde, wild and attention-seeking), the man (uninhibited sexuality and defying conventional gender roles), and the housewife. Free of the constraints of her housewife persona, she then proceeds to trash the apartment herself and brazenly sashays out onto the street outside. Eurythmics' "Beethoven" video was ranked number 98 in a Rolling Stone magazine chart of the Top 100 Videos of All Time, published in the mid-1990s.

2. "I Need a Man"

A basic performance clip, Lennox (still in the blonde vamp persona) performs the song direct to the camera, by herself on a stage in an uninhibited, provocative manner. After finishing the song, and still in character, she stumbles down a corridor and collapses in a hotel room.

3. "Heaven"

In stark contrast to the housewife persona and her life of domestic drudgery, Lennox's vamp character is featured in a variety of "luxury" situations including eating sushi and drinking cocktails as she lounges in a hotel room, and being driven through the palm-tree lined streets of Los Angeles in a convertible (by Dave Stewart, partially visible in the rear-view mirror).

4. "Shame"

Both Stewart and Lennox sing to the camera in front of an animated background of ever-changing collaged and painted images, matching the lyrics they are singing. They both appear bare (from the shoulders up) with Stewart behind Lennox, appearing to physically support her. The video is unrelated to the previous Savage concept and was not directed by Sophie Muller.

5. "Wide-Eyed Girl"

Lennox, in the guise of a young 1960s woman, meets a man, gets pregnant, marries him, has a baby girl, then evolves into a dowdier version of the blonde vamp character who fights with the now rebellious grown-up daughter when she catches her bringing her boyfriend up to her bedroom. The daughter leaves for Italy, finds a man, and moves out, leaving her mother by herself. The girl's father is not seen at all in the second time-frame, perhaps accounting for why the mother character is so disapproving of her daughter bringing boyfriends home with her.

6. "Do You Want to Break Up?"

Another performance clip (albeit a heavily stylised one), with Lennox performing midway between the housewife character and the vamp character (conservatively dressed but with heavy make-up), singing on an Alps-based setting. The video suggests an Oktoberfest celebration as many dancers wear lederhosen and drink beer. The scenario is implied to be a bad dream that Lennox (as herself) is having, as we see her struggling in her sleep and later awakened, mesmerised by the experience.

7. "I've Got a Lover (Back in Japan)"

A series of shots of Lennox relaxing in the back of a limousine and staring out of a building window are interspersed with some live concert shots (featuring both Lennox and Stewart). This was the second of two videos on the album not directed by Sophie Muller.

8. "Put the Blame on Me"

A very simple, minimal video, showing processed headshots of Lennox overlapped with a swirling, psychedelic purple background. It also shows Lennox having heavy makeup applied to her face. (The kind worn by the blonde vamp persona)

9. "Savage"

This video shows simple, slow motion shots of Lennox posing for photographs whilst in her blonde vamp persona. The camera lingers on her in a slow and languid manner, much like the style of the song. This concept was replicated in Lennox's 1992 video for her song "Why", also directed by Sophie Muller.

10. "You Have Placed a Chill in My Heart"

This clip sees Lennox appear in both guises of the housewife and the vamp, as well as that of a ragged survivor, with darkened eyes who walks barefoot through a cold desert. The clip ends with her being transformed into a much softer, cleaner, and warmer looking Lennox, joyously embracing a man. The video was filmed in California at Death Valley National Park and Sherman Oaks.

11. "I Need You"

This video is a straight performance featuring Lennox and Stewart, who is playing an acoustic guitar (the song's only accompaniment). As they perform, seated, we hear chatter in the background and the viewer sees images of people walking past the duo and not appearing to be paying much attention to them.

12. "Brand New Day"

This is both the last song on the album and the video album. It features Lennox (as herself) in an immaculately tailored white suit on a stage with several young schoolgirls in theatrical costume, who perform "Eurhythmics" (a music education type of dance from which the band originally took their name) to the song. Afterwards, Lennox and the girls take a curtain bow to a fake cheering audience.

At the beginning of the video for "Wide-Eyed Girl", an untitled 1960s-style song is performed by Eurythmics and heard over a radio. The same song is heard over the end credits for the video album.

== Music credits ==
- All tracks written by Annie Lennox and David A. Stewart.
- All tracks produced by David A. Stewart.

== Charts ==
Chart performance for Savage
| Chart (1988) | Peak position |
|---|---|
| UK Top Music Videos (Music Week/Gallup) | 4 |
| US Top Music Videos (Billboard) | 13 |
