= We Two Are One Too =

Video by Eurythmics
- Released: April 1990
- Recorded: 1989–90
- Genre: Music Compilation Video
- Length: 60 mins
- Label: BMG Video
- Director: Sophie Muller
- Producer: Oil Factory Productions

Eurythmics chronology
Savage (1988)	We Two Are One Too (1990)	Greatest Hits (1991)

We Two Are One Too is a music compilation video by the British pop group Eurythmics released in April 1990 on VHS and LaserDisc (Europe and Japan).

It features the promo videos for the five singles taken from their platinum-selling 1989 album We Too Are One, interspersed with montages and footage (both on and off stage) from their 1989–1990 worldwide concert tour. Though not strictly a "video album" in the same vein as the one produced for Savage in 1988, all of the tracks from the We Too Are One album are included in the video in some form or other.

The video was directed by Sophie Muller, with the exception of the promos for "The King and Queen of America" (directed by Willy Smax) and "Revival" (directed by Philippe Gautier). This is the only commercially available release of the "Revival" video, which has not been included on any of the band's subsequent video compilations.

== Track listing ==
1. "We 4 Are 3" (intro montage) – 2:38
2. "We Two Are One" (live and acoustic versions) – 1:30
3. "I Love You Like a Ball and Chain" (live version) – 1:17
4. "Don't Ask Me Why" (promo) – 4:20
5. "How Long?" (improvisation with Dave Stewart singing and Annie Lennox on guitar) – 2:09
6. "You Hurt Me (And I Hate You)" (album version) – 0:30
7. "(My My) Baby's Gonna Cry" (promo) – 4:52
8. "We Two Are One" (live version) – 0:23
9. "I Need You" (improvisation) – 2:19
10. "Rudolph the Red-Nosed Reindeer" (improvisation with Dave Stewart and a group of schoolchildren) – 1:30
11. "The King and Queen of America" (promo) – 4:19
12. "Love Is a Stranger" (live version) – 0:25
13. "Sylvia" (album version) – 1:28
14. "Revival" (promo) – 3:59
15. "Farewell to Tawathie" (traditional Scottish folk song; improvisation) – 2:30
16. "Angel" (promo) – 5:05
17. "Ballad of Eurythmics Road Crew" (soundcheck improvisation with Dave Stewart singing and Annie Lennox on drums) – 1:23
18. "When the Day Goes Down" (album and live versions) – 6:21

== Music credits ==
All songs written by Annie Lennox and Dave Stewart, except:

- "You Hurt Me (And I Hate You)" written by Annie Lennox/Dave Stewart/Chucho Merchan
- "Revival" written by Annie Lennox/Dave Stewart/Charlie Wilson/Patrick Seymour
- "Rudolph the Red-Nosed Reindeer" by Marks
- "Ballad of Eurythmics Road Crew" by Dave Stewart
- "Farewell to Tawathie" (traditional)

Music produced by David A. Stewart and Jimmy Iovine.

== Charts ==
Chart performance for We Two Are One Too
Chart (1990)	Peak position
UK Top Music Videos (Music Week/Gallup)	5
US Top Music Videos (Billboard)	13
