= I've Got a Life =

2005 single by Eurythmics

Single by Eurythmics

from the album Ultimate Collection
- B-side: "Sweet Dreams (Are Made of This)" (Steve Angello remix)
- Released: 31 October 2005
- Genre: Disco-pop
- Length: 4:07
- Label: Arista, Sony BMG
- Songwriters: Annie Lennox, David A. Stewart
- Producer: David A. Stewart

Eurythmics singles chronology
"Peace Is Just a Word" (2000)	"I've Got a Life" (2005)

Music video
- "I've Got a Life" on YouTube

"I've Got a Life" is a song released by the British pop music duo Eurythmics. It was released as a single in 2005, in order to promote their second greatest hits compilation, Ultimate Collection. It was written by band members Annie Lennox and David A. Stewart and produced by Stewart. It was the duo's final single as of 2026, becoming their 14th UK top-20 hit, and it also topped the US Billboard Dance Club Play chart.

== Recording ==
The song was one of two newly recorded tracks included on Eurythmics' second greatest hits package Ultimate Collection, and the only one of the two released as a single (the other newly recorded track being the song "Was It Just Another Love Affair?"). The song is an electronic dance tune with uplifting lyrics of empowerment. Its music video featured Lennox and Stewart performing the song in front of many television screens showing scenes from videos spanning their Eurythmics career. Lennox also reprised her "Sweet Dreams (Are Made of This)" image by performing the song in a man's suit (her hair was not shaved and colored orange, however). The music video for the song is directed by Matthew Rolston.

== Chart performance ==
"I've Got a Life" returned Eurythmics to the top 40 of the UK Singles Chart, peaking at number 14. The song was released as a digital download in the United States, although dance remixes were issued on vinyl to nightclub DJs. The track spent three weeks at number one on the US Billboard Dance Club Play chart at the end of 2005 and reached number 31 on the Billboard Adult Contemporary chart.

== Track listings ==
UK CD 1

1. "I've Got a Life" – 4:08
2. "Sweet Dreams (Are Made of This)" (Steve Angello Remix) – 5:31

UK CD 2

1. "I've Got a Life" – 4:06
2. "I've Got a Life" (Sander Kleinenberg's You're It Mix) – 7:35
3. "Sweet Dreams (Are Made of This)" (Remastered) – 4:06
- Video "I've Got a Life"

== Personnel ==
- Written-by – Lennox, Stewart
- Producer – Stewart
- Engineer, Programmed By – Ned Douglas
- Mixed by – Scott Campbell
- Art Direction, Design [Graphic Design] – Laurence Stevens
- Photography by [Sleeve] – Michael Segal

== Charts ==
=== Weekly charts ===
Weekly chart performance for "I've Got a Life"
Chart (2005)	Peak position
Global Dance Songs (Billboard)	10
Ireland (IRMA)	38
Scotland Singles (OCC)	10
Switzerland (Schweizer Hitparade)	36
UK Singles (OCC)	14
US Adult Contemporary (Billboard)	31
US Dance Club Songs (Billboard)	1
US Dance/Mix Show Airplay (Billboard)	16

=== Year-end charts ===
Year-end chart performance for "I've Got a Life"
Chart (2006)	Position
US Dance Club Play (Billboard)	15

== See also ==
- List of Billboard Hot Dance Club Play number ones of 2005
