= I've Tried Everything =

I've Tried Everything may refer to:

- "I've Tried Everything", a 1999 song by Eurythmics from Peace
- "I've Tried Everything", a 2011 song by Olly Murs from In Case You Didn't Know
