= Savage (Eurythmics album) =

Studio album by Eurythmics
- Released: 9 November 1987
- Recorded: January–May 1987
- Studios: Chateau de Dangu (Normandy, France)
- Genres: Synth-pop; Eurodisco; electronica; avant-pop
- Length: 47:10
- Label: RCA
- Producer: David A. Stewart

Eurythmics chronology
Revenge (1986)	Savage (1987)	We Too Are One (1989)

Singles from Savage
- 1. "Beethoven (I Love to Listen To)" Released: 12 October 1987; 2. "Shame" Released: 7 December 1987; 3. "I Need a Man" Released: 28 March 1988; 4. "You Have Placed a Chill in My Heart" Released: 31 May 1988

Professional ratings
Review scores
Source	Rating
AllMusic	2/5 stars
Robert Christgau	B+
Los Angeles Times	3/4 stars
New Musical Express	7/10
Q	5/5 stars
Record Mirror	4.5/5 stars
Rolling Stone	3/5 stars
Smash Hits	7/10
Sounds	4.5/5 stars

Savage is the sixth studio album by British pop duo Eurythmics, released on 9 November 1987 by RCA Records. The album peaked at number seven on the UK Albums Chart and has been certified Platinum by the British Phonographic Industry (BPI) for shipments in excess of 300,000 copies.

The album spawned a total of four singles – "Beethoven (I Love to Listen To)", "Shame", "I Need a Man" and "You Have Placed a Chill in My Heart", all of which achieved considerable commercial success internationally.

== Background ==
Following the much more mainstream commercial content of their previous two albums, Savage saw Eurythmics return to a more experimental sound that their early albums incorporated. The album was recorded at Chateau de Dangu in Normandy and mixed at Grande Armée Studios in Paris. The only other musician working on the recordings with Stewart and Annie Lennox was drummer Olle Romo, who handled much of the Synclavier programming. Lennox brought more of a feminist focus to her lyrics which was made more evident by the accompanying video album, which featured a video for each song.

== Release and reception ==
Although Savage was not as commercially successful as the duo's previous four studio albums, it reached the top 10 in the United Kingdom, spawned three UK top-30 singles, and has been certified Platinum. It was less successful in the United States, where it peaked at number 41.

On 14 November 2005, Sony BMG repackaged and released most of Eurythmics' back catalogue (including Savage) as deluxe edition reissues. Each of their eight studio albums' original track listings were supplemented with bonus tracks and remixes.

== Track listing ==
All tracks are written by Annie Lennox and David A. Stewart, except "Come Together" by John Lennon and Paul McCartney.

No.	Title	Length
1.	"Beethoven (I Love to Listen To)"	4:48
2.	"I've Got a Lover (Back in Japan)"	4:25
3.	"Do You Want to Break Up?"	3:38
4.	"You Have Placed a Chill in My Heart"	3:50
5.	"Shame"	4:23
6.	"Savage"	4:10
7.	"I Need a Man"	4:21
8.	"Put the Blame on Me"	3:44
9.	"Heaven"	3:28
10.	"Wide Eyed Girl"	3:29
11.	"I Need You"	3:22
12.	"Brand New Day"	3:42
Total length:		47:10

2005 special edition bonus tracks
No.	Title	Length
13.	"Beethoven (I Love to Listen To)" (Extended Philharmonic Version)	4:31
14.	"Shame" (Dance Mix)	5:38
15.	"I Need a Man" (Macho Mix)	5:55
16.	"I Need You" (Live)	3:07
17.	"Come Together"	3:20
Total length:		69:41

== Personnel ==
Credits adapted from the liner notes of Savage.

=== Eurythmics ===
- Annie Lennox
- David A. Stewart

=== Additional musician ===
- Olle Romo – programming

=== Technical ===
- Fred DeFaye – recording engineering; mixing engineering (tracks 4, 5, 8, 9)
- Alan Moulder – lead vocal recording (track 6)
- Claude Pons – mixing engineering assistance (tracks 4, 5, 8, 9)
- Manu Guiot – additional recording (unspecified tracks); mixing engineering (tracks 1–3, 6, 7, 10–12)
- Serge Pauchard – mixing engineering assistance (tracks 1–3, 6, 7, 10–12)
- David A. Stewart – production

=== Artwork ===
- Alastair Thain – sleeve photography
- Laurence Stevens – sleeve design

== Charts ==
=== Weekly charts ===
Weekly chart performance for Savage
Chart (1987–1988)	Peak position
Australian Albums (Australian Music Report)	15
Austrian Albums (Ö3 Austria)	17
Canada Top Albums/CDs (RPM)	9
Dutch Albums (Album Top 100)	26
European Albums (Music & Media)	6
Finnish Albums (Suomen virallinen lista)	9
French Albums (IFOP)	26
German Albums (Offizielle Top 100)	23
Italian Albums (Musica e dischi)	11
Japanese Albums (Oricon)	89
New Zealand Albums (RMNZ)	7
Norwegian Albums (VG-lista)	10
Swedish Albums (Sverigetopplistan)	2
Swiss Albums (Schweizer Hitparade)	10
UK Albums (Official Charts)	7
US Billboard 200	41

=== Year-end charts ===
1987 year-end chart performance for Savage
Chart (1987)	Position
UK Albums (Gallup)	85

1988 year-end chart performance for Savage
Chart (1988)	Position
Australian Albums (Australian Music Report)	77
Canada Top Albums/CDs (RPM)	42

== Certifications ==
Certifications for Savage
Region	Certification	Certified units/sales
Australia (ARIA)	Gold	35,000^{^}
Canada (Music Canada)	Platinum	100,000^{^}
France (SNEP)	Gold	100,000^{*}
New Zealand (RMNZ)	Gold	7,500^{^}
Sweden (GLF)	Platinum	100,000^{^}
Switzerland (IFPI Switzerland)	Gold	25,000^{^}
United Kingdom (BPI)	Platinum	300,000^{^}
^{*} Sales figures based on certification alone.^{^} Shipments figures based on certification alone.
