= 17 Again (song) =

2000 single by Eurythmics

Single by Eurythmics

from the album Peace
- B-side: "Gospel Medley"
- Released: 10 January 2000
- Studio: The Church (London, England)
- Length: 4:53 (album version); 4:07 (radio mix)
- Label: RCA; 19; BMG
- Songwriters: Annie Lennox; David A. Stewart
- Producers: Eurythmics; Andy Wright

Eurythmics singles chronology
| "I Saved the World Today" (1999) | "17 Again" (2000) | "Peace Is Just a Word" (2000) |

Music video
- "17 Again" on YouTube

"17 Again" is a song by British pop duo Eurythmics from their eighth studio album, Peace (1999). It was released as the album's second single on 10 January 2000. The lyrics to the song find the duo reminiscing about their long-standing career in pop music. The closing of "17 Again" contains an interpolation of Eurythmics' 1983 single "Sweet Dreams (Are Made of This)".

"17 Again" peaked at number 27 on the UK Singles Chart, becoming the duo's 23rd UK top-40 hit. In the United States, it was serviced to adult contemporary radio outlets while promotional-only remixes were issued for nightclubs. The song became the first Eurythmics song to reach number one on the US Billboard Dance Club Play chart.

During an interview with Sain magazine, Dave Stewart recalled that Lennox presented him with the beginning of "17 Again" at The Church Studios in London; the two subsequently altered the song's mood over the course of its development.

== Track listings ==
UK CD1 and cassette single; European CD single

1. "17 Again" – 4:54
2. "Gospel Melody" (recorded live on the Peace Tour) – 9:34

UK CD2

1. "17 Again" – 4:54
2. "Here Comes the Rain Again" (recorded live on the Peace Tour) – 4:26
3. "Why" (recorded live on the Peace Tour) – 5:11
4. "17 Again" (the video)

== Charts ==
=== Weekly charts ===
Weekly chart performance for "17 Again"
| Chart (1999–2000) | Peak position |
|---|---|
| Canada Top Singles (RPM) | 57 |
| Canada Adult Contemporary (RPM) | 36 |
| Europe (Eurochart Hot 100 Singles) | 88 |
| Germany (GfK) | 73 |
| Ireland (IRMA) | 43 |
| Poland Airplay (Music & Media) | 4 |
| Scottish Singles Sales (Official Charts) | 25 |
| Switzerland (Schweizer Hitparade) | 67 |
| UK Singles (Official Charts) | 27 |
| US Dance Club Songs (Billboard) | 1 |

=== Year-end charts ===
Year-end chart performance for "17 Again"
| Chart (2000) | Position |
|---|---|
| US Dance Club Play (Billboard) | 43 |

== Release history ==
Release dates and formats for "17 Again"
| Region | Date | Format(s) | Label(s) | Ref(s). |
|---|---|---|---|---|
| United States | 4 October 1999 | Adult contemporary; hot adult contemporary; modern adult contemporary radio | Arista | |
| Europe | 10 January 2000 | CD | RCA; 19; BMG | |
| United Kingdom | 24 January 2000 | CD; cassette | RCA; 19; BMG | |

== See also ==
- List of number-one dance singles of 1999 (U.S.)
- List of Billboard Hot Dance Music/Club Play number ones of 2000
