= Don't Ask Me Why (Eurythmics song) =

Single by Eurythmics

from the album We Too Are One
- B-side: "Rich Girl"
- Released: 23 October 1989
- Recorded: 1988/89
- Genre: Pop
- Length: 4:21
- Label: RCA Records; Arista Records (US)
- Songwriters: Annie Lennox; David A. Stewart
- Producers: David A. Stewart; Jimmy Iovine

Eurythmics singles chronology
"Revival" (1989)	"Don't Ask Me Why" (1989)	"The King and Queen of America" (1990)

Music video
- "Don't Ask Me Why" on YouTube

Alternative cover
- US edition

"Don't Ask Me Why" is a song recorded by British pop music duo Eurythmics, released in October 1989 by RCA Records as the second single from their seventh album, We Too Are One (1989). The song was written by bandmembers Annie Lennox and David A. Stewart and produced by Stewart with Jimmy Iovine. In the US, it was released as the first single from the album by Arista Records. It is a lush pop song with melancholy and bitter lyrics which describe the ending of a love relationship. In it Lennox tells the subject "don't ask me why / I don't love you any more / I don't think I ever did". The accompanying music video was directed by Sophie Muller.

== Chart performance ==
"Don't Ask Me Why" peaked at number twenty-five in the UK singles chart and became Eurythmics' last US Billboard Hot 100 hit (and last top 40 hit), peaking at number forty (and twelve on the US Modern Rock Chart). Additionally, it was a top-20 hit also in Ireland, Italy and Luxembourg.

== Critical reception ==
American magazine Billboard described the song as a "subdued midtempo number", adding, "Lennox's vocal shines on a track that's not as immediate as prior releases but could easily be a sleeper." Mick Williams of the Lennox Herald gave the song a 9.5 out of 10 rating and commented: "If there ever was any doubt that Annie Lennox's voice was a gift from heaven, "Don't Ask Me Why" confirms it." A reviewer from Music & Media felt its appeal stemmed from the "poignant contrast between [the] enchanting harmonies and sad lyrics".

David Giles from Music Week wrote, "A distinct improvement on the rather histrionic blues of "Revival", this more subdued song allows Lennox's voice room for more expressiveness, and Stewart restrains himself admirably until an uncharacteristically twangy guitar break." Iestyn George of Record Mirror considered "Don't Ask Me Why" to be "a great deal meaner and moodier than the half-baked "Revival", but will probably get lost among the plethora of pop-dance records cluttering up the airwaves."

== Music video ==
The song's music video, directed by British director Sophie Muller, features a performance by Eurythmics with various members of a backing band. Filmed in bright, saturated colors the finished clip drew comparisons to nightclub scenes in David Lynch's film Blue Velvet.

== Track listings ==
- 7" (UK, GER, FR, SPA, AUS, USA, CAN) & K7 Single (UK, AUS, USA, CAN) & CD single (JAP)
1. "Don't Ask Me Why" (LP Version) – 4:21
2. "Rich Girl" (Non-LP Track) – 4:09
- 12" (UK, GER) & CD single (UK, GER)
1. "Don't Ask Me Why" (LP Version) – 4:21
2. "Sylvia" (LP Version) – 4:35
3. "Rich Girl" (Non-LP Track) – 4:09
- Limited 12" (UK) & Limited CD single Box-Set (UK)
1. "Don't Ask Me Why" (LP Version) – 4:21
2. "Rich Girl" (Non-LP Track) – 4:09
3. "When The Day Goes Down" (Acoustic Version) – 3:47
4. "Don't Ask Me Why" (Acoustic Version) – 3:58

== Charts ==
Chart performance for "Don't Ask Me Why"
Chart (1989–1990)	Peak position
Australia (ARIA)	35
Belgium (Ultratop 50 Flanders)	31
Canada Top Singles (RPM)	13
Canada Adult Contemporary (RPM)	1
Europe (Eurochart Hot 100 Singles)	61
Ireland (IRMA)	17
Italy (Musica e dischi)	16
Luxembourg (Radio Luxembourg)	20
Netherlands (Dutch Top 40 Tipparade)	2
Netherlands (Single Top 100)	45
Switzerland (Schweizer Hitparade)	30
UK Singles (Official Charts)	25
US Billboard Hot 100	40
US Alternative Airplay (Billboard)	12
US Cash Box Top 100	37
West Germany (GfK)	56
