= I Saved the World Today =

1999 single by Eurythmics

Single by Eurythmics

from the album Peace
- B-side: "Lifted"
- Released: 4 October 1999
- Studio: The Church (North London)
- Length: 4:52 (album version); 4:27 (radio edit)
- Label: RCA; 19; BMG
- Songwriters: Annie Lennox; David A. Stewart
- Producers: Eurythmics; Andy Wright

Eurythmics singles chronology
"Sweet Dreams (Are Made of This) '91" (remix) (1991)	"I Saved the World Today" (1999)	"17 Again" (2000)

Music video
- "I Saved the World Today" on YouTube

"I Saved the World Today" is a song recorded by British pop music duo Eurythmics for their eighth studio album, Peace (1999). It was written and co-produced by band members Annie Lennox and David A. Stewart.

The song was released as the first single from the album and returned Eurythmics to the UK Singles Chart for the first time in nearly a decade, peaking at number 11. It peaked within the top 10 in several countries, including Finland, Greece, Hungary, and Italy. In the United States, the song was added to adult contemporary radio in January 2000.

== Background ==
Producer Andy Wright said, "The first time I met Annie Lennox she was sitting at a piano playing something new that she'd been working on – the chord progression to what turned out to be the song, "I Saved The World Today". ... We began work at The Church Studios in North London, Dave's studio, a place I was very familiar with. Annie was sitting playing the piano in the upstairs studio which has a very big live room, and we began straight away. "I Saved The World Today" was the first thing we did. I put together a beat and some ideas, Annie recorded some piano, we put down a guide vocal, Dave came up with a great Rickenbacker 12-string guitar part, and the song just started to emerge."

In an interview with Sain magazine, Lennox summarized the general premise of the song:

It's a song that really sums up feelings that I have, and what a lot of people have. It's about feeling impotent in the face of extreme violence, in the form of warfare or tragedies we're bombarded with every day in the media. It's about 'If only someone could do that' and the implausibility of that idea. I feel very sad about this song sometimes.

== Charts ==
Weekly chart performance for "I Saved the World Today"
Chart (1999)	Peak position
Australia (ARIA)	85
Austria (Ö3 Austria Top 40)	18
Belgium (Ultratop 50 Flanders)	36
Belgium (Ultratop 50 Wallonia)	12
Croatia International Airplay (HRT)	1
Europe (Eurochart Hot 100 Singles)	21
Finland (Suomen virallinen lista)	2
Germany (GfK)	28
Greece (IFPI)	8
Hungary (MAHASZ)	6
Iceland (Íslenski Listinn Topp 40)	30
Ireland (IRMA)	23
Italy (Musica e dischi)	7
Italy Airplay (Music & Media)	2
Netherlands (Dutch Top 40 Tipparade)	2
Netherlands (Single Top 100)	44
New Zealand (Recorded Music NZ)	33
Scotland Singles (OCC)	15
Spain (Promusicae)	16
Sweden (Sverigetopplistan)	31
Switzerland (Schweizer Hitparade)	16
UK Singles (OCC)	11

== Release history ==
Release dates and formats for "I Saved the World Today"
Region	Date	Format(s)	Label(s)	Ref.
Worldwide	20 September 1999	Radio	RCA; 19; BMG	
United Kingdom	4 October 1999	CD; cassette	RCA; 19; BMG	
Canada	26 October 1999	CD	RCA; 19; BMG	
United States	17 January 2000	Adult contemporary; hot adult contemporary; modern adult contemporary radio	Arista	
