= Revival (Eurythmics song) =

Single by Eurythmics

from the album We Too Are One
- B-side: "Precious"
- Released: 14 August 1989
- Recorded: 1989
- Genre: Pop rock, soul
- Length: 4:04
- Label: RCA Records
- Songwriters: Lennox, Stewart, Charlie Wilson, Patrick Seymour
- Producers: David A. Stewart, Jimmy Iovine

Eurythmics singles chronology
"You Have Placed a Chill in My Heart" (1988)	"Revival" (1989)	"Don't Ask Me Why" (1989)

Music video
- "Revival" on YouTube

"Revival" is a 1989 song by the British pop music duo Eurythmics. It was written by group members Annie Lennox and David A. Stewart, along with keyboardist Pat Seymour and vocalist Charlie Wilson (of the Gap Band) who also sang backing vocals for the track. Produced by Stewart and Jimmy Iovine, it was the first single to be released from Eurythmics' 1989 album We Too Are One.

Lennox and Stewart returned to a rock/R&B sound for the album, and "Revival" is an uptempo tune which lyrically is a call for renewal and encouragement. The single reached number 26 in the UK, and was the duo's sixteenth (and final) top 20 single in Australia. "Revival" was not released as a single in the United States.

Music & Media characterised the song as "a raunchy, brassy and muscular R&B song in the Aretha Franklin tradition" with a "good hookline."

== Track listing ==
UK 7" single

1. "Revival" (LP Version) - 4:09
2. "Precious" (non-LP track) - 3:40

UK 12" single / CD single

1. "Revival" (E.T. Dance Mix) - 6:25
2. "Revival" (LP Version) - 4:09
3. "Precious" (non-LP track) - 3:40

* The B-side track, "Precious", is a Eurythmics composition and is unrelated to the 1992 solo track by Annie Lennox.

== Charts ==
Weekly chart performance for "Revival"
Chart (1989)	Peak position
Australia (ARIA)	14
Belgium (Ultratop 50 Flanders)	19
Europe (Eurochart Hot 100 Singles)	27
Finland (Suomen virallinen lista)	13
France (SNEP)	46
Ireland (IRMA)	14
Italy (Musica e dischi)	9
Italy Airplay (Music & Media)	5
Netherlands (Dutch Top 40)	25
Netherlands (Single Top 100)	25
New Zealand (Recorded Music NZ)	21
Sweden (Sverigetopplistan)	7
Switzerland (Schweizer Hitparade)	8
UK Singles (Official Charts)	26
West Germany (GfK)	33
