= We Too Are One =

1989 studio album by Eurythmics

Studio album by Eurythmics
- Released: 11 September 1989
- Recorded: August 1988 – May 1989
- Studios: Power Station (New York City); Grande Armée (Paris)
- Genres: Synth-pop; pop rock
- Length: 47:00
- Label: RCA
- Producers: David A. Stewart; Jimmy Iovine

Eurythmics chronology
Savage (1987)	We Too Are One (1989)	Greatest Hits (1991)

Singles from We Too Are One
- 1. "Revival" Released: 14 August 1989; 2. "Don't Ask Me Why" Released: 23 October 1989; 3. "The King and Queen of America" Released: 22 January 1990; 4. "(My My) Baby's Gonna Cry" Released: February 1990 (US); 5. "Angel" Released: 23 April 1990

Professional ratings
Review scores
Source	Rating
AllMusic	3/5 stars
Chicago Tribune	2/4 stars
Robert Christgau	C+
Los Angeles Times	2.5/5 stars
The New York Times	Positive
NME	7/10
Q	4/5 stars
Record Mirror	2.5/5 stars
Smash Hits	8.5/10
Associated Press	A

We Too Are One is the seventh studio album by the British pop duo Eurythmics, released on 11 September 1989 by RCA Records. It would be the duo's last studio release until 1999's Peace.

== Background and release ==
When it was released in 1989, the album debuted at number one in the United Kingdom, where it has since been certified double platinum. It spawned four singles, all of which reached the UK top 30: "Revival", "Don't Ask Me Why", "The King and Queen of America", and "Angel". In North America, "(My My) Baby's Gonna Cry" was also released as a single; it charted at number 58 in Canada, while failing to chart in the United States.

In an interview published in the 9 September 1989 edition of Music & Media, the publication listed the title track as a planned single rather than "Don't Ask Me Why". Stewart commented that the title track would have been backed with a song titled, "We Four Are Three", which "starts off with Annie whispering 'We Too Are One' with a repeat on it", that "just turns into this kind of psychedelic Indian raga.

On 14 November 2005, Sony BMG repackaged and released Eurythmics' back catalogue as Deluxe Edition reissues, including We Too Are One. The original track listing was supplemented with bonus tracks and remixes.

=== Home media ===
A companion home video, We Two Are One Too, was released in 1990, featuring the music videos for the five singles from the album and footage of the band performing the album's other tracks. This is the only commercial release of the promotional video for the 1989 single "Revival", which has never been included on any subsequent video compilations from the band.

== Critical reception ==
In their review for New Musical Express, Terry Staunton thought that We Too Are One was a "very good pop record" that was a step down in quality from their previous album, Savage. Staunton concluded the review by saying that We Too Are One "may be regarded by some as a therapeutic exercise for the emotionally battered Annie Lennox, but it's also a lovingly-crafted record. Not quite a step forward after Savage, but more than a time-buying sidestep. Let's say they've gone diagonally."

Music & Media characterised We Too Are One as a "very commercial rock album, with lots of soulful swing and clever, semi-synthesized backings". They believed that "the strings and sound effects have been overdone in places", although they found the songs to be "powerful" with "catchy brass licks and punchy hooks". Writing for Smash Hits, Sian Pattenden felt that the album was "a fine LP filled with 'crashing' anthems", citing "Revival" and the title track as examples. Record Mirror was more critical of the album and lamented that the band had "found it necessary to not only resort to traditional instrumentation but also to ransacking the past."

== Track listing ==
All tracks are written by Annie Lennox and David A. Stewart, except where noted.

No.	Title	Writer(s)	Length
1.	"We Two Are One"		4:32
2.	"The King and Queen of America"		4:31
3.	"(My My) Baby's Gonna Cry"		4:54
4.	"Don't Ask Me Why"		4:21
5.	"Angel"		5:10
6.	"Revival"	Lennox; Stewart; Charlie Wilson; Patrick Seymour	4:06
7.	"You Hurt Me (And I Hate You)"	Lennox; Stewart; Chucho Merchán	4:23
8.	"Sylvia"		4:25
9.	"How Long?"		4:41
10.	"When the Day Goes Down"		5:57
Total length:			47:00

2005 remastered CD bonus tracks
No.	Title	Writer(s)	Length
11.	"Precious"	Lennox; Stewart; Wilson; Seymour	3:36
12.	"See No Evil"		4:06
13.	"The King and Queen of America" (dance remix)		6:11
14.	"Angel" (choir version)		5:47
15.	"Last Night I Dreamt That Somebody Loved Me"	Johnny Marr; Morrissey	3:24
Total length:			70:04

== Personnel ==
Credits adapted from the liner notes of We Too Are One.

=== Eurythmics ===
- Annie Lennox – vocals
- David A. Stewart – guitars, vocals

=== Additional musicians ===
- Pat Seymour – keyboards
- Olle Romo – drums
- Charlie Wilson – backing vocals
- Chucho Merchán – programming

=== Technical ===
- David A. Stewart – production
- Jimmy Iovine – production
- Bruce Lampcov – recording engineering, mixing engineering
- Don Smith – recording engineering, mixing engineering
- Manu Guiot – additional engineering
- Rob Jaczko, Serge Pauchard, Lee Manning – engineering assistance
- Tony Quinn, Eileen Gregory, Greg McCarty – production assistance

=== Artwork ===
- Jean-Baptiste Mondino – photography
- Laurence Stevens – design, artwork

== Charts ==
=== Weekly charts ===
Weekly chart performance for We Too Are One
Chart (1989)	Peak position
Australian Albums (ARIA)	7
Austrian Albums (Ö3 Austria)	20
Belgian Albums (IFPI)	1
Canada Top Albums/CDs (RPM)	12
Danish Albums (Hitlisten)	1
Dutch Albums (Album Top 100)	18
European Albums (Music & Media)	3
Finnish Albums (Suomen virallinen lista)	7
French Albums (IFOP)	11
German Albums (Offizielle Top 100)	4
Greek Albums (IFPI)	3
Irish Albums (IFPI)	2
Italian Albums (Musica e dischi)	6
Japanese Albums (Oricon)	51
New Zealand Albums (RMNZ)	8
Norwegian Albums (VG-lista)	3
Swedish Albums (Sverigetopplistan)	1
Swiss Albums (Schweizer Hitparade)	2
UK Albums (Official Charts)	1
US Billboard 200	34

=== Year-end charts ===
Year-end chart performance for We Too Are One
Chart (1989)	Position
Australian Albums (ARIA)	58
Canada Top Albums/CDs (RPM)	60
European Albums (Music & Media)	42
Norwegian Autumn Period Albums (VG-lista)	12
UK Albums (Gallup)	26

== Certifications ==
Certifications for We Too Are One
Region	Certification	Certified units/sales
Australia (ARIA)	Platinum	70,000^{^}
Canada (Music Canada)	Platinum	100,000^{^}
France (SNEP)	Platinum	300,000^{*}
Spain (Promusicae)	Gold	50,000^{^}
Sweden (GLF)	Platinum	100,000^{^}
Switzerland (IFPI Switzerland)	Gold	25,000^{^}
United Kingdom (BPI)	2× Platinum	600,000^{^}
^{*} Sales figures based on certification alone.^{^} Shipments figures based on certification alone.
