= You Have Placed a Chill in My Heart =

1988 single by Eurythmics

Single by Eurythmics

from the album Savage
- B-side: "You Have Placed a Chill in My Heart" (acoustic) (Europe); "Wide Eyed Girl" (North America)
- Released: 31 May 1988
- Studio: Chateau de Dangu (Normandy, France)
- Genre: Synth-pop
- Length: 3:50
- Label: RCA
- Songwriters: Annie Lennox; David A. Stewart
- Producer: David A. Stewart

Eurythmics singles chronology
"I Need a Man" (1988)	"You Have Placed a Chill in My Heart" (1988)	"Revival" (1989)

Music video
- "You Have Placed a Chill in My Heart" on YouTube

"You Have Placed a Chill in My Heart" is a song by British pop duo Eurythmics. It was written by group members Annie Lennox and David A. Stewart, and appears on the duo's sixth studio album, Savage (1987). The song was released in May 1988 by RCA as the fourth and final single from the album in the United Kingdom and as the second in the United States. In the first, it was the only single from the album to reach the top 20 on the UK Singles Chart, peaking at number 16 (the duo's 12th overall). The music video for the song was directed by Sophie Muller.

== Composition ==
The track is driven by a drum machine and is a mostly synth-based ballad. Lyrically, Lennox sings of mustering the power to leave a destructive relationship with a lover who does not return the affection she deserves ("...a woman's just too tired to think / about the dirty old dishes in the kitchen sink").

== Critical reception ==
A reviewer from Cash Box called "You Have Placed a Chill in My Heart" an "arresting, riveting record" and praised Lennox's "powerful, beefy [vocal] performance." David Stubbs from Melody Maker said, "Dotted with Lennox's dramatically inept, watery squeals, like those of an orgasmic weasel, this is an electro-pop song about love, which, we are told, is pure, blind, hot and cold. So is water, Annie. Another risible and irrelevant exercise in passion, still haunted by the plump ghost of 'Retha." Pan-European magazine Music & Media wrote, "Another spellbinding song from the beautiful Savage LP. Both rocking and contemplative and carrying an inescapeable groove."

== Music video ==
The song's accompanying music video continued the concept directed by British director Sophie Muller (seen earlier in the videos for the singles "Beethoven (I Love to Listen To)" and "I Need a Man", and throughout most of the Savage video album).

== Track listings ==
- 7-inch: RCA (UK, WEST GERMANY, SPA, AUS, JP)
1. "You Have Placed a Chill in My Heart" (LP version) – 3:52
2. "You Have Placed a Chill in My Heart" (acoustic version) – 3:20

Note: Acoustic version was recorded at Corbin Hall, 1988

- 7-inch: RCA (CAN)
1. "You Have Placed a Chill in My Heart" (LP version) – 3:52
2. "Wide Eyed Girl" (LP version) – 3:34
- 7-inch: RCA (US)
1. "You Have Placed a Chill in My Heart" (LP version) – 3:52
2. "Wide Eyed Girl" (LP version) – 3:34

Note: The US promo 7-inch single has the A-side as "Chill Mix" 4:00

- 12-inch: RCA (UK, WEST GERMANY)
1. "You Have Placed a Chill in My Heart" (dance mix) – 7:52
2. "Do You Want to Break Up?" (dance mix) – 6:12
3. "You Have Placed a Chill in My Heart" (acoustic version) – 3:20
- 12-inch: RCA (US)
1. "You Have Placed a Chill in My Heart" (LP version) – 3:52
2. "Here Comes the Rain Again" (live version) – 7:36
3. "Wide Eyed Girl" (LP version) – 3:34

Note: Live version recorded in Sydney, February 1987

- CD single: RCA (UK)
1. "You Have Placed a Chill in My Heart" (LP version) – 3:52
2. "Do You Want to Break Up?" (LP version) – 3:40
3. "Here Comes the Rain Again" (live version)* – 7:39
4. "You Have Placed a Chill in My Heart" (acoustic version) – 3:27

Note: Live version recorded in Sydney, February 1987

== Credits and personnel ==
- Annie Lennox – songwriter
- David A. Stewart – producer, songwriter
- Mastered at Sterling

== Awards and nominations ==
Year	Awards	Category	Result	Ref.
1989	1988 Music Week Awards	Best Sleeve Design Award	Won	

== Charts ==
=== Weekly charts ===
Weekly chart performance for "You Have Placed a Chill in My Heart"
Chart (1988)	Peak position
Canada Top Singles (RPM)	55
Europe (Eurochart Hot 100 Singles)	54
Ireland (IRMA)	15
Italy Airplay (Music & Media)	1
New Zealand (Recorded Music NZ)	31
UK Singles (Official Charts)	16
US Billboard Hot 100	64
