= Shame (Eurythmics song) =

Single by Eurythmics

from the album Savage
- B-side: "I've Got a Lover (Back in Japan)" (LP Version)
- Released: 7 December 1987
- Recorded: May 1987
- Studio: Chateau de Dangu (Normandy, France)
- Genre: Synth-pop
- Length: 3:46 (single version) 4:30 (album version)
- Label: RCA Records
- Songwriters: Annie Lennox, David A. Stewart
- Producer: David A. Stewart

Eurythmics singles chronology
"Beethoven (I Love to Listen To)" (1987)	"Shame" (1987)	"I Need a Man" (1988)

Audio video
- "Shame" on YouTube

"Shame" is a song recorded by British pop music duo Eurythmics. It was written by band members Annie Lennox and David A. Stewart and produced by Stewart. The song appears on the duo's sixth studio album Savage and was released as the second single in the UK. "Shame" was not released in the United States.

The track is a synthpop ballad in which the protagonist expresses regret and disdain for excessive and shallow lifestyles led by those who frequent nightclubs, bars, parties and the like. The lyrics namecheck The Beatles and The Rolling Stones and mentions the songs "All You Need is Love" and "We Love You".

"Shame" stalled at number forty-one despite spending 7 weeks in the UK singles chart, the first Eurythmics single to miss the UK Top 40 since "Julia" in 1985. It proved to be an airplay hit in Spain, with Radio España 97.2 including it in its playlist upon its release in the country.

== Track listings ==
=== 7":RCA (UK, GER, FR, SP, AUS, JP) ===
1. "Shame" (7" Version) – 3:46
2. "I've Got A Lover (Back In Japan)" (LP Version) – 4:33

=== 12":RCA (UK, GER, FR, SP, AUS) ===
1. "Shame" (Dance Mix) – 5:44
2. "I've Got A Lover (Back In Japan)" (LP Version) – 4:33
3. "Shame" (LP Version) – 4:23

=== CD Single:RCA (UK, GER) ===
1. "Shame" (Dance Mix) – 5:44
2. "I've Got A Lover (Back In Japan)" (LP Version) – 4:33
3. "There Must Be An Angel (Playing With My Heart)" (Live Version)* – 7:15
- live version recorded in Sydney, 1987

== Critical reception ==
On its release as a single, Neil Taylor of New Musical Express praised "Shame" as "an alluring tune [which] beckon[s] you to the safe portals of crackerjack clubland" and a "great single". He added that it is "a great record for sipping your glasnost and lime to". Lawrence Donegan, as guest reviewer for Record Mirror, described it as "a wonderful single" and added, "Behind the sorry mess that is Dave Stewart's hair there lies a pop genius."

In a review of Savage, Musician described the song as having "icy passion", and The Orlando Sentinel noted its "slow, ethereal arrangement." The Toledo Blade commented that songs on the album like "Shame" "sound lush and full, but the plea in the lyrics is almost desperate: a human longing to be touched instead of crushed by others". The Bulletin noted the song "takes on the idea of raised expectations generated by the media and nails it down as patently false. Everything is a con job... everything from movies to TV to the Beatles and the Rolling Stones." Spare Rib considered the lyrics to cover "success and disillusion".

== Charts ==
=== Weekly charts ===
Weekly chart performance for "Shame"
Chart (1988)	Peak position
Australia (Kent Music Report)	39
Belgium (Ultratop 50 Flanders)	37
Europe (European Hot 100 Singles)	77
Italy (Musica e dischi)	18
Italy Airplay (Music & Media)	1
Netherlands (Single Top 100)	44
Netherlands (Dutch Top 40 Tipparade)	13
New Zealand (Recorded Music NZ)	23
South Africa (Springbok Radio)	16
UK Singles (OCC)	41
West Germany (GfK)	53
