= I Need a Man (Eurythmics song) =

Single by Eurythmics

from the album Savage
- B-side: "I Need You" (Europe, Australia, New Zealand) "Heaven" (North America)
- Released: 28 March 1988
- Recorded: May 1987
- Studio: Chateau de Dangu (Normandy, France)
- Genre: Rock
- Length: 4:06 (single version); 4:21 (album version)
- Label: RCA
- Songwriters: Annie Lennox; David A. Stewart
- Producer: David A. Stewart

Eurythmics singles chronology
"Shame" (1987)	"I Need a Man" (1988)	"You Have Placed a Chill in My Heart" (1988)

Music video
- "I Need a Man" on YouTube

"I Need a Man" is a song recorded by British pop music duo Eurythmics. It was written by band members Annie Lennox and David A. Stewart and produced by Stewart. Taken from their sixth album, Savage (1987), the song was released in May 1988 by RCA Records as the third single in the UK and the second single in the United States.

The track is a pop/rock number with an aggressive, commanding vocal performance by Lennox, in which she explains all of the things she does not want in a man ("...and he don't wear a dress!"). The music video was the second part of a series directed by Sophie Muller. Part one, for the song "Beethoven (I Love to Listen To)", ended with Lennox's character leaving her home after transforming herself from a neurotic housewife into a disco vixen à la Marilyn Monroe. Here, the character ends up performing "I Need a Man" in a dimly-lit nightclub.

== Chart performance ==
"I Need a Man" climbed to number twenty-six in the UK singles chart. The first single released from Savage in the U.S., the song peaked at number forty-six on the Billboard Hot 100. The song was paired as a double A-side with "Beethoven" on the American 12 inch single and hit number six on the Hot Dance Club Play chart.

== Critical reception ==
Billboard called "I Need a Man" one of Lennox's "finest vocal performances". Cash Box said that "Lennox delivers a sexy, sassy, soulful performance." Neil Taylor from NME commented, "The stop/start nature of the guitar in this record sounds like an early-'70s Stones rip off, the result perhaps of Dave Stewart's mingling with famous mates. Is it my turn? asks Annie Lennox at the start of this and then drags us through a collage of lyrics sang to the same beat as the Rowing Boat song. The song is as competent as you would expect from one of the world's most accomplished bands, but it does suggest that the Eurythmics' glory might be fading."

James Hamilton from Record Mirror wrote in his dance column, "Dreadfully disappointing late period Rolling Stones-style 126bpm snarling empty strutter — a shame they seem so completely to have lost their earlier consistent touch these days". Ro Newton from Smash Hits said, "Annie Lennox sounds like a desperate woman as she grunts and growls her way through this "raunchy" number which basically says that she (ahem) would like some male company for the night, thank you very much."

== Track listings ==
- 7": RCA (UK, GER, AUS)
1. "I Need a Man" (LP Version) – 4:23
2. "I Need You" (LP Version) – 3:22
- 7": RCA (CAN, US)
1. "I Need a Man" (7" Edit) – 4:06
2. "Heaven" (LP Version) – 3:27
- 10": RCA (UK)
1. "I Need a Man" (Live Version)* – 4:35
2. "I Need a Man" (LP Version) – 4:23
3. "I Need You" (LP Version) – 3:22

Note: Live version was recorded at Corbin Hall, 1988

- 12": RCA (UK, GER, AUS)
1. "I Need a Man" (Macho Mix) – 6:01
2. "I Need a Man" (LP Version) – 4:23
3. "I Need You" (LP Version) – 3:22
- 12": RCA (US)
1. "I Need a Man" (Macho Mix) – 6:01
2. "I Need a Man" (7" Edit) – 4:06
3. "Beethoven (I Love To Listen To)" (Dance Mix) – 4:42
4. "Beethoven (I Love To Listen To)" (7" Edit) – 3:47
- CD single: RCA (UK)
1. "I Need a Man" (LP Version) – 4:23
2. "Missionary Man" (Live Version)* – 5:18
3. "I Need You" (LP Version) – 3:52
4. "I Need a Man" (Macho Mix) – 6:01

Note: Live version was recorded in Sydney, 1987 and also appears on Live 1983-1989

- Promo CD single: RCA (US)
1. "I Need a Man" (7" Edit) – 4:06

== Charts ==
Chart performance for "I Need a Man"
Chart (1988)	Peak position
Australia (Kent Music Report)	78
Belgium (Ultratop 50 Flanders)	35
Canada Top Singles (RPM)	14
Europe (Eurochart Hot 100 Singles)	84
Ireland (IRMA)	23
New Zealand (Recorded Music NZ)	19
UK Singles (Official Charts)	26
US Billboard Hot 100	46
US Dance Club Songs (Billboard) with "Beethoven (I Love to Listen To)"	6
US Dance Singles Sales (Billboard) with "Beethoven (I Love to Listen To)"	13
US Mainstream Rock (Billboard)	32
US Cash Box Top 100	62
