= The King and Queen of America =

Single by Eurythmics

from the album We Too Are One
- B-side: "See No Evil"
- Released: 22 January 1990
- Recorded: September 1988
- Genre: Pop rock
- Length: 4:31
- Label: RCA Records
- Songwriters: Annie Lennox; David A. Stewart
- Producers: David A. Stewart; Jimmy Iovine

Eurythmics singles chronology
| "Don't Ask Me Why" (1989) | "The King and Queen of America" (1990) | "(My My) Baby's Gonna Cry" (1990) |

Music video
- "The King and Queen of America" on YouTube

"The King and Queen of America" is a song recorded by pop music duo Eurythmics. It was written by group members Annie Lennox and David A. Stewart and produced by Stewart with Jimmy Iovine. The track appears on their album We Too Are One and was released as the album's third UK single in January 1990.

The song's music video showed Lennox and Stewart in a variety of costumes and settings which parodied various aspects of American pop culture, including a game show host and hostess, singing cowboy and cowgirl à la Roy Rogers and Dale Evans, and Ronald and Nancy Reagan.

Although not released as a single in the United States, "The King and Queen of America" received a fair amount of airplay on MTV.

== Background ==
Speaking to the Chicago Tribune in 1989, Lennox spoke about the song and its message:

"It's an angry song that stems from one of my pet hates, which is the cult of personality. In America in particular, people want to invite the media into their living rooms and show off their love lives. The couple in the song are completely sold on all the glittering icons that are supposed to mean success and the attainment of the American dream. I'm very curious about what success is and wonder why people won't look at it more critically."

== Track listings ==
=== CD single ===
1. "The King and Queen of America" (Album Version) - 4:31
2. "There Must Be an Angel (Playing with My Heart)" (Live) - 6:30*
3. "I Love You Like a Ball and Chain" (Live) - 4:41*
4. "See No Evil" (Non-LP Track) - 4:10
- same recording found on Live 1983–1989

=== 7" single ===
- A: "The King and Queen of America" (Album Version) - 4:31
- B: "See No Evil" (Non-LP Track) - 4:10

=== 12" single ===
- A: "The King and Queen of America" (Dance Remix) - 6:11
- B1: "The King and Queen of America" (Dub Remix) - 4:52
- B2: "See No Evil" (Non-LP Track) - 4:10

=== 12" single ===
- A: "The King and Queen of America" (Dub Remix) - 4:52
- B1: "The King and Queen of America" (Album Version) - 4:31
- B2: "The King and Queen of America" (Dance Remix) - 6:11

== Charts ==
Chart performance for "The King and Queen of America"
| Chart (1990) | Peak position |
|---|---|
| Australia (ARIA) | 72 |
| Belgium (Ultratop 50 Flanders) | 33 |
| Europe (Eurochart Hot 100 Singles) | 73 |
| Ireland (IRMA) | 23 |
| Netherlands (Dutch Top 40) | 33 |
| Netherlands (Single Top 100) | 38 |
| UK Singles (OCC) | 29 |
| West Germany (GfK) | 51 |
