= Peace (Eurythmics album) =

Studio album by Eurythmics
- Released: 18 October 1999
- Recorded: 1998–1999
- Studio: The Church (London)
- Genres: Pop rock; synth-pop
- Length: 48:59
- Label: RCA
- Producer: Eurythmics

Eurythmics chronology
Live 1983–1989 (1993)	Peace (1999)	Ultimate Collection (2005)

Singles from Peace
- 1. "I Saved the World Today" Released: 4 October 1999; 2. "17 Again" Released: 10 January 2000; 3. "Power to the Meek" Released: 18 January 2000; 4. "Peace Is Just a Word" Released: 15 May 2000

Peace is the eighth and final studio album by British pop duo Eurythmics, released on 18 October 1999 by RCA Records. It was the band's first album of new material in 10 years, following 1989's We Too Are One.

== Background and release ==
After their first performance together in eight years at a record company party in 1998, Annie Lennox and David A. Stewart began writing and recording together for the first time since 1989. After a benefit concert at the Institute of Contemporary Arts for the family of Ruth Picardie, a journalist who died of breast cancer, the duo convened at The Church Studios to write new music. The band had previously recorded their Sweet Dreams (Are Made of This) album at the facility, which they had rented and converted into a recording studio. By the time they received news of their upcoming Brit Award for Outstanding Contribution to Music, the band had amassed half an album's worth of songs.

Much of the songwriting took place in the recording studio, where the two songwriters frequently restructured and rearranged their material. Stewart described the process as "creating a collage", where his rough melodic ideas and Lennox's lyrics would go through multiple iterations until they arrived at the final product. The band used a Marantz CDR640 CD recorder for the project, which Stewart selected because of its audio capabilities. "At the end of the session, I can take away a true representation of what we have done. I can listen to alternative mixes or listen back to a different arrangement in the car or at home and know I'm hearing the same thing that I hear in the studio."

The album's title was designed to reflect the duo's ongoing concern with global conflict and world peace. It was promoted with a concert on the Greenpeace vessel Rainbow Warrior II, where they played a mixture of old and new songs. A world tour, titled the Peacetour, followed soon after, with all profits donated to Amnesty International and Greenpeace. The final show of the tour, on 6 December 1999 at the London Docklands Arena, was filmed and released on VHS and DVD.

=== Singles ===
"I Saved the World Today" served as the lead single from the album, reaching number 11 on the UK singles chart—their highest-charting single there since 1986. The second single, "17 Again", was released in January 2000. It reached the UK top 30 and topped the US Hot Dance Club Play chart. In May 2000, "Peace Is Just a Word" was released as a promotional single in the United Kingdom with "Beautiful Child" as its B-side. In the US, "Power To The Meek" was issued as a promotional single.

=== 2005 re-release ===
On 14 November 2005, Sony BMG repackaged and released Eurythmics' back catalogue as "Deluxe Edition Reissues". Each of their eight studio albums' original track listings were supplemented with bonus tracks and remixes. For unknown reasons, many songs on the 2005 reissue of Peace are alternate mixes compared to the original 1999 release. The most dramatically different mix is "I've Tried Everything", which is more upbeat with additional drums. Other songs with mix differences include "17 Again", "I Saved the World Today", "Forever" and "Power to the Meek" (missing a verse from the original version), and live tracks were substituted for the original studio versions of "I Want It All" and "Peace Is Just a Word".

== Critical reception ==
Professional ratings
Review scores
Source	Rating
AllMusic	3/5 stars
Entertainment Weekly	B+
Houston Chronicle	2/5 stars
Los Angeles Times	3/4 stars
Q	4/5 stars
Rolling Stone	3/5 stars
Slant Magazine	3.5/5 stars

Critical reception to Peace was generally positive, with reviewers praising the strength of Lennox's vocal performances and the album's ambitious production, though several noted a reduction in the duo’s earlier energy and stylistic edge. Richard Cromelin of The Los Angeles Times highlighted the album's confident presentation and the richness of its orchestral production, arguing that it marked a strong return for the duo. He emphasised the emotional tension underlying its restrained surface and praised Lennox’s voice for its renewed power and expressive range throughout the record. Ian Cranna of Q described Peace as a surprisingly assured reunion, noting that Lennox and Stewart sounded "like they've never been away" after a decade apart. He noted the album's emotional vulnerability, strong songwriting and consistent tunefulness, while observing that it lacked some of the duo’s earlier neurotic edge.

Rob Brunner of Entertainment Weekly noted that the album deliberately departs from the duo's earlier synth-pop style in favour of orchestral pop arrangements that foreground Lennox's vocals. While he praised her expressive performance on several songs, he suggested that the dense production sometimes overwhelms the album's more intimate songwriting. Hot Press editor Joe Jackson characterised Peace as a cautious return that softens the techno-driven energy and emotional intensity of earlier Eurythmics work. He highlighted Lennox's vocal strength on tracks including "Anything But Strong" and "Peace Is Just a Word," but argued that the album’s lyrical tone can at times feel overly preachy, with its strongest material appearing in its latter half. Barry Walters of Rolling Stone noted that Peace functions as a quasi-concept album reflecting on the duo's relationship and history. He argued that, although it incorporates ornate orchestral arrangements and occasional rock elements, the album largely moves away from the hook-driven synth-pop of their peak period, resulting in a more subdued, symphonic sound that "lacks the old urgency." Dan Aquilante of The New York Post offered a more reserved assessment, stating that Peace does not fully match the duo's earlier heights. However, he acknowledged that its strongest tracks, such as "I Want It All," remain effective within the Eurythmics' established pop framework.

== Track listing ==
All tracks are written by Annie Lennox and David A. Stewart, except "Something In the Air" by Speedy Keen.

No.	Title	Length
1.	"17 Again"	4:55
2.	"I Saved the World Today"	4:53
3.	"Power to the Meek"	3:18
4.	"Beautiful Child"	3:27
5.	"Anything but Strong"	5:04
6.	"Peace Is Just a Word"	5:51
7.	"I've Tried Everything"	4:17
8.	"I Want It All"	3:32
9.	"My True Love"	4:45
10.	"Forever"	4:08
11.	"Lifted"	4:49
Total length:		48:59

2005 remastered deluxe edition bonus tracks
No.	Title	Length
12.	"Beautiful Child" (acoustic version)	3:18
13.	"17 Again" (acoustic version)	4:27
14.	"I Saved the World Today" (acoustic version)	2:32
15.	"Something In the Air"	3:46

== Personnel ==
Credits adapted from the liner notes of Peace.

=== Eurythmics ===
- Dave Stewart – guitars
- Annie Lennox – vocals

=== Additional musicians ===
- Andy Wright – programming, keyboards, live percussion
- Chucho Merchán – bass (tracks 2, 6)
- Dave Catlin-Birch – bass (tracks 4, 9–11)
- Steve Lewinson – bass (tracks 1, 3, 5, 8)
- Pete Lewinson – drums (tracks 1, 3, 5–8)
- Chris Sharrock – drums (tracks 2, 4, 9–11)
- David Whitaker – strings orchestration (tracks 1, 2, 4–7, 9–11)
- Pro Arte Orchestra of London – orchestra
- Colin Sheen – orchestra coordination

=== Technical ===
- Eurythmics – production
- Andy Wright – additional production
- Nick Addison – engineering
- Graham Dominy – engineering assistance
- Ash Howes – mixing at Whitfield Street Studios (London)
- David Russell – mixing assistance
- Gary McGovern – technical supervisor
- Ian Cooper – mastering at Metropolis Mastering (London)
- Stephen McLaughlin – strings engineering (tracks 1, 2, 4–7, 9–11)

=== Artwork ===
- Richard Avedon – sleeve photography
- Laurence Stevens – sleeve design, graphics

== Charts ==
=== Weekly charts ===
Weekly chart performance for Peace
Chart (1999)	Peak position
Australian Albums (ARIA)	8
Austrian Albums (Ö3 Austria)	7
Belgian Albums (Ultratop Flanders)	9
Belgian Albums (Ultratop Wallonia)	9
Canada Top Albums/CDs (RPM)	9
Czech Albums (ČNS IFPI)	7
Danish Albums (Hitlisten)	5
Dutch Albums (Album Top 100)	22
European Albums (Music & Media)	1
Finnish Albums (Suomen virallinen lista)	22
French Albums (SNEP)	6
German Albums (Offizielle Top 100)	2
Hungarian Albums (MAHASZ)	33
Irish Albums (IRMA)	26
Italian Albums (FIMI)	5
Japanese Albums (Oricon)	62
Norwegian Albums (VG-lista)	22
Scottish Albums (Official Charts)	9
Spanish Albums (PROMUSICAE)	32
Swedish Albums (Sverigetopplistan)	5
Swiss Albums (Schweizer Hitparade)	2
UK Albums (Official Charts)	4
US Billboard 200	25

=== Year-end charts ===
Year-end chart performance for Peace
Chart (1999)	Position
Belgian Albums (Ultratop Wallonia)	77
European Albums (Music & Media)	46
German Albums (Offizielle Top 100)	67
Swedish Albums (Sverigetopplistan)	97
UK Albums (OCC)	75

== Certifications ==
Certifications for Peace
Region	Certification	Certified units/sales
Belgium (BRMA)	Gold	25,000^{*}
Canada (Music Canada)	Platinum	100,000^{^}
France (SNEP)	Gold	100,000^{*}
Germany (BVMI)	Gold	150,000^{^}
Italy (FIMI)	2× Platinum	200,000^{*}
Sweden (GLF)	Gold	40,000^{^}
Switzerland (IFPI Switzerland)	Gold	25,000^{^}
United Kingdom (BPI)	Gold	100,000^{^}
United States (RIAA)	Gold	500,000^{^}
Summaries
Europe (IFPI)	Platinum	1,000,000^{*}
^{*} Sales figures based on certification alone.^{^} Shipments figures based on certification alone.
