= Beethoven (I Love to Listen To) =

Single by Eurythmics

from the album Savage
- B-side: "Heaven" (LP Version)
- Released: 12 October 1987
- Recorded: 1987
- Studio: Chateau de Dangu (Normandy, France)
- Genre: Synth-pop
- Length: 4:40 (album version); 3:56 (single version)
- Label: RCA
- Songwriters: Annie Lennox; David A. Stewart
- Producer: David A. Stewart

Eurythmics singles chronology
"The Miracle of Love" (1986)	"Beethoven (I Love to Listen To)" (1987)	"Shame" (1987)

Music video
- "Beethoven (I Love to Listen To)" on YouTube

"Beethoven (I Love to Listen To)" is a song by British pop duo Eurythmics, released on 12 October 1987 as the lead single from their sixth studio album, Savage (1987). Written by both Lennox and Stewart, lyrically, it focuses on a woman going insane, further depicted in the accompanying music video, directed by Sophie Muller. The song was pitched to their record label, RCA Records, with the strong correlation between both the song and the music video in mind.

== Background and composition ==
It was written by group members Annie Lennox and David A. Stewart. Although not released as a single in the United States, the track appeared as a double A-side of the 12 inch single for "I Need a Man", and received heavy rotation on MTV. It was a Top 20 hit in several European territories and also in Australia. The Savage album returned Eurythmics to a more electronic sound and the "Beethoven" vocals are performed mostly as spoken-word from Lennox, with the exception of the repeated phrase "I love to" throughout the track.

Lyrically, the song portrays a woman going mad as portrayed by Lennox. David A. Stewart claimed the song was about "somebody losing their mind, a woman under the influence or that kind of feeling", later claiming that "Annie grasped that concept straightaway". Stewart composed the song primarily on a Synclavier machine, allowing him to produce the song in a manner which allowed for lines throughout the song to be repeated. The lyrics "I was dreaming like a Texan girl" and "a girl who thinks she should have something extreme" are to contradict the portrayal of a satisfied housewife in the accompanying music video.

The song was not initially the preferred choice as lead single from the album by their record label, RCA Records; however, at this stage of their career, Eurythmics had full control over which songs were to be released as singles from their albums. Stewart claimed that "imagine, I delivered this video as the first single to the record label, they [RCA Record executives] all sitting in a room, I put it on, and there's Annie going, I was dreaming like a Texas girl". Stewart imagined the response from the record label would have been along the lines of "what the hell is this?" or "she's got a wig on and knitting".

== Music video ==
Lennox as the housewife

Lennox as the vixen

Music videos were produced for all twelve tracks on the Savage album, most of which were directed by Sophie Muller, this video being her foray after previously editing the band's Marek Budzynski-directed music video for The Walk 5 years earlier), and most of them with a shared concept featuring character(s) played by Lennox who display characteristics of dissociative identity disorder or split personalities.

As the first part of this loose narrative, the "Beethoven" video begins with Lennox portraying a repressed, middle-class housewife, knitting in her apartment. She exhibits characteristics of obsessive–compulsive disorder through her habitual cleaning and chopping of vegetables. The video also includes a mischievous little girl who wears a Shirley Temple-style dress and blonde wig, and a tall, bald man who is wearing make-up and an evening gown. Neither the man or the girl are directly noticed by the housewife, even though they are in her living room with her, suggesting that they are elements of her psyche.

These characters are seemingly components of a new character that the dowdy housewife becomes as she has a nervous breakdown. Merging the little girl (wild, mischievous and attention-seeking) and the man (uninhibited sexuality that defies conventional gender roles), the housewife transforms herself into a blonde, overtly sexual vixen. In this newly liberated persona, she trashes the apartment that, as a housewife, she had kept meticulously clean. The video ends with her walking out into the street laughing.

== Critical reception ==
Upon its release as a single, Pete Paisley of Record Mirror described it as "the strangest Lennox/Stewart song to date" and "totally loop-di-loop". He added, "Annie assumes a variety of singing voices over a typically brisk production from chum Dave. Impossible to tell what's going on. But let's just hope they make enough dosh from it never to have to do it again." Jerry Smith of Music Week praised it as a "striking track" with its "spoken verses and curiously catchy chorus".

== Track listings ==
- 7-inch single (UK, GER, FR, SP, AUS)
1. "Beethoven (I Love To Listen To)" (7" Edit) – 3:59
2. "Heaven" (LP Version) – 3:24
- 12-inch (UK, GER, FR, SP, AUS)
1. "Beethoven (I Love To Listen To)" (Dance Mix) – 5:18
2. "Heaven" (LP Version) – 3:24
3. "Beethoven (I Love To Listen To)" (LP Version) – 4:48 *
- CD single (UK, GER)
1. "Beethoven (I Love To Listen To)" (7" Edit) – 3:59
2. "Heaven" (LP Version) – 3:24
3. "Beethoven (I Love To Listen To)" (Dance Mix) – 5:18
- CD single (JP)
1. "Beethoven (I Love To Listen To)" (7" Edit) – 3:59
2. "Heaven" (LP Version) – 3:24
- this version although labelled as "extended" on the single cover is actually the LP version.

== Charts ==
=== Weekly charts ===
Chart (1987–1988)	Peak position
Australia (Australian Music Report)	13
Belgium (Ultratop 50 Flanders)	28
Europe (European Hot 100 Singles)	15
Finland (Suomen virallinen lista)	5
Ireland (IRMA)	11
Italy (Musica e dischi)	8
Italy Airplay (Music & Media)	4
Netherlands (Dutch Top 40 Tipparade)	10
Netherlands (Single Top 100)	41
New Zealand (Recorded Music NZ)	6
Norway (VG-lista)	6
South Africa (Springbok Radio)	23
Spain (AFYVE)	18
Sweden (Sverigetopplistan)	9
Switzerland (Schweizer Hitparade)	19
UK Singles (Official Charts)	25
US Dance Club Songs (Billboard) with "I Need a Man"	6
US Dance Singles Sales (Billboard) with "I Need a Man"	13
West Germany (GfK)	28
