= List of Esperanto-language writers =

Authors from many nations (see also eo.wikipedia page) have written original literature in the Esperanto language, a constructed international auxiliary language with an estimated two million speakers worldwide.

== Alphabetical list of notable authors ==
=== A ===
- Hendrik Adamson (1891–1946), Estonian poet
- Teresa de Almeida (1932– ), poet
- Nadija Hordijenko Andrianova (1928–1991), writer
- William Auld

=== B ===
- Julio Baghy, novelist
- Johán Balano
- Gerrit Berveling
- Marjorie Boulton
- Hendrik Bulthuis

=== C ===
- Jorge Camacho

=== D ===
- Vimala Devi (Teresa de Almeida)
- Frans van Dooren
- Deck Dorval

=== F ===
- Jean Forge
- Edmund Edward Fournier d'Albe
- Jan Filip

=== G ===
- Antoni Grabowski
- Petr Ginz

=== H ===
- Marie Hankel

=== I ===
- Saburo Ito
- Vsevolod Ivanov

=== K ===
- Kálmán Kalocsay
- Lena Karpunina

=== L ===
- Georges Lagrange
- Jonathan Leunbach
- Anna Löwenstein

=== M ===
- Abel Montagut

=== N ===
- Ivan Naumov
- István Nemere

=== P ===
- Edward Saxton Payson (1842–1932)
- Peter Peneter, poet
- Claude Piron
- Edmond Privat
- Frederic Pujulà i Vallès

=== R ===
- Baldur Ragnarsson
- Johan Hammond Rosbach
- Cezaro Rossetti
- Reto Rossetti
- Josef Rumler, translator

=== S ===
- Victor Sadler
- Hermann Schmid (Esperantist)
- Raymond Schwartz
- Manuel de Seabra
- Tibor Sekelj
- Jan Stanisław Skorupski
- Trevor Steele
- Sándor Szathmári

=== T ===
- Éva Tófalvi
- Julian Tuwim

=== V ===
- Johán Valano
- Vladimir Varankin

=== W ===
- Gaston Waringhien
- Eugen Wüster
- Jenny Weleminsky (1882–1957)

=== Z ===
- Ludoviko Zamenhof
- Lidia Zamenhof
