= Esperanto literature =

Works in international auxiliary language

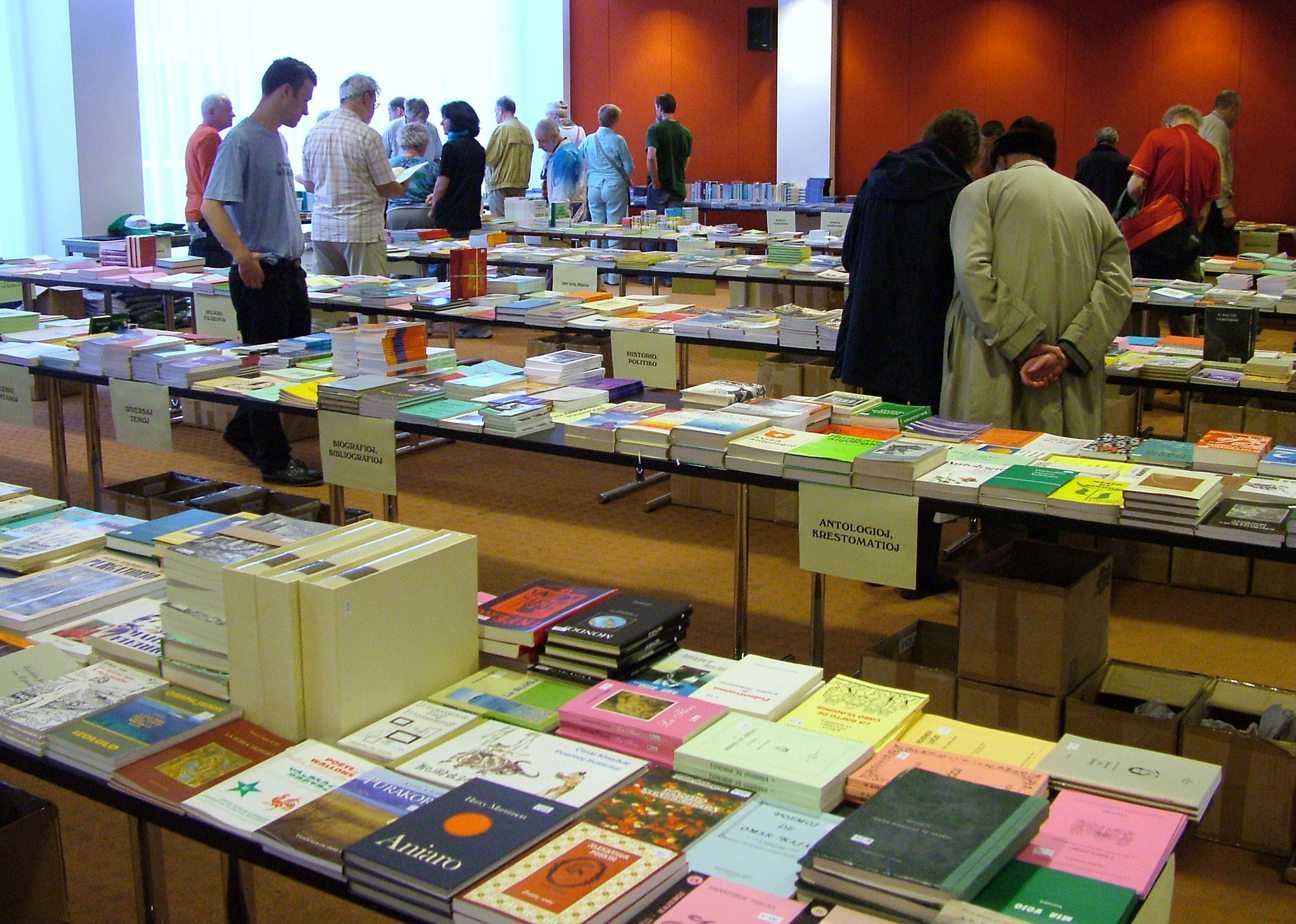
Esperanto books at the World Esperanto Congress, Rotterdam 2008

Literature in the Esperanto language began before the first official publication in Esperanto in 1887: the language's creator, L. L. Zamenhof, translated poetry and prose into the language as he was developing it as a test of its completeness and expressiveness, and published several translations and a short original poem as an appendix to the first book on the language, Unua Libro. Other early speakers wrote poetry, stories, and essays in the language; Henri Vallienne was the first to write novels in Esperanto. The first female Esperanto novelist was Edith Alleyne Sinnotte with her book Lilio published in 1918. Except for a handful of poems, most of the literature from Esperanto's first two decades is now regarded as of historical interest only.

Between the two World Wars, several new poets and novelists published their first works, including several recognized as the first to produce work of outstanding quality in the still-young language: Julio Baghy, Eŭgeno Miĥalski, Kálmán Kalocsay, Heinrich Luyken, and Jean Forge.

Modern authors include Claude Piron and William Auld, who was nominated for the Nobel Prize in Literature, Sten Johansson, Trevor Steele, Miguel Fernández, Julia Sigmund, Sen Rodin, Eugène de Zilah, Liven Dek, Manuel de Seabra, Baldur Ragnarsson, Jorge Camacho, Victor Sadler, Edwin de Kock, Mao Zifu, Benoît Philippe and others.

Esperanto has seen a solid production of material in braille since the work of the blind Russian Esperantist Vasili Eroshenko, who wrote and taught in Japan and China in the 1910s and 1920s, and Harold Brown wrote several modern plays in Esperanto.

The largest Esperanto book service at the Universal Esperanto Association offers around 4,000 books in its catalog. About 130 novels have been published originally in Esperanto. Two major literary magazines: Literatura Foiro, and Beletra Almanako, are published regularly; some other magazines, such as Monato, also publish fiction.

The most comprehensive guide to the literature of the language is Geoffrey Sutton's Concise Encyclopedia of the Original Literature of Esperanto, published under the auspices of the Esperanto-speaking Writers' Association by Mondial.

== Notable writers ==
Some of the major figures of Esperanto literature:

- Edith Alleyne Sinnotte
- Marjorie Boulton
- William Auld
- Julio Baghy
- Kazimierz Bein (translations)
- Jorge Camacho
- Vasili Eroshenko
- Antoni Grabowski (mainly translations)
- Sten Johansson
- Kálmán Kalocsay
- Nikolai Vladimirovich Nekrasov
- Mauro Nervi
- Claude Piron
- Frederic Pujulà i Vallès
- Baldur Ragnarsson
- Raymond Schwartz
- Trevor Steele
- Vladimir Varankin

== See also ==
- Esperanto culture
- List of Esperanto speakers
- Esperanto in popular culture
- List of Esperanto periodicals
- Bible translations into Esperanto
- Esperanto Museum and Collection of Planned Languages in Austria
- Interlingue literature
