= Petro Palyvoda =

Ukrainian poet

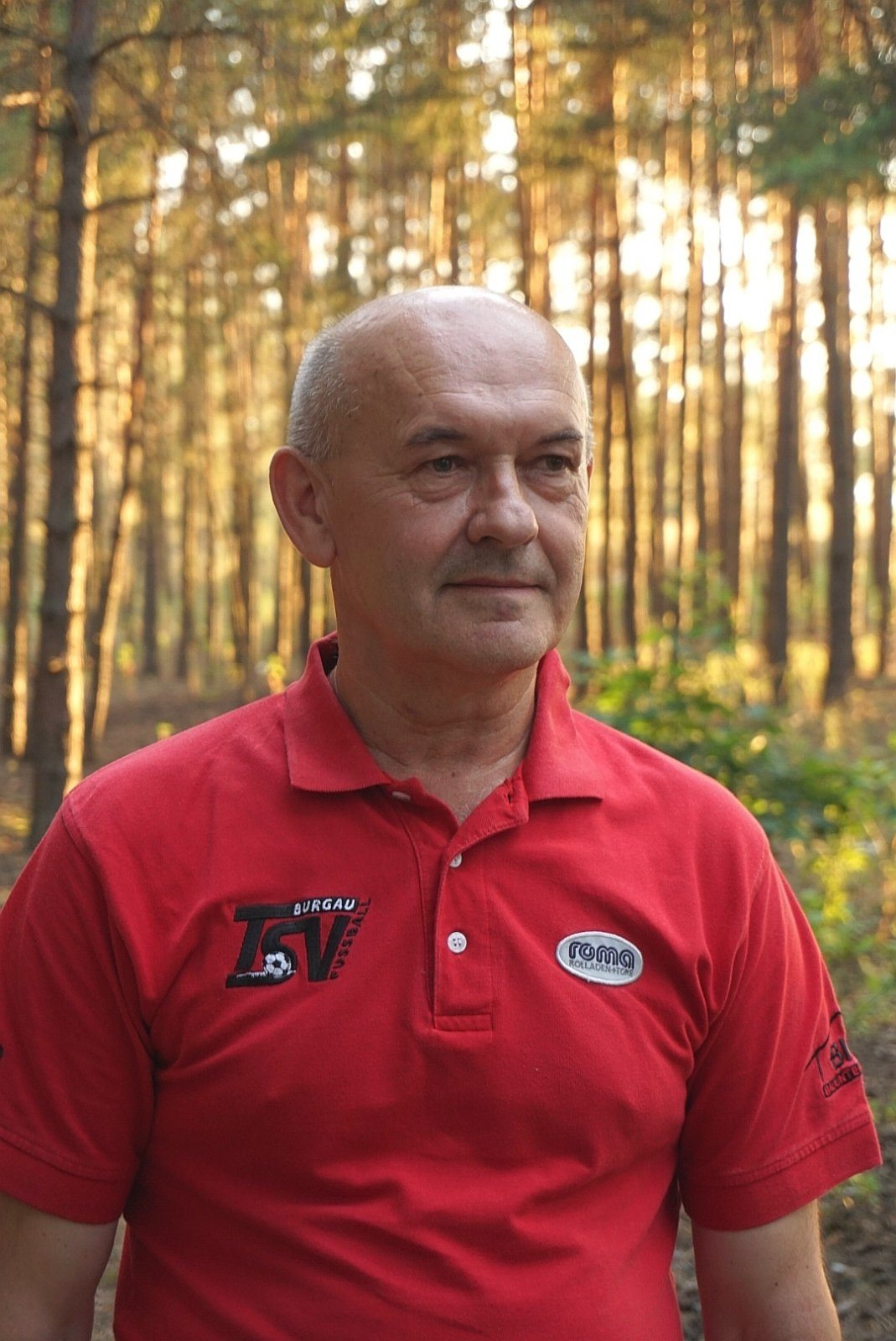
- Born: 1959 (age 66–67); Volyn
- Citizenship: Ukrainian
- Occupations: Poet, translator

Petro Palyvoda (born 1959) is a Ukrainian poet and translator from Volyn. Writing in both Ukrainian and Esperanto languages, he lives in the Kyiv Oblast. His works have been translated into a number of languages.

== Languages ==
At different times, his works have been written in different languages: Ukrainian, Esperanto, Russian, German, and translations from German, Spanish, Esperanto, Polish, Flemish, and Russian into Ukrainian and from Ukrainian to Esperanto, were published in newspapers, magazines, almanacs, and anthologies in Ukraine, Russia, Lithuania, Czech Republic, Slovakia, Switzerland, Romania, the US, Australia, China, Costa Rica, Poland, Canada, Turkey, Croatia, Korea, Hungary, Israel, France, Japan, Brazil, Sweden and Malagasy Republic.

He has translated poetry from Ukrainian into Esperanto of poets including:

- Lesia Ukrainka
- Oleksandr Oles
- Andrii Malyshko
- Oleksa Slisarenko
- Vasyl Atamaniuk
- Stepan Charnetskyi
- Mykhailo Drai-Khmara
- Vasyl Symonenko
- Dmytro Lutsenko
- Volodymyr Dankevych
- Larysa Mandziuk
- Diana Holde
- Yuriy Rybchynskyi
- Bohdana Yehorova
- Mariia Mykytsei
- Daryna Shevchuk
- Liubov Serdunych
- Pavlo Vyshebaba
- Maksym Kryvtsov
- Yaryna Chornohuz
- Artur Dron
- Vasyl Vyshyvanyi
- Valerii Puzik
- Oksana Zabuzhko
- Viktoriia Amelina
- Ukrainian folk songs

In addition, he has translated poetry from Esperanto into Ukrainian of poets including:

- William Auld
- Albert Goodheir
- Baldur Ragnarsson
- Mauro Nervi
- L. L. Zamenhof
- Hilda Dresen
- Victor Sadler
- Vasili Eroshenko
- Alexander Logvin
- Eugeniusz Matkowski
- Aivar Liepins
- Julia Sigmond
- Zhomart Amzyeyev
- Julio Baghy
- Benoît Philippe
- Julián Marchena (from Spanish to Ukrainian)
- Guido Gezelle (from Flemish into Ukrainian)
- Elzbieta Wodala (from Polish into Ukrainian)
- Martin Kirchhoff (from German into Ukrainian)
- Tetiana Chernetska (from Russian into Ukrainian)

And translated of:

- Kalle Kniivilä (from Esperanto into Ukrainian and Russian)
- Ulrich Becker (from Esperanto into Ukrainian)
- Guido Hernández Marin (from Esperanto into Ukrainian)
- Les (Oleksandr) Denysiuk (from Esperanto into Ukrainian)
- Andrii Chaikovskyi (from Esperanto into Ukrainian)
- Anton Meiser (from German into Ukrainian)
- Manfred Welzel (from German into Ukrainian)
- Khrystyna Kozlovska (from Ukrainian into Esperanto and German)
- Bohdana Yehorova (from Ukrainian into Esperanto and German)
- Pavlo Vyshebaba (from Ukrainian into Esperanto)

== Awards ==
Winner of:

- the 2025 World Esperanto Association's Beletraj Konkursoj literary contest in the category "Song Lyrics" (1st and 2nd place)
- the international literary contest in Esperanto (poetry) "Liro-1982" Kaliningrad, Russia (3rd prize)
- the international literary contest in Esperanto (poetry) "EKRA-2006", Razgrad, Bulgaria (1st prize)
- Ukrainian literary contest "Rukomeslo 2006", Kyiv (poetry - 3rd prize, translation - 2nd prize)
- winner of the XVII Ukrainian festival of Ukrainian modern pop songs "Song Vernissage-2006" (the author of the laureate lyrics)
- winner of the All-Ukrainian literary and musical contest "Inspiro" in the branches of "Original poetry" and "Translated poetry" (Kolomyia, 2015)
- winner of the International poetry contest "Una ballata per l'Esperanto" (Messina, Italy, 2019)
- winner of the international translation contest (poetry) "Lucija Borčić", Croatia, 2020 (3rd prize)
- winner of the international musical contest "Ĝanfranko", Italy, 2021 (1st and 2nd prizes), 2026 (1st prize), with singer Yurii Krombet
- a winner (in co-authorship) of the All-Ukrainian literary competition "Mein Erinnerungsort" ("Place of my memory") of the German-Ukrainian cultural and educational center "Nürnberger Haus" in 2021 (special prize).

Palyvoda's literary works have been translated to German, Croatian, Italian, Korean, and French.

From 2004 to 2012, he was a member of the jury of the international competition of literary works and translations in Esperanto "Liro".

Palyvoda is the author of the poetry books "Against Time" (in Ukrainian"), Lutsk, Vezha-Druk, 2021, and "Pendolo" (in Esperanto and Korean translated by Jang Jeong Yeol (Ombro), Seoul, South Korea, Azalea, 2023. He is a translator and the redactor of the book "Pli leĝera ol aero" by Khrystyna Kozlovska in Esperanto published by Mondial (New-York, USA).

== Music ==
Palyvoda is a songwriter. His poems have been set to music by composers, including:

- Valerii Tytarenko
- Leonid Popernatskyi
- Ivan Pustovyi
- Yurii Krombet
- Volodymyr Siryi
- Dmytro Zubko
- Hennadii Volodko
- Viktor Okhrimchuk
- Vlad Bulakh
- Biagio Ilacqua (Italy)
- JoMo (Jean-Marc Leclercq) (France)
- Antero Avila (Portugal)
- Feri Floro (Germany)
- Liven Dek (Spain) (Spain)
- Christian Departe (France)

His songs have been performed by Ukrainian singers and bands, including:

- Yurii Rozhkov
- Pavlo Mrezhuk
- Markiian Sviato
- Yurii Krombet
- Ivan Pustovyi
- Volodymyr Siryi
- Dmytro Kostrov
- Serhii Nykonenko
- Serhii Rozumnyi
- Oleksandr Drahomoshchenko
- Olena Myshliakovska
- Natalia Kaskova
- Star Dream
- Stefaniia Okseniuk
- Vlad Bulakh
- Ĵomart kaj Nataŝa (Sweden)
- Romilda Mangraviti (Italy)
- JoMo (France)
- Alta Tajdo (Portugal)
- Grinoalda and Maria Avila (Portugal)
- Feri Floro (Germany)
- Amira Chun (Korea)
- MoKo (France)

Author of the anthem of the Pirnivska territorial community, Vyshhorod district, Kyiv region (music by Yurii Krombet)
