= Gerda malaperis! =

1983 novella by Claude Piron

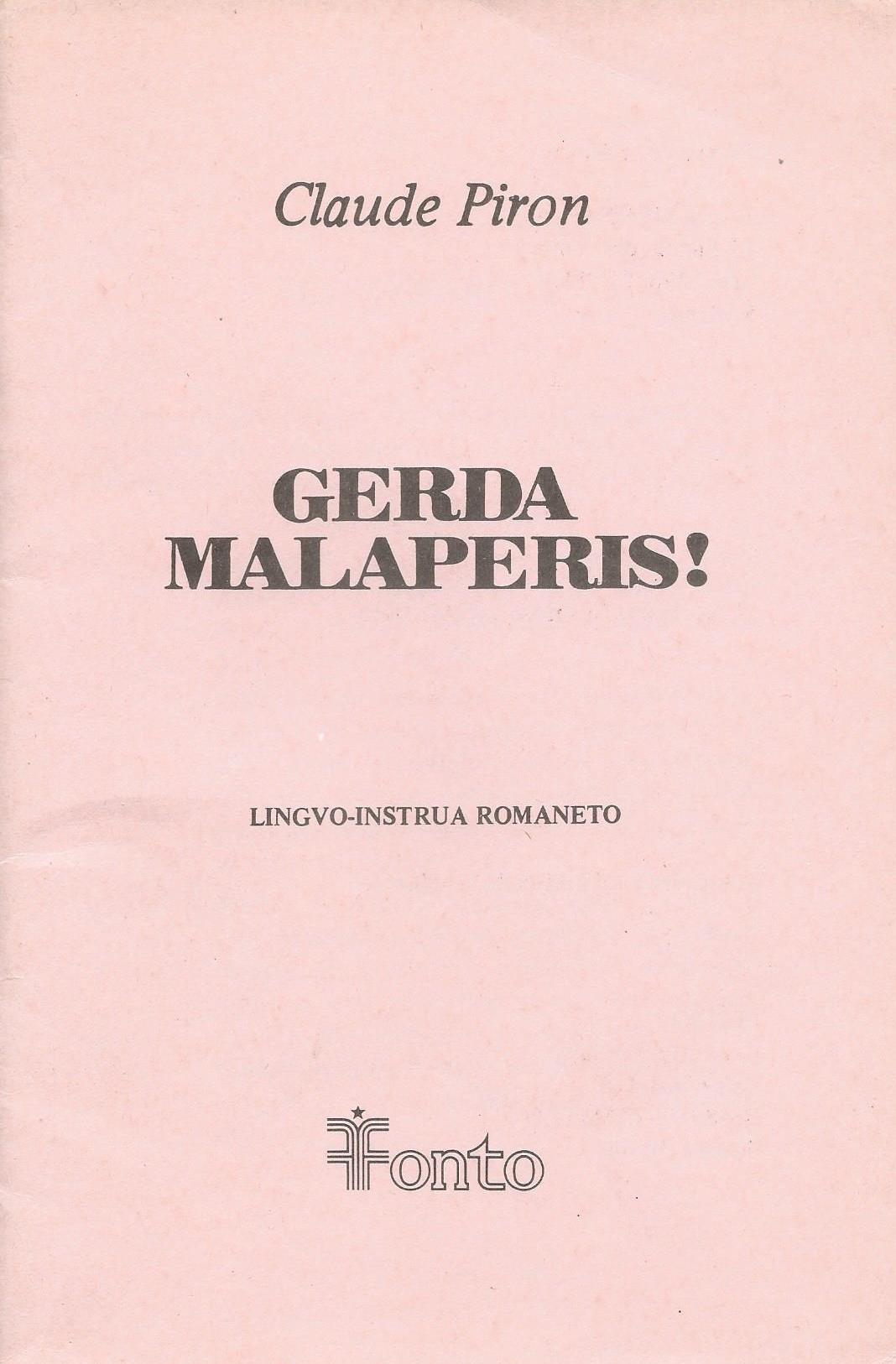
- Cover of 1987 edition
- Author: Claude Piron
- Language: Esperanto
- Genre: Adventure fiction
- Publisher: Fonto
- Publication date: 1983
- Publication place: Brazil
- Pages: 48

Gerda malaperis! (Esperanto pronunciation: [ˈɡerda malaˈperis]; transl. Gerda Has Disappeared!) is a 1983 Esperanto-language novella by Claude Piron. The novella is regularly used in language instruction.

== See also ==
- Esperanto literature
