= Abel Montagut =

Catalan translator

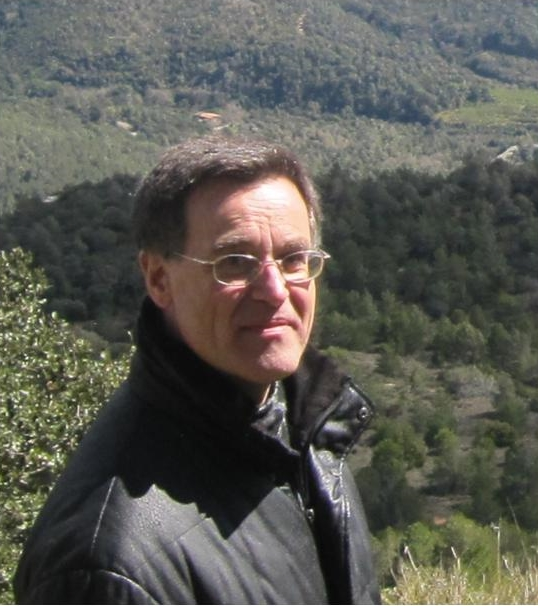
- Born: Jesús Abel Montagut i Masip; 1953 (age 72–73); Llardecans, Catalonia, Spain
- Occupations: Translator and writer
- Writing career
- Language: Catalan

Jesús Abel Montagut i Masip (Catalan pronunciation: [ʒəˈzuz əˈβɛl muntəˈɣut i məˈsip]; born 1953 in Llardecans (Catalonia, Spain), commonly known as Abel Montagut, is a Catalan translator and author of both Catalan and Esperanto. Concise Encyclopedia of the Original Literature of Esperanto (2008:553) informs us that Montagut studied Romance Philology and also learnt Esperanto. He taught Catalan language and literature as a secondary-school teacher alongside writing in Catalan and in Esperanto. His works have “appeared in the periodicals Esperanto, Literatura Foiro, Fonto, La Gazeto, Kataluna Esperantisto and others [and] he has twice been honored for his stories in Catalan literary competitions.” In 1993 he published Poemo de Utnoa (The Epic of Utnoa), an epic inspired by various works including: Epic of Gilgamesh, Ramayana, The Bible, Iliad, The Odyssey, Aeneid, etc. According to the Concise Encyclopedia of the Original Literature of Esperanto “Montagut’s epic Poemo de Utnoa [Utnoa’s Poem], consisting of seven cantos in over 7,000 lines, was called by William Auld (q.v.): “The first truly remarcable epic science-fiction poem in the world, and one of the very few modern epics.”

== Works ==
=== Esperanto ===
==== Originals ====
- Poemo de Utnoa. Pro Esperanto. (1993, 255 p.), ISBN 3-85182-007-X.
- Karnavale (maskita rakonto), Esperanto version of Carnestoltes (novel·la disfressada) i altres relats. IEM. (1997, 65 p.)
- La enigmo de l' ar@neo, Esperanto version of L'enigma de l'arany@. IEM. (2003, 279 p.)

==== Translations ====
- "Amkantoj. 60 poemoj" translated from "Cants d'amor. 60 poemes" by Ausiàs March, Ed. Generalitat Valenciana, Conselleria de Cultura, Educació i Ciència, València, 1993, ISBN 84-482-0230-9

=== Catalan ===
- La gesta d'Utnoa, Catalan version of Poemo de Utnoa. Pagès Editors. (1996, 215 p.), ISBN 84-7935-384-8
- L'enigma de l'arany@. Pagès Editors. (2000, 346 p.)
- Carnestoltes (novel·la disfressada) i altres relats, Catalan version of Karnavale (maskita rakonto). Llibres de l'Índex. (2003, 86 p.)
- El manuscrit de Jules Verne. Editorial Barcanova. (2003, 110 p.)
- ‘La contribució de la llengua internacional esperanto a la supervivència de la diversitat lingüística’ pdf 1; pdf 2, Congrés Linguapax X, Barcelona, 2004.

=== Spanish ===
- Utnoa. Poema épico, translation of Poemo de Utnoa, La biblioteca del laberinto, Miraflores de la Sierra (Madrid), 2018, 255 p., ISBN 978-84-948-234-3-5.
- Tierranegra. El último viaje extraordinario, rewriting, originally in French, of Jules Verne's latest novel (Voyage d'études by Jules Verne, and La mission Barsac by Jules Verne's son, Michel Verne). Sociedad Hispánica Jules Verne, Editorial Paganel, 2016, 218 p. ISBN 978-84-608-6693-0,

== See also ==
- The Epic of Utnoa
- William Auld
- Kálmán Kalocsay
- Marjorie Boulton
- Georges Lagrange
- Victor Sadler
- Gerrit Berveling

== Bibliography ==
- CAPPA, Giulio (ed.). La lingua fantastica, Keltia Editrice, Aosta, Italy, 1994, p. 265-275; ISBN 8886692072.
- MARTÍN RODRÍGUEZ, Mariano. «Dioses extraterrestres en la nueva epopeya. "La gesta d'Utnoa", de Abel Montagut, y la remitificación paeloastronáutica de Noé». [Alien gods in the new epics: Noah remythologised through the ancient astronaut hypothesis in Abel's Montagut's "La gesta d'Utnoa"] Amaltea: revista de mitocrítica 7, October 2015, p. 57-86. https://doi.org/10.5209/rev_AMAL.2015.v7.47672
- PUIG, Eloi. “La Gesta d’Utnoa”. La Biblioteca del Kraken, n.p., 9 May 2008. https://www.elkraken.com/Esp/G-esp/R-Gesta-Utnoa-esp.html
- SUTTON, Geoffrey. “Montagut (i Masip), (Jesús) Abel (b. 1953)” in Concise Encyclopedia of the Original Literature of Esperanto, 1887–2007. New York: Mondial, 2008, p. 553-557. ISBN 978-1-59569-090-6.
- TONKIN, H. (2012). “Esperanto Poetry”. The Princeton Encyclopedia of Poetry and Poetics. Eds. Roland Green et alii. Princeton, NJ: Princeton University Press. 457–58.
- XI Festival de poesia de la Mediterrània. Teatre Principal de Palma, Ed. Produccions Estelroig (Sant Joan – Mallorca), 2009, p. 183-209, DL: PM 1.303-2009. https://docplayer.es/133659531-Xxi-festival-de-poesia-de-la-mediterrania.html
