= The Epic of Utnoa =

The Epic of Utnoa (Esperanto: Poemo de Utnoa) is an epic by the Catalan writer Abel Montagut, published in Vienna, Austria, in 1993 and originally written in Esperanto. It consists of seven cantos, and of 7095 verses in all, in an Alexandrine-derived metre, a variant featuring 15 syllables rather than the usual 14. The songs are inspired by major epics from world literature such as the Epic of Gilgamesh, the Aeneid, the Bible, the Ramayana, the Iliad, and by modern authors such as Papini, Asimov, and others – especially as far as the treatment of the primaeval flood is concerned. The book is contextualized by a foreword (by William Auld) and an afterword by Probal Dasgupta. William Auld called Poemo de Utnoa “the first truly remarkable epic-science fiction poem in the world, and one of the very few modern epics” and Gerrit Berveling called it “impressively beautiful -- and at its most profound very wise – epic”

== Plot ==
The story is narrated by the Gobans, an extraterrestrial population that visits Earth and studies the behavior of "Terrans." The extraterrestrials inquire whether the Terrans deserve to be helped to avoid an impending disaster or whether it is better for the extraterrestrials to wait for the destruction to happen in order to be able to colonize the planet for their own use. They conclude that they must warn at least one Terran that he should build a large ship to survive the flood: the extraterrestrial Emme conveys this warning to Utnoa, a character corresponding to the mythical figure Noah.

Utnoa and his brother Lashmu visit a Babylonian oracle to ask what the message communicated to Utnoa means. Meanwhile, the temple guards attached to the Ishtar Temple in Babylon launch a violent attack against the nomadic Dilmunites. When Utnoa tells his people they need to build a ship, very few of them agree to do the work. Most of them go off to fight the city-dwellers. Utnoa's followers have begun to build the ship, with support from Shabda, queen of Ur, but in the face of opposition from the humiliated general Ulmi.

Arunni feeds the prophetess Filge with thoughts against those building the ship. A deserter, Tudar, comes from the city to the shipbuilders and tells them that the queen is dead and that there will be a major offensive against the Dilmunites very soon. Even before he finishes telling them the whole story, General Ulmi, seeking revenge, launches the attack. Most of the shipbuilders are massacred.

In order to compensate for the hostile action by Arunni, the Gobans give Utnoa a drug called anoŭdo. Under the influence of the drug, he sees the poet Valmiki, who shows him the enormous achievements humankind will perform in future if he is able to save it. Utnoa contemplates the remarkable accomplishments which would render meaningful his heroic effort. On his return, Utnoa leads the ceremonial mourning of his brother Lashmu, who had been supervising the shipbuilding work. Despite his drug-induced insights, Utoa abandons the project, burns the partially built ship, and withdraws into the wilderness with a few Dilmunite survivors. Another small group of Dilmunites arrives with the news that the situation back home has worsened and they would like to help Utnoa build his ship after all.

The Dilmunites put their life back together as best they can. Utnoa gets engaged and marries; they receive what they take to be divine signals, which prompt them to start building the ship at the city of Eridu. The extraterrestrial Gobans react again: Jishka administers a drug to Utnoa, whose visions this time show future evils that will come to pass if he does indeed rescue humankind. After he comes out of the dream, Utnoa forgets the vision. The closing lines of the epic are open-ended. The impression is given that the ship will indeed be built.

== Bibliography ==
- CAPPA, Giulio (ed.). La lingua fantastica, Keltia Editrice, Aosta, Italy, 1994, p. 265-275; ISBN 8886692072.
- Martín Rodríguez, Mariano (24 September 2015). "Dioses extraterrestres en la nueva epopeya: "La gesto d' Utnoa", de Abel Montagut, y la remitificación paeloastronáutica de Noé". Amaltea. Revista de mitocrítica. 7. doi:10.5209/rev_AMAL.2015.v7.47672.
- McHale, Brian (2009). "Beginning to Think about Narrative in Poetry". Narrative. 17 (1): 11–27. doi:10.1353/nar.0.0014. S2CID 49383612. Project MUSE 256469.
- PUIG, Eloi. “La Gesta d’Utnoa”. La Biblioteca del Kraken, n.p., 9 May 2008. https://www.elkraken.com/Esp/G-esp/R-Gesta-Utnoa-esp.html
- SUTTON, Geoffrey. Concise Encyclopedia of the Original Literature of Esperanto, 1887–2007. New York: Mondial, 2008, p. 553-557. ISBN 978-1-59569-090-6.
- TONKIN, H. (2012). “Esperanto Poetry”. The Princeton Encyclopedia of Poetry and Poetics. Eds. Roland Green et alii. Princeton, NJ: Princeton University Press. 457–58.
- VIANA, Paulo S. Poemo de Utnoa, Grava, sed ne sufiĉe legata [‘Important, but hasn’t found enough readers’], Esperanto, no. 1298, January 2016, p. 13.
- XI Festival de poesia de la Mediterrània. Teatre Principal de Palma, Ed. Produccions Estelroig (Sant Joan – Mallorca), 2009, p. 183-209, DL: PM 1.303-2009. https://docplayer.es/133659531-Xxi-festival-de-poesia-de-la-mediterrania.html
