= Skorupski =

Skorupski (feminine Skorupska) is a Polish surname. Notable people include:

- Jan Stanisław Skorupski (born 1938), Polish essayist
- John Skorupski (born 1946), British philosopher
- Krzysztof Skorupski (born 1989), Polish rallycross driver
- Łukasz Skorupski (born 1991), Polish footballer
- Ute Skorupski (born 1959), East German rower
- Nina Skorupska (born 1961), British engineer
- Melita Skorupski (1942–2002), Croatian ballet dancer and choreographer
