= Norvega Esperantista Ligo =

Norwegian arm of the Esperanto movement

Norvega Esperantista Ligo (Norsk Esperanto-Forbund, Norwegian Esperanto League) was founded in 1911. As the Norwegian arm of the Esperanto movement, its aim is to spread knowledge and use of the international language Esperanto. The league has a modest size of a couple of hundred members, and work done within NEL is mostly voluntary. The youth wing of NEL is Norvega Junularo Esperantista.

Affiliated with the largest international Esperanto organization, the Universala Esperanto-Asocio (UEA), the association has a permanent office in Oslo (also used by the Esperanto club of Oslo) and local subgroups scattered around the country. The Grupo Esperantista de Trondheim (Norwegian: Trondheim Esperantoklubb), for example, celebrated its centennial on June 16, 2007.

Since 1985 the NEL has published a magazine, Norvega Esperantisto (six issues per year).

== Norwegian Esperanto history ==
=== Early history to 1911 ===
The Norwegian Esperanto League was founded January 27, 1911 after earlier groundwork had been laid some years earlier by Haldor Midthus (1841-1906), Norway's first Esperantist. In 1886 Midthus, a teacher from Os Municipality in Hordaland, had learned Volapük, another constructed language. Having been active in the Volapük movement for ten years, he came to prefer Esperanto and became an enthusiastic proponent for Esperanto as the ideal international language. Midthus attended the first World Esperanto Congress in 1905 a few months before his death.

In 1906 the first Esperanto club in Kristiania (now Oslo) was established. The first members were students and temperance activists. The International Order of Good Templars, an organization devoted to ending the consumption of alcohol, had established lodges in Scandinavia beginning in 1877. The Swedish parliamentarian Edvard Wavrinski, the international president of the IOGT, wrote a series of articles on Esperanto for the IOGT publication Goodtemplarbladet, and several leading members of the alcohol-abstention movement showed interest.

In 1907 the German chemist Wilhelm Ostwald (who was later to win the Nobel Prize) visited the Royal Frederick University (now the University of Oslo). He lectured on Esperanto, which brought many new members to Kristiania's Esperanto club.

In the following years several new clubs were founded in Trondheim (1907), Narvik (1907), Bergen (1909) and Stavanger (1910). The club began in 1909 the publication of the journal Esperanto-bladet, and some members began to think of a national organization of Esperantists.

=== Between the wars ===
After the founding of the NEL, Norwegian Esperantists began a comprehensive program of language promotion and instruction. One of the early results (1912) was that Esperanto become an elective course at a business school (handelsskole) in Bergen. Esperanto activities broke off during World War I but were revived again in the mid-1920s. By the 1930s the Norwegian Esperanto League had grown to a membership of several thousand, with activities throughout Norway and with many participants in Esperanto courses.

=== World War II ===
In 1936 Esperanto had been prohibited in Nazi Germany. After the Nazi occupation of Norway beginning on April 9, 1940, the Norwegian parliament met in emergency session at Elverum and unanimously voted to delegate all legislative authority to King Haakon VII and the elected cabinet. With this legitimized government in exile in England, the occupying Nazis vested de facto power in Reichskommissar Josef Terboven and in the puppet government of Vidkun Quisling.

Persecuted Esperantists was forced underground but nevertheless continued with private meetings and study circles. In Vestlandet, in fact, the Norwegian Esperanto League successfully arranged a clandestine meeting in 1942 for 70 NEL delegates.

Certain German soldiers who knew Esperanto sometimes tried to make contact with the underground group but were politely turned away because of the war situation and the danger that Esperantists faced if exposed. In 1942, however, a deserting German Kriegsmarine sailor who spoke Esperanto knocked on the door of the Bergen Esperanto club seeking assistance in fleeing to Sweden. The Bergen club helped him, and he later became a member of the Swedish Esperanto Federation.

=== Postwar developments in Norway ===
After the war Esperanto flowered again in Norway, and the NEL emerged a relatively strong organization. Esperanto was accepted as a subject for college study. In 1952 the 37th World Esperanto Congress, held in Oslo's newly completed city hall, attracted 1,600 delegates. King Haakon VII met the non-Norwegian delegates as they arrived at the Østbane railway station. The king jokingly remarked that the Esperantists were easy to get along with, but it was impossible to understand what they were saying. The 76th Congress, held in Bergen in 1991, drew 2,400 delegates.

In November 2006, Norwegian Esperantists arranged a conference call by telephone among delegates in Oslo, Bergen, Stavanger, Trondheim and Korgen (Hemnes Municipality); the teleconference attendees heard a talk on Esperanto history in Norway delivered by Elna Matland.

Today the NEL has active branches in Bergen, Bryne, Hamar, Kristiansand, Oslo, Sarpsborg, Stavanger, Tromsø and Trondheim. The current president of the NEL is Jardar Eggesbø Abrahamsen. At the same time as the organization continues to publish Norvega Esperantisto, the NEL, along with other Esperantist groups, is making more and more information available on the Internet.

== Esperanto dictionaries ==
In the 1930s Ragnvald Rian had edited the first Norwegian-Esperanto dictionary. With the collaboration of Erling Anker Haugen, a second edition was published in 1963. As many Esperantists in Norway now complain that this book is old, lacks many ordinary words and has an old-fashioned character that may tend to put Esperanto in a bad light, the Norwegian Esperanto League has made its top priority the publication of a new dictionary. They have delegated the task to an editorial committee from the Grupo Esperantista de Trondheim (GET) consisting of Herman Ranes, Jardar Eggesbø Abrahamsen and Kjell Heggvold Ullestad.

=== Erling Anker Haugen's notes ===
When the 1963 book was published, two copies were bound with extra blank pages sewn between the leaves of the book. The idea had been to complete the books with new words and expressions that could not be found in the printed pages. The notations were to eventually find a new home in a future, revised edition.

The younger of the 1963 edition authors, Erling Haugen, began even before the dictionary was published to collect words and expressions from Esperanto journals and other literature. Those not already in the dictionary were carefully recorded on the blank pages in the specially bound copies. Haugen continued with this labour until his death.

Haugen planned these notations as the basis of an eventual revision of the Esperanto dictionary. Because he planned to make the revision himself, he only noted words and idioms he observed in actual use. He did not evaluate them for inclusion in the printed dictionary, a task he postponed till it was time for a new edition. After some time, however, he realized he would not live to see a new edition.

Towards the end of his life he was encouraged to see young people joining the greybeards of the GET, the Trondheim Esperanto club. He proclaimed jovially, "You have much to learn when it comes to Esperanto." He donated all his notes to GET, with a plea to handle the materials carefully, as he had not been able to evaluate the quality of the collection he had amassed, a task he left for new generations. On his death in 1989, the tireless lexicographer Erling Haugen left the GET his materials containing over 20,000 words not found in the earlier 1963 dictionary.

=== Computerized database ===
Already in the time of Erling Anker Haugen, Ulf Lunde had contemplated organizing the word corpus into a database. The Trondheim Esperanto club (GET) had sought funds from the Rolf Uhlen legacy and received a grant of 35,000 kroner to help purchase a computer and to make a usable computer program for entering the data, beginning with the previously typeset book. Haugen's handwritten notations would be clarified and transcribed later, which later proved easier said than done.

The work was slow, and the editorial committee saw no end to their task. One of the Esperanto students in Trondheim, Agnar Tore Vaaje, took an interest in the old notes and was also interested in finding a practical technical solution. Together with Nils Utne and Ulf Lunde, he set to work. Vaaje learned Esperanto as he deciphered Haugen's handwriting, entered records and kept the computer running. Despite eventually becoming fluent in Esperanto, he did not have sufficient knowledge of Esperanto to revise the materials further. Here the elderly, experienced Nils Utne came into the picture. He systematized the materials, and devised workable technical solutions for ordering the great data corpus to generate a dictionary. It was a major endeavour he devoted years of life to, but did not accomplish, before he died in 1999.

After the death of Utne, the GET tried in several ways to revive the dictionary project. Because carrying out the work required a person possessing both technical knowledge of work methods and subject knowledge in lexicography, it was difficult to proceed efficiently. Those with such expertise had other obligations that demanded most of their time and work capacity. Still, the club had chosen a dictionary committee that was committed to push the project forward. In order that the work would not stagnate, they began proofreading at club meetings and on their days off from work. This attracted many participants for several years, but the corpus was huge, and the feeling of inadequacy had slowed the work when Kjell Heggvold Ullestad came into the picture.

== Norwegian Esperantists ==
- Jardar Eggesbø Abrahamsen
- Erling Anker Haugen
- Torstein Kvakland
- Elna Matland
- Haldor Midthus
- Johan Hammond Rosbach
- Ragnvald Rian
- Tron Øgrim
