= Language Problems and Language Planning =

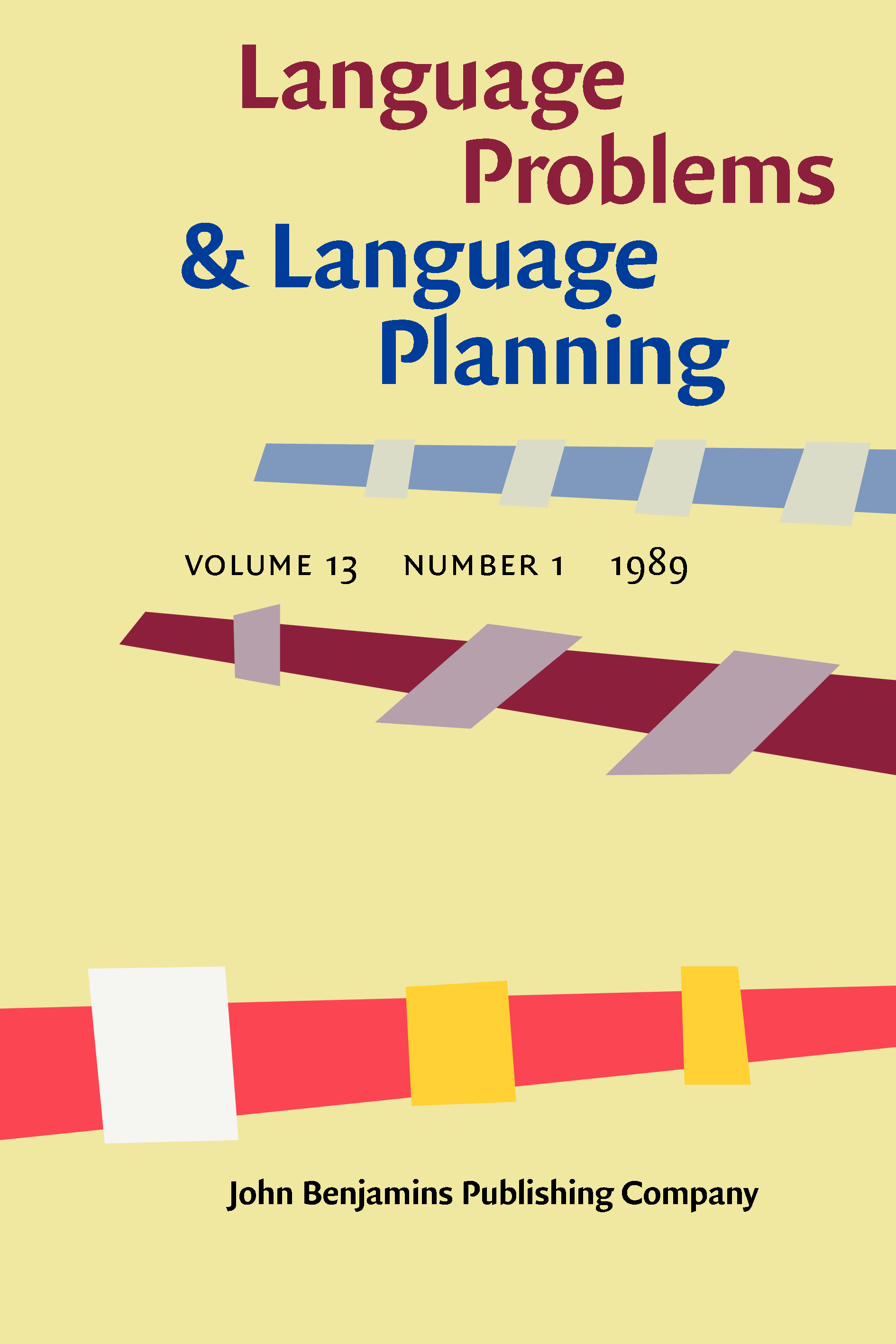
- Discipline: Language policy, policy analysis, sociolinguistics
- Language: Multilingual
- Edited by: François Grin

Publication details
- Former name(s): La monda lingvo-problemo
- History: 1977-present
- Publisher: John Benjamins Publishing Company in cooperation with the Center for Research and Documentation on World Language Problems
- Frequency: Triannually
- Impact factor: 0.4 (2023)

Standard abbreviations
- ISO 4: Lang. Probl. Lang. Plan.

Indexing
- ISSN: 0272-2690 (print); 1569-9889 (web)
- OCLC no.: 67125214

Links
- Journal homepage; Online access

Language Problems and Language Planning is a peer-reviewed academic journal published by John Benjamins Publishing Company in cooperation with the Center for Research and Documentation on World Language Problems. Its core topics are issues of language policy as well as economic and sociological aspects of linguistics.

The journal has existed in its present form since 1977. A predecessor journal, called La monda lingvo-problemo ("The world language problem" in Esperanto), had appeared since 1969 published by Mouton and edited by Victor Sadler (1969–1972) and Richard E. Wood (1973–1976). The current editor-in-chief is François Grin (University of Geneva, Switzerland).

While many articles are in English, the journal is open for articles written in any language.

== Abstracting and indexing ==
The journal is abstracted and indexed in:

- Arts and Humanities Citation Index
- Social Sciences Citation Index
- Education Resources Information Center
- International Bibliography of the Social Sciences
- Linguistic Bibliography/Bibliographie Linguistique
- MLA Bibliography
- Sociological Abstracts
- European Reference Index for the Humanities
