= Linguistic Aspects of Esperanto =

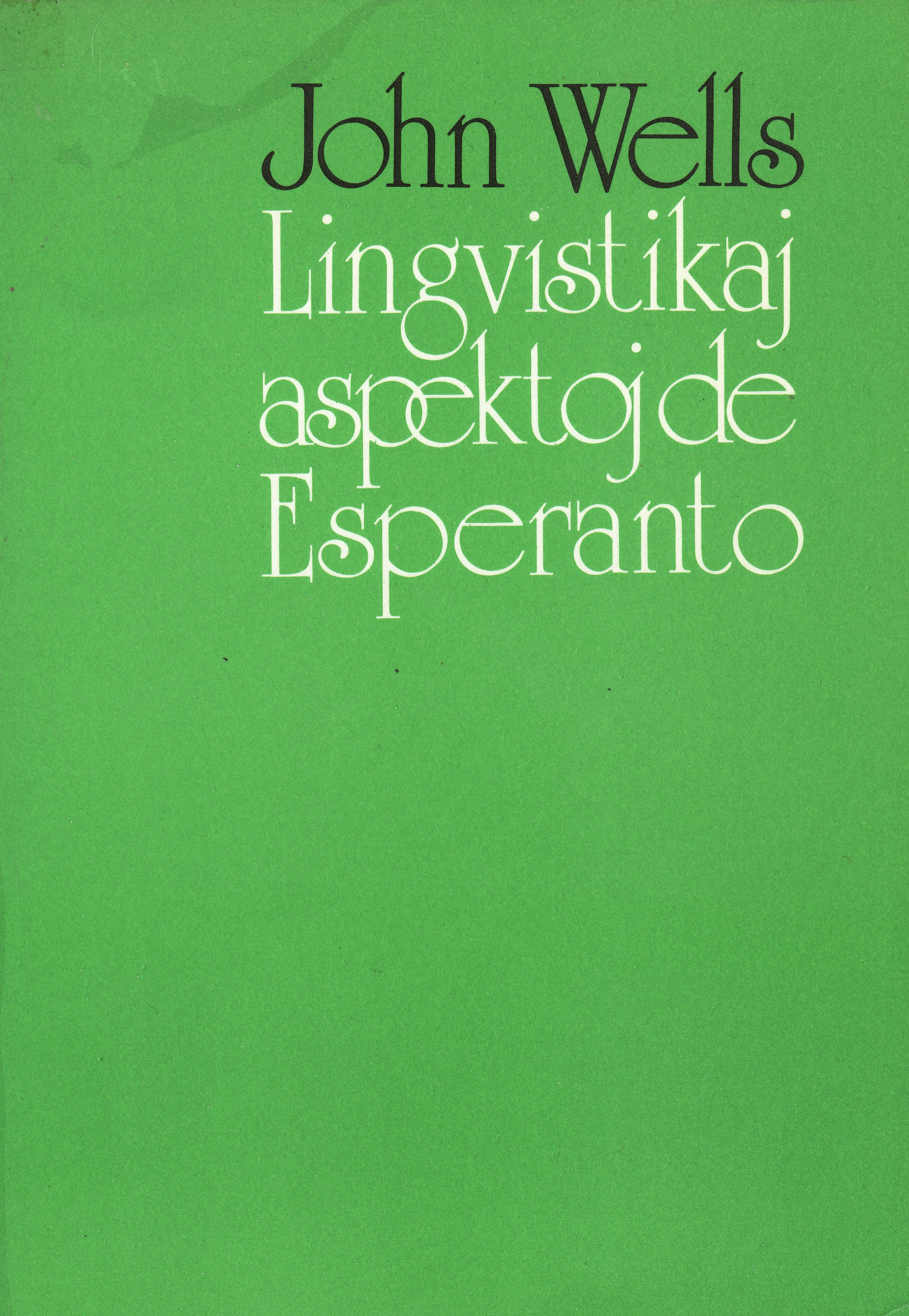

Linguistic Aspects of Esperanto (in Esperanto: Lingvistikaj aspektoj de Esperanto) is a book originally written in the Esperanto language. It is based on a study by Professor John C. Wells published by Center for Research and Documentation on World Language Problems (In Esperanto: Centro de Esploro kaj Dokumentado pri la Monda Lingvo-Problemo) in 1978.

It is a scientific, descriptive analysis of Esperanto. The book is also available in German and Danish.

== See also ==
- Esperanto
- John C. Wells
