= Center for Research and Documentation on World Language Problems =

The Center for Research and Documentation on World Language Problems (CRD) is an international research foundation created to study, document, and educate people about language problems, intercultural communication and international relations throughout the world.

== History ==
CRD was created in 1952 at the initiative of the World Esperanto Association. The Center's European headquarters is in Rotterdam, Netherlands, where its research library, the Hector Hodler Library, is located. It also operates as a unit of the University of Hartford, in the United States.

During its first two decades, CRD was guided by the Croatian jurist Ivo Lapenna. From 1974 to 2021, Humphrey Tonkin played a key role in leading the Center. Writers and researchers who have collaborated with the Center include: William Auld, Detlev Blanke, Marjorie Boulton, W. Collinson, Probal Dasgupta, Isaj Dratwer, Rudolf Haferkorn, Ulrich Lins, François Lo Jacomo, G. F. Makkink, Paul Neergaard, Robert Phillipson, Claude Piron, Juan Regulo Perez, R. Rokicki, Victor Sadler, Klaus Schubert, Tove Skutnabb-Kangas, Gaston Waringhien, and R. Wood.

Its current Board of Directors is headed by Mark Fettes and composed of Guilherme Fians, Michele Gazzola, Snehaja Venkatesh, Klaus Schubert and Humphrey Tonkin.

== Activities ==
- CRD supports the publication of the scholarly journal Language Problems and Language Planning.
- CRD publishes the multilingual, interdisciplinary journal Esperantologio / Esperanto Studies.
- The organization's newsletter, Information for Interlinguists (IfI) is a joint publication by the Center for Research and Documentation on World Language Problems (CRD) and the Esperantic Studies Foundation (ESF). It focuses on interlinguistics and is published three times a year in English and Esperanto.
- An Annual Bibliography of publications on Esperanto studies and interlinguistics is published as part of a much larger reference work by the US-based Modern Language Association.
- CRD is the main organizer of the Conference on Esperanto Studies (Esperantologiaj Konferencoj), held as part of the annual World Esperanto Congresses.
- Nitobe Symposia on language policy are organized (often with local or international partners), as are other specialist conferences and seminars, for example at the United Nations. From the Nitobe symposia emerged the Nitobe Centre for Language Democracy which "raises questions about international communication and egalitarian language policy."
- CRD also supports a study program at Adam Mickiewicz University in Poznań, Poland, which offers a 3-year postgraduate program in Interlinguistics. The program, with an international faculty and student body, focuses on international and intercultural communication, planned languages, and Esperanto Studies. In 2018-2019, the program celebrated its 20th year.
- From 1982 to 1996, together with the United Nations Office of Conference Services, CRD organized an annual conference in New York City. For most of the early years, CRD published annual conference reports, with all papers given at the conference in question. The Center now publishes, in cooperation with University Press of America, a series of monographs which includes selected papers from the conferences.
