= Heinrich August Luyken =

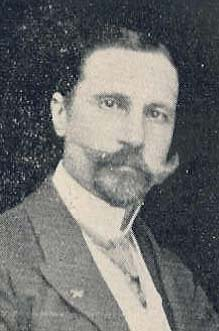
- Born: 10 December 1864; Altenkirchen
- Died: 21 September 1947 (aged 82); Amersham
- Spouse: Alice Maud Marian Newbon (born 1872, married 1892, died 1945)
- Children: Henry Luyken (1892–1955); Alwine Luyken (1894–1908); Cyril Luyken (1895–1964); Reginald Luyken (1902–1985)
- Writing career
- Language: Esperanto
- Period: 1912–1924

Heinrich August Luyken (10 December 1864 in Altenkirchen – 21 September 1947 in Amersham) was an author of various adventure novels in Esperanto.

Heinrich Luyken attended gymnasium in Düsseldorf. In 1885 he emigrated to England and acquired citizenship. He married the Englishwoman Alice Maud Marian Newbon and they had four children.

He learnt Esperanto in the year 1904 and he soon began propagating it. Heinrich Luyken is considered one of the main writers of Esperanto literature before the Second World War. He published four adventure novels between 1912 and 1924, in which his evangelical faith is reflected. In every novel the protagonist is a heretic who is "saved" by their faith.

== Bibliography ==
- Paŭlo Debenham. British Esperanto Association, London/Genf 1912
- Mirinda amo. British Esperanto Association, London 1913
- Stranga heredaĵo. Ferdinand Hirt & Sohn, Esperanto-Fako, Leipzig 1922
- Pro Iŝtar. Ferdinand Hirt & Sohn, Esperanto-Fako, Leipzig 1924
