= Khrystyna Kozlovska =

Ukrainian writer

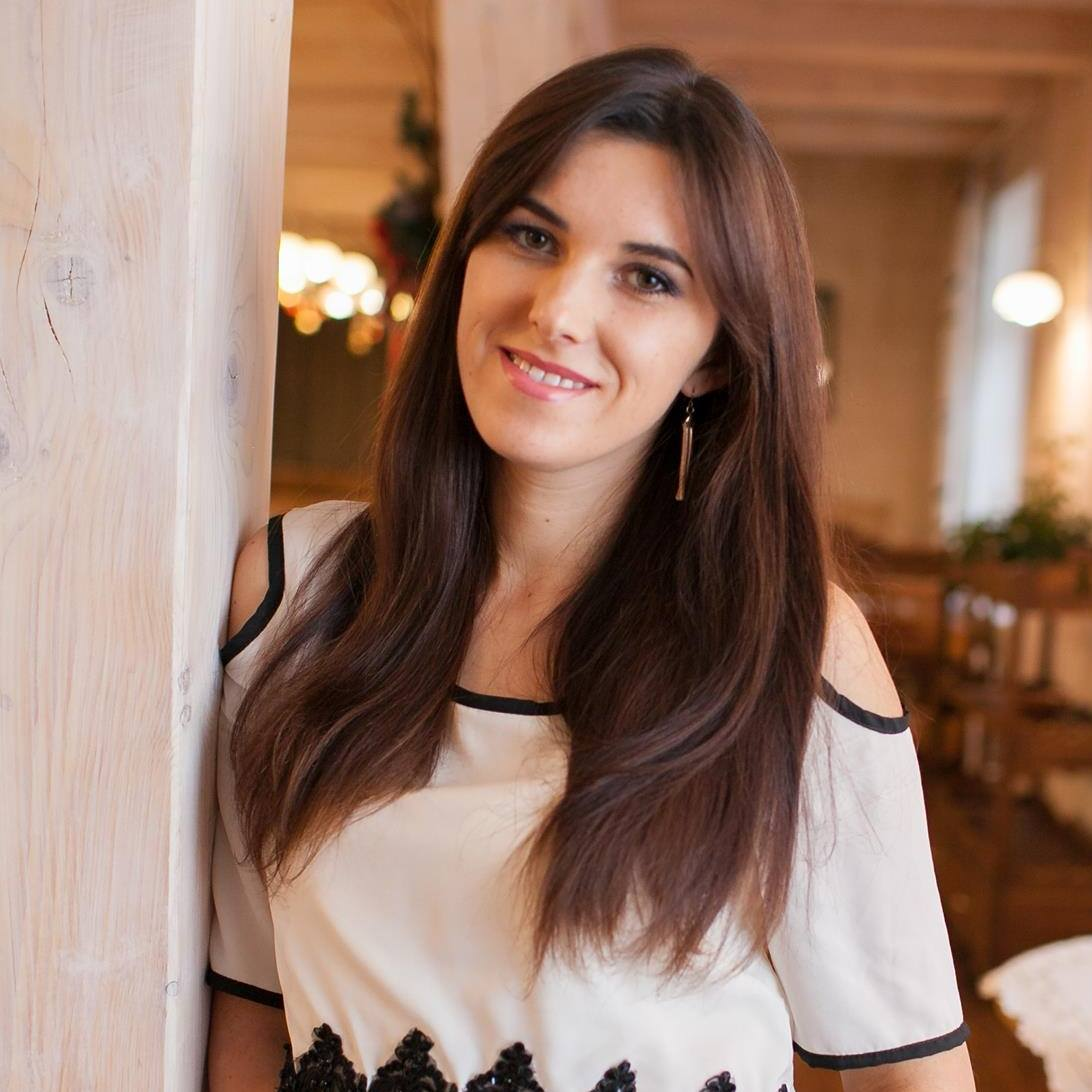
- Born: 1 May 1989 (age 37); Ivano-Frankivsk Oblast, Ukraine, Soviet Union
- Citizenship: Ukrainian
- Occupations: Writer, poet, journalist

Khrystyna Koslovska (Ukrainian: Христина Козловська; born 1 May 1989) is a Ukrainian writer, poet and journalist.

== Biography ==
She was born in Ivano-Frankivsk Oblast, Ukraine on May 1, 1989. After leaving general secondary school in her native village, she studied English philology at the National Precarpathian Vasyl Stefanyk University in Ivano-Frankivsk.

== Creative work ==
Since 2008 she has been a member of the literary studio "Nobel" (Ivano-Frankivsk) headed by Halyna Petrosanyak; participant in the collection of works "Give! Nobel Prize for Ukrainian Writers! ". Her works have been published in Ukrainian magazines ("Svit molodi", "Bukovynskyj zhurnal", "Pereval", "Literatura i zhyttia", "Halytskyi korespondent"), as well as in the newspaper of the Ukrainians of the North America - "Ukrainske Slovo". She is the author of the prose books "More Valuable than Gold" (Publisher "Discursus", Brusturiv, 2015), "A Lizard and Its Tail" (Publisher "Discursus", Brusturiv, 2018), "Last Days" ("Gravitatsiia" Publishing House, Ivano-Frankivsk, 2023, "Apostates" ("Gravitatsiia" Publishing House, Ivano-Frankivsk, 2023, a co-author of the book "Expecting. The Nine Peculiar Months" (Publisher "Discursus", Brusturiv, 2018) and the author of the poetry book "To Touch Spring" (Kolomyia, 2008). Some critics define Khrystyna Kozlovska's stories as existential absurdist prose Khrystyna Kozlovska's works were translated into Esperanto, German, Turkish, Dutch, Slovak, Korean, English and French. Some works have been translated into Esperanto by Petro Palyvoda and published in Ukraine ("Ukraina Stelo"), in China ("Penseo", PEN96.pdf, PEN297.pdf, PEN309.pdf), "Beletra Edeno"), in Canada ("La Riverego "), in the United States («Saluton!», «Beletra Almanako»), in Turkey («Turka Stelo» ), in Poland ("Pola Esperantisto"), in Croatia ("Kresko"), in Korea ("TERanidO", in Hungary ("Vesperto. Literaturaj folioj") and in Czech Republic ("Esperanta ligilo", Braille). Some works have been translated by Petro Palyvoda into German and published in "Sklianka Chasu - Zeitglas", "Aus 20 Jahren Zeitglas" and "Das Geheiminis der ukrainischen Seele" 9translated by Petro Palyvoda and Manfred Welzel, as well on Literaturportal Bayern (translated by Alexander Kratochwil). One tale has been translated by Vasil Kadifeli into Turkish and published in "Kurşun Kalem" (Turkey). One story has been translated by Rien Hamers into Dutch and published in "Tijdschrift voor Slavische Literatur" (Netherlands). One story has been translated into Slovak and published in the Anthology of the Ukrainian Prose (Slovakia). In 2022, Zindale Publishing House (Seoul, Republic of Korea) published a book of selected prose by Khrystyna Kozlovska entitled "Flower" in two languages simultaneously: Korean (translated by Jang Jeong- Yeol (Ombro), and Esperanto (translated by Petro Palyvoda), as well as the second book under the title "A magician" in three languages simultaneously: Korean (translated by Jang Jeong-Yeol (Ombro), Esperanto (translated by Petro Palyvoda and Oh Tae-Young (Mateno), and English (translated by Petro Palyvoda). In 2024, Mondial published the book "Pli leĝera ol aero" by Khrystyna Kozlovska in Esperanto (translators Petro Palyvoda and Oleksandr Hryshchenko). Khrystyna Kozlovska's poems were published in Turkish and French in the Turkish magazine "Le Dactylo Méditerranéen". The founder and the owner of the "Gravitatsiia" Publishing House, Ivano-Frankivsk.

== Prizes ==
Khrystyna Kozlovska is the winner of the poetic contest "From Autumn's Point of View" (Ivano-Frankivsk, 2011), the winner of the literary prize of the publishing house "Smoloskyp" (Ukraine) in 2014, and a laureate of that contest in 2021, a winner of the International Ukrainian-German Oles Honchar Prize for Literature, the winner of the International youth literary contest "Hranoslov-2020".
