= Metro (novel) =

1933 Dutch novel

Metropoliteno
- Author: Vladimir Varankin
- Language: Esperanto
- Genre: Social criticism, Semi-autobiographical novel
- Publisher: 3rd ed. Progreso, Sezonoj
- Publication date: 1933
- Publication place: Netherlands
- Media type: Print (Hardback)
- Pages: 200 pp

Metropoliteno (trans. Subway, Underground, Metro) is a partly autobiographical novel written in Esperanto by Vladimir Varankin about suppression by the state in Germany and the Soviet Union. It was published in Amsterdam in 1933 (200 pages), again in Denmark in 1977, and a third edition in Russia in 1992. There also exist translations in Russian and in English. It is listed in William Auld's Basic Esperanto reading List.

According to The British Esperantist, "The theme is a soviet engineer, who travels to Berlin to study construction methods for subways (underground electrical railways) ... Modern life in the Soviet Union is mirrored beside that of pre-Hitlerite Germany."
