= Tron Øgrim =

Norwegian journalist, author and politician (1947–2007)

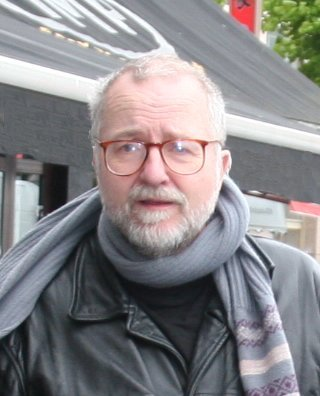
- Øgrim in 2006
- Born: 27 June 1947; Oslo, Norway
- Died: 23 May 2007 (aged 59); Oslo, Norway
- Other name: Eirik Austey
- Occupations: Journalist; author
- Spouse: Jorunn Gulbrandsen (m. 1969–1998)
- Children: 3
- Father: Otto Øgrim
- Website: steinen.net

Tron Øgrim (Norwegian pronunciation: [ˈtrʊnː ˈø̂ːɡrɪm]; 27 June 1947 – 23 May 2007) was a Norwegian journalist, author and politician. He was active in Socialist Youth Union (later Red Youth) from 1965 to 1973, and a central figure in the Workers' Communist Party from 1973 to 1984. In addition to being a politician, Øgrim was an author of political works and several science fiction novels. He was notable for communicating in a non-standard eastern Oslo dialect, even where he might have been expected to use standardized Bokmål.

== Politics and journalism ==
Born in Oslo, Øgrim was one of the most influential people in Norway's Marxist-Leninist movement in the sixties and seventies. He was one of the founders of the Workers' Communist Party, a party that strongly advocated the Chinese branch of communism. Tron was also central in founding the newspaper Klassekampen and in the publishing house Oktober.

Becoming a journalist after leaving politics in the eighties, Øgrim had a technology column in the Norwegian edition of PC World. He was known for his distinct writing style, where he rejected standard written Norwegian and, instead, wrote as he spoke, in a working class dialect. He also wrote science fiction novels under the pseudonym Eirik Austey.

Tron Øgrim was an early proponent of the Internet in Norway, frequently traveling around the country giving lectures. In 1995, he argued for the Norwegian parliament to establish an Internet presence, claiming: "Without politicians online, there is no such thing as a democratic IT policy." Øgrim was also a supporter of the open-source movement. In his book Kvikksølv, he described Linux as "applied communism". He was a mainstay contributor of the Internet newsgroup Leftist Trainspotters, where he made thousands of posts, many relating to the political developments in Nepal.

== Esperanto movement ==
A longstanding member of the Norwegian Esperanto League (Norsk Esperanto-Forbund), he never, however, accepted any formal position in the organization. Tron Øgrim was well known in the Esperanto movement for his radio series Drømmen om den fullkomne språk (The dream of a perfect language). Beginning in 1989, the programs dealt with linguistic philosophy and planned or constructed languages such as Esperanto and Volapük. He steadily turned up at international Esperanto meetings and was widely regarded as affable and scholarly, with a healthy portion of self-deprecation.

At his memorial service Leikny Øgrim told of growing up with a big brother who would read the dictionary from beginning to end and who from reading even the telephone book could learn something to relate to acquaintances. Douglas Draper, secretary of the Norwegian Esperanto League, also delivered a short talk on behalf of the NEL, by turns bantering and earnest. He said there were three kinds of Esperantists. There were active members engaged in management and organizational duties. There were passive members satisfied with paying their dues. Then there was Tron Øgrim. It might happen that for long periods the NEL would hear nothing from him; then he would telephone to ask: "Skylder jeg noe gryn?" ("Do I owe any groats?"—i.e., membership dues.) He might show up at the NEL office in Oslo and purchase not one or two books, but a whole load. While most Esperantists would plan their trips to major Esperanto congresses more than six months in advance, Tron might call up three days before the start of the event and ask what he could do to help out.

== Norwegian Wikipedia work ==
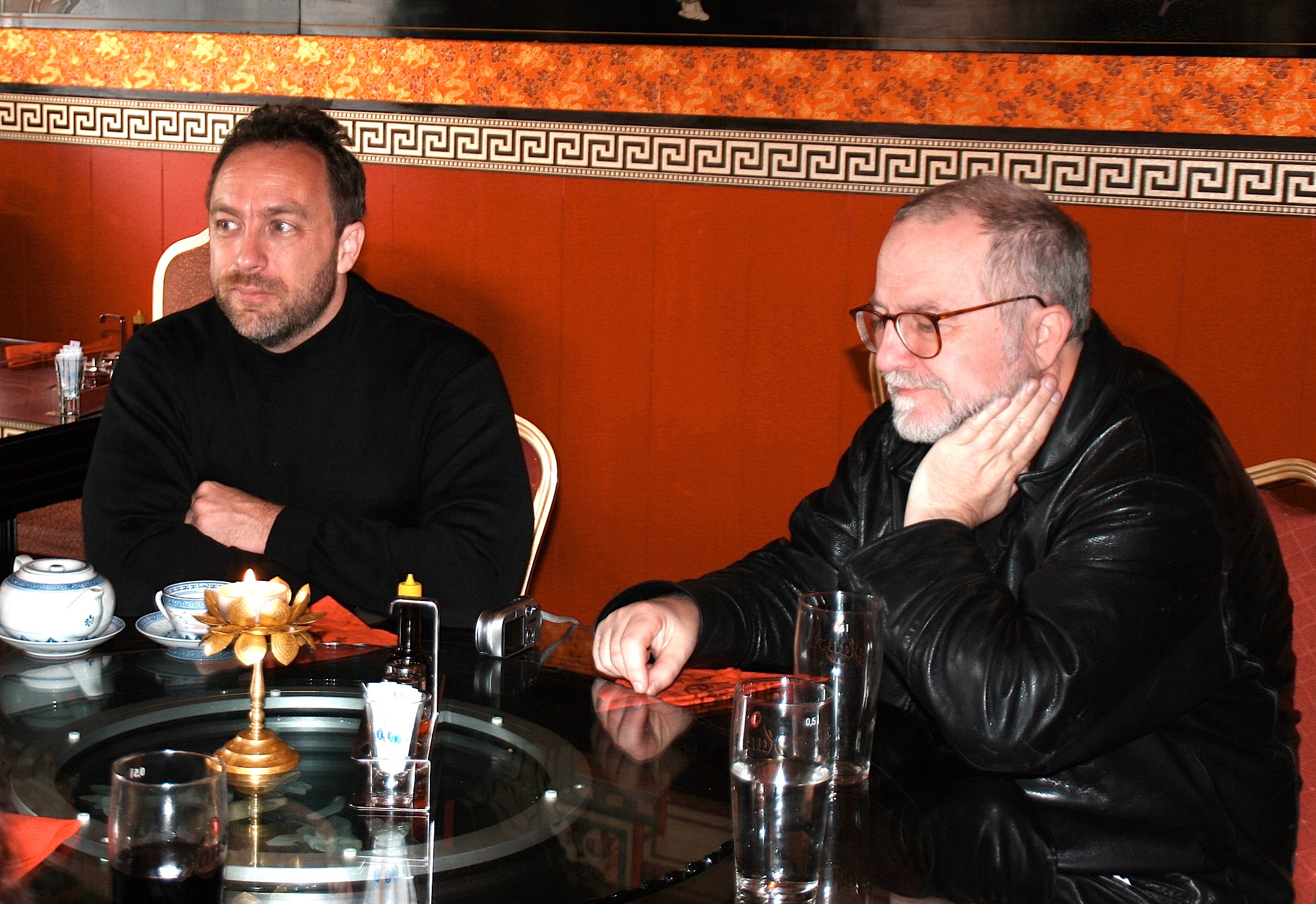
Jimmy Wales with Øgrim

Norwegian computer science lecturer Gisle Hannemyr remembers Øgrim as one of the most active Norwegian Wikipedia editors who chose Wikipedia as a platform for disseminating knowledge. Besides his articles on Nepal, he wrote on constructed languages like Esperanto and on many other topics. Hannemyr said: "I also believe that he was Norway's first blogger, with his site Under en stein i skogen ('Under a stone in the forest')." His website archives 107 of his posted articles, written in his East-Oslo idiolect. "He was absolutely a person who understood technology and how technology changes society," added Hannemyr.

== Death and legacy ==
Øgrim was found dead by one of his three daughters on 23 May 2007 in Oslo. The probable cause of death was a stroke.

The Wikipedia in Norwegian website honored Øgrim by displaying (on its pages) its logo with a Norwegian flag at half mast in the foreground, for one day.

== See also ==
- List of Wikipedia people
