= Frederic Pujulà i Vallès =

Frederic Pujulà i Vallès (Catalan pronunciation: [fɾəðəˈɾik puʒuˈlaj βəˈʎɛs]) (12 November 1877 – 14 February 1962) was a Spanish journalist, dramatist, and an Esperantist and contributor to the field of Esperanto literature. Born in Palamós, Girona, he travelled through Europe and stayed for a long time in Paris. He was involved in Joventut (1900–1906), the best "modernisme" review of Catalonia. During World War I, he fought with the French army.

Pujulà wrote "Homes Artificials" (Artificial Men) which is the first short science fiction novel in the canon of Catalan literature. It was originally published in 1912, by Biblioteca Joventut in Barcelona. In this novel, the protagonist Doctor Pericart wants to obtain a new society, unsocialized and perfect. Transformed into a demigod, he creates a group of individualized androids, which will be the seeds of the new society.

In 1914, he was in Paris with his first wife, where he was organizing en International Convention of Esperanto. When that very year the 1914-1918 war broke out, he enlisted as an infantry soldier and took part at the first battles against the German army. Later on, as he could read and write the Morse alphabet, he was transferred to Communications between detachments of the French Army. It was during this period that, as a war correspondent of the daily paper "El Diluvio" he wrote a series of articles in Spanish about how life was in the trenches. When he returned to Barcelona, he was appointed Staff editor of that newspaper, which was favourable to a federal system for Spain. When in 1941 the fascist armies entered into Barcelona, they closed "El Diluvio", because Franco considered Federalism to be an offense. Consequently, Frederic Pujulà Vallès was sent to prison, together with the owner of the paper and the owner's two sons. Frederic Pujulà received the death penalty, which was two weeks later commuted to twenty years and one day. At the end, he was set free two years and two months after he was imprisoned.

Pujulà died in Bargemon, France, in 1962.

== Works ==
=== Catalan ===
- Theater
  - El geni (1904)
  - El boig (1907, second part of El geni)
  - Dintre la gàbia (1906, with Emili Tintoré)
  - La veu del poble i El poble de la veu (1910, with Lluís Via)
- Novels
  - Titelles febles (1902)
  - Creuant la plana morta (1903)
  - El metge nou (1903)
  - Homes artificials (1912), considered as the first science fiction novel in Catalan, published again 1986 Edicions Pleniluni, ISBN 84-85752-22-8.
- Estudi Francesc Pi i Margall (1902), set of articles edited in Joventut.
- Translations into Catalan:
  - Més enllà de las forsas, of the Norwegian Björnson (1904)
  - Kaatje, theater of the Belgian Paul Spaak (1914)
  - Various novels by Georges Simenon

=== Esperanto ===
- Naivulo
- Karabandolo la plugisto
- Fiŝkaptisto kaj rigardanto
- La grafo erarinta (1908)
- Monologues
  - La Rompantoj (1907)
  - Senhejmulo
  - La Pipamanto
- Theater
  - Aŭtunaj ventoj (1909)
  - Novelo (1908)
