= Papini =

Papini is an Italian surname.

Notable people with the surname include:

- Federico Papini (born 1999), Italian footballer
- Giovanni Papini (1881–1956), Italian writer
- Guido Papini (1847–1912), Italian violinist
- Nicolas Papini (c. 1751–1834), Italian monk and historian
- Romeo Papini (born 1983), Italian footballer
- Sherri Papini (born 1982), American woman who orchestrated a kidnapping hoax in California (2016)

== See also ==
- Giuseppe Paupini (1907–1992), Italian prelate of the Catholic Church
