= Jorge Camacho (writer) =

Writer in Esperanto and Spanish (born 1966)

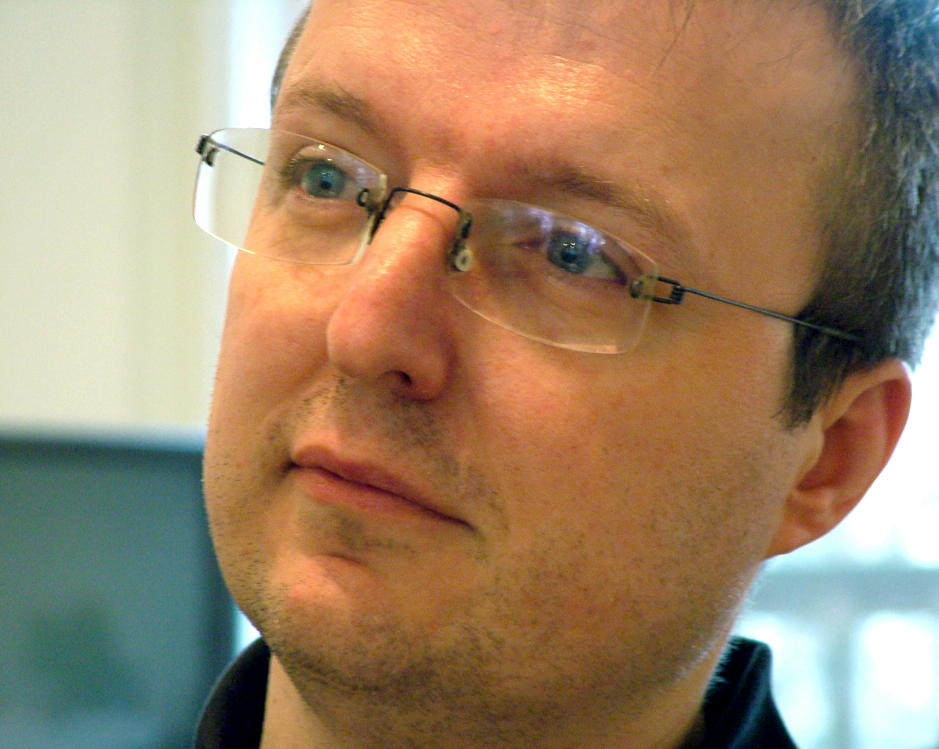
Jorge Camacho in 2007

Jorge Camacho Cordón (born 18 November 1966, Zafra) is a writer in Esperanto and Spanish.

Camacho was born in Zafra, Spain and learned Esperanto in 1980. He was a member of the Academy of Esperanto from 1992 until 2001. Since 1995 he has worked in Brussels as an interpreter for the European Union from English and Finnish into Spanish.

Camacho was elected to the Academy of Esperanto in 1992, but on 15 August 2001 he announced his resignation due to disappointment with the Esperanto movement. However, he remains active in Esperanto and continues to review literary works.

== Works ==
Camacho became famous for his poems and short stories in the late 1980s, for which he received several prizes in the Belartaj Konkursoj de UEA. In 1992 he won the Grabowski Prize, a prize for young authors writing in Esperanto. The prize is named after Antoni Grabowski.

Camacho was in the early 1990s considered a member of the so-called Ibera Skolo ("Iberian School") of Esperanto writers along with three other inhabitants of the Iberian Peninsula.

In the 1990s, Camacho began to publicly oppose Giorgio Silfer for his interpretation of the political view "Raumism". He wrote La Majstro kaj Martinelli ("The Master and Martinelli"), a biting satire of Silfer (inspired by the similarly titled novel of Mikhail Bulgakov), and criticised his ideology in La liturgio de la foiro ("The Liturgy of the Fair").

=== Poetry in Esperanto ===
- Ibere libere (with Miguel Fernández, Gonçalo Neves and Liven Dek, pseudonym of Miguel Gutiérrez, 1993)
- Celakantoj (Coelacanths; poems written in Esperanto c. 1989-1995, 2004)
- Saturno (Saturn; bilingual collection of poems written both in Spanish and Esperanto c. 1995-2004, 2004)
- Eklipsas ([It] eclipses; collection of poems written mainly in Esperanto 2004-2006, with translations into Spanish, 2007)
- Koploj kaj filandroj (poems written in Esperanto, 2009)
- En la profundo (2013)
- Strangaj spikoj (2016)
- Palestino strangolata (2016)
- Brulvunde (2017)
- Gadir (bilingual, 2025)

=== Poetry in Spanish ===
- Palestina estrangulada (Calúmnia, 2018)
- Quemadura (Vitruvio, 2020)

== Editorial work ==
Until December 2014 Jorge Camacho was editor-in-chief of the literary almanac Beletra Almanako, which was first issued in the autumn of 2007.
