= Edith Alleyne Sinnotte =

Australian writer, Esperanto novelist

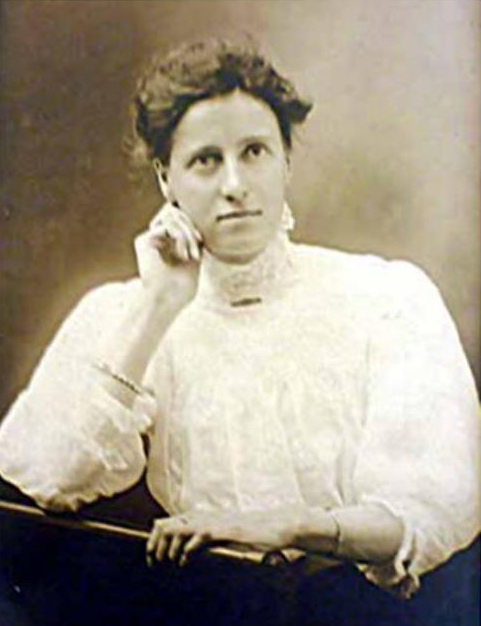
- Portrait of Sinnotte
- Born: 1871; Liverpool, UK
- Died: 15 November 1947 (aged 75–76); Balwyn, Victoria, Australia
- Occupation: Esperanto writer
- Spouse: William Henry Mumford
- Writing career
- Language: English
- Genre: novel
- Notable work: Lilio (1918)

Edith Alleyne Sinnotte (1871, Liverpool, UK – 15 November 1947, Balwyn, Victoria, Australia) was an Australian writer of British origin. She is best known as the first female Esperanto novelist.

== Life and work ==
Edith Alleyne Sinnotte was born in 1871 in Liverpool in a family of Walter Powell Sinnotte and Isabella Baylis. She learned Esperanto in the United Kingdom before emigrating to Melbourne, Australia in 1894. On 25 December 1930, she married William Henry Mumford at the Holy Trinity Church, East Melbourne.

She was a fellow of the British Esperanto Association and the president of the Mont Albert branch of the Esperanto society. In 1918 her novel Lilio was published in London by the British Esperanto Association. It became the first novel in Esperanto by a female author.

Edith Alleyne Sinnotte died suddenly on 15 November 1947 at her home in Balwyn, Victoria, and was cremated.

== Books ==
- 1918 – Lilio
