= Jan Stanisław Skorupski =

Polish writer, poet, essayist and Esperantist

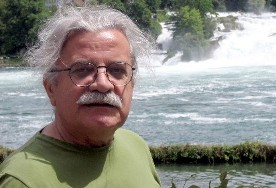
Skorupski by the river Rhine

Jan Stanisław Skorupski (born July 18, 1938 in Łoszniów, Podolia) is a Polish writer, poet, essayist and esperantist.

== Life ==
Skorupski is an internationally recognized poet. He has engaged in a multiplicity of other activities, including being a director of an art gallery and a theatre, as well as joint founder of the international group of artists 'nula horo' and the Esperanto PEN Center. Further, he was active as a captain, commercial artist, photoreporter, and jewelry manufacturer, as well as in the mining industry. He is the author of several books, and has published poetry and music CDs. He has also appeared in numerous radio shows. His texts were published in German, Polish, and Esperanto. In 1956, Skorupski received the Young Poet Award in Warsaw. He is a Swiss citizen and lives in Zurich.

== Selected works ==
- Jan Stanislaw Skorupski: Cisza, Ty i ja, Warsaw 1956.
- Jan Stanislaw Skorupski: …um unsere Würde zu wahren, Galerie sztuka polska, Berlin 1982.
- Jan Stanislaw Skorupski: do, ut, des. Gedichte von Kunst und Liebe. Verlag Polonia, Warsaw 1988.
- Jan Stanislaw Skorupski: …um die Polen zu verstehen. Aufbau-Taschenbuch-Verl., Berlin 1991.
- SONETADO 8784 sonnets. editio L., Zurich (1995-2006)

== Entry in Guinness Book of records ==
In 1998, Skorupski was featured in the German Edition of The Guinness Book of Records as an author of the most sonnets (page 145): Zurich (CH) based polish writer Jan Stanislaw Skorupski is the author of the most sonnets: He wrote 2928 poems in the time of January 1st, 1995 till June 12th, 1997 in two languages, Polish and Esperanto respectively.
