= Vladimir Varankin =

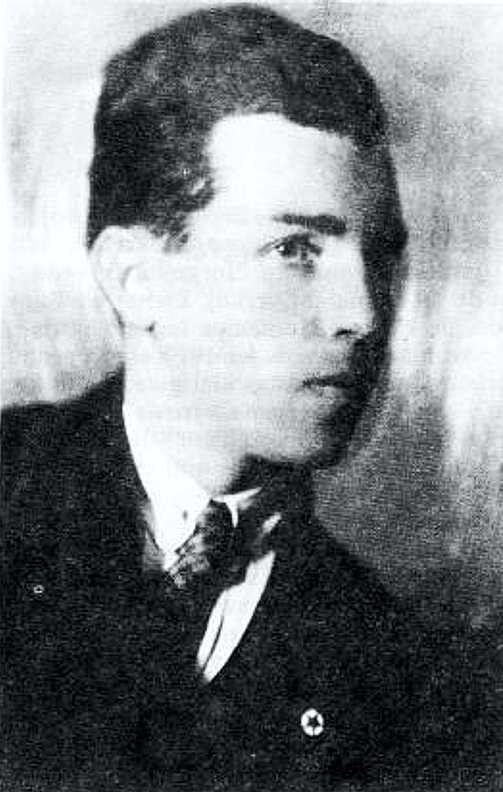
Varankin in 1931

Vladimir Valentinovich Varankin (Russian: Влади́мир Валенти́нович Вара́нкин; 12 November 1902 – 3 October 1938) was a Soviet writer of literature in Esperanto, an instructor of western European history, and director of the Moscow Ped. Instituto for foreign languages. He wrote the novel Metropoliteno.

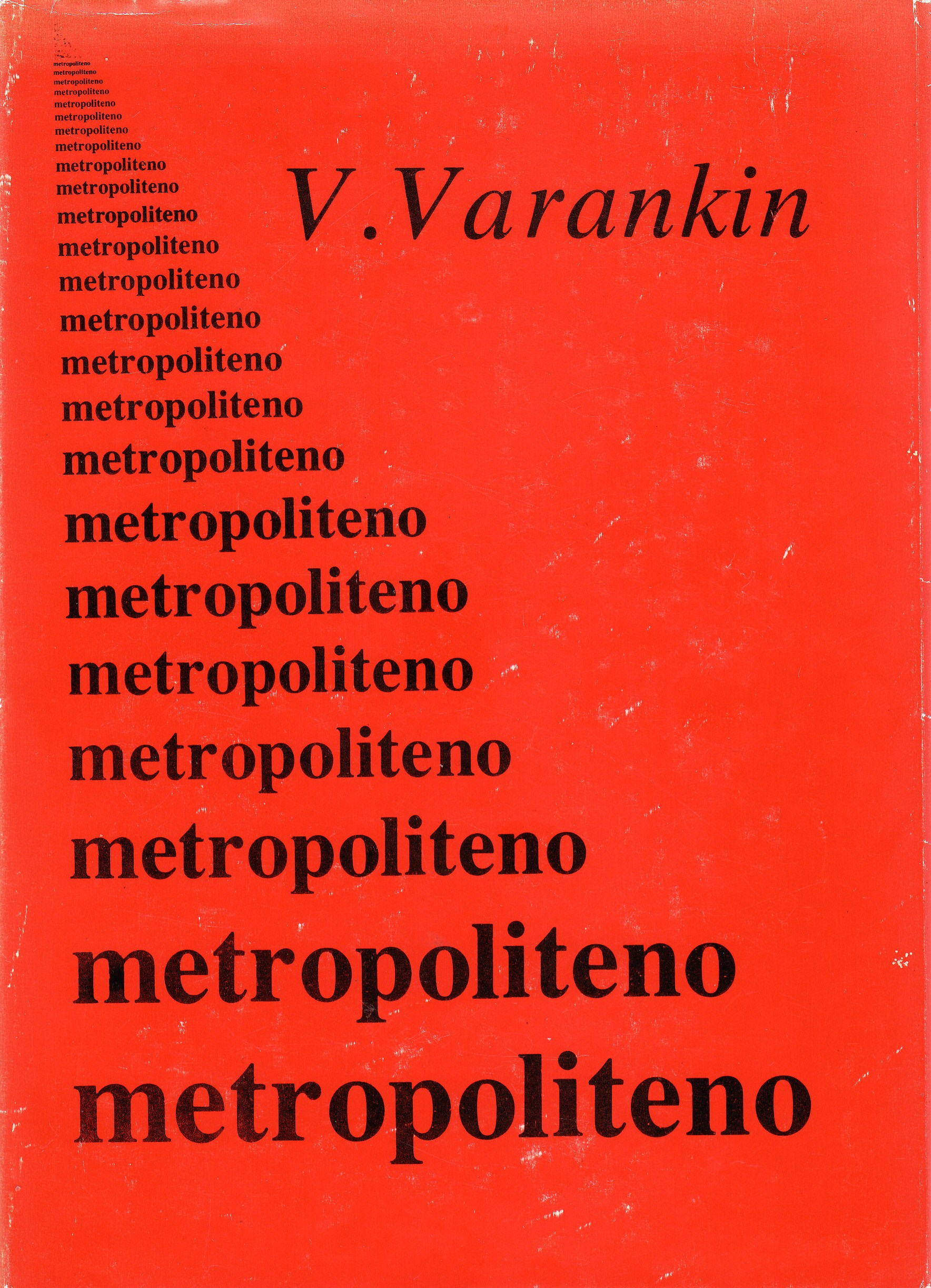
Metropoliteno, edition of 1977

== Family background ==
Varankin was born in Nizhny Novgorod, in an office worker's family. He was of Russian ethnicity. His father Valentin Yegorovich Varankin (died 1921), managed a savings bank until he was recruited into the Red Army. Varankin's mother, Nina Alekseyevna (died 1953), was a librarian. Besides Vladimir, the family had two other sons: Yuriy (born 1906, died 1988) and Vyacheslav (born 1916), who was still alive several years ago.

== Learning Esperanto, early Esperanto activity ==
During his last year of study at the city high school (1919), he began learning Esperanto with several friends, boys and girls. Together with his equally young friends, he soon founded a little city circle of young Esperantists, which later transformed into the provincial (gubernia) circle. Both in the city and in the gubernia that union carried out an active program: in less than a year the union managed to organize six courses of Esperanto in the city itself, forty cells and little circles in the whole gubernia, and in addition, in several places, (with the help of local Esperanto instructors) even to teach the international language in the schools.

For one or two years he and his friends vastly developed their Esperanto activity. Starting then he began active, energetic, impetuous activity. Besides little circles, courses, and cells, he organized promotional spectaculars and put on sketches, whose text he wrote himself, or translated, or took from pre-revolutionary Esperanto reviews (for example, from La Ondo de Esperanto, The Esperanto Wave). He himself began to publish a newspaper Ruĝa Esperantisto, Red Esperantist. In this newspaper (under the pseudonym Vol-Volanto, 'Want-Wanter') the twenty-year-old Varankin published his verses and the verses of his friends, articles, translations, announcements, survey results, and also calls to the national and foreign Esperanto community to help the hungry in the young soviet republic. However, at that time he wrote in an Esperanto that was full of errors and very Russianesque.

In 1920 with several friends he even attempted to organize in Nizhny Novgorod the third PanRussian Esperantist Convention, but that failed because chaos and the difficult economic situation in the country did not yet permit organizing the arrangements. The convention came about one year later in Petrograd, and at the convention they founded the Sovetlanda Esperantista Unio (later the Sovetrespublikara Esperantista Unio) (SEU). Young Vladimir Varankin was elected as a member of its central committee.

== First jobs ==
After school young Vladimir worked for some time in an electric energy organization. But soon he enrolled in a cavalry school and served there as a political collaborator. At the same time he was a librarian and club director. In the autumn of 1922 he moved with the cavalry school to Tver and immediately began to work actively for Esperanto.

== Administrative Esperanto activity ==
He progressed rapidly also within SEU. At the first SEU Convention (1923, Moscow) Varankin was elected a member of the managing board of the convention and reelected as a member of the central committee. At the end of 1925 the newspaper Mezhdunarodny Yazyk (International Language) began to publish a series of his lessons and methods for the advertising of Esperanto, which continued through all of 1926. Among other things he put the main emphasis not just on advertising but on practical usage. The central committee of the SEU commissioned him to lead the publicity effort.

At the end of 1927 he moved to Moscow, after the nineteenth Universala Kongreso (UK) (World Convention of Esperanto) in Danzig. Among other things, the German veteran Esperantist Konstantin Behnert, who knew Varankin in Tver, tells that after the Danzig UK, Varankin visited Germany without permission and later incautiously mentioned that - with the result that he had to report monthly to register with the police.

== Esperanto publications ==
In 1929 he wrote the textbook Teorio de Esperanto (Theory of Esperanto) and a year later also the textbook Esperanto por laboristoj (Esperanto for Workers). Vladimir Varankin was elected from the beginning a member of the board of secretaries, later director of the organizational department, vice president and finally general secretary of the All-Russia committee of SEU. He became a full-fledged member of the Language commission at SEU and member of the Language committee at the Akademio de Esperanto (Academy of Esperanto).

In 1932 in Nova Etapo (New Stage) there appeared several chapters from Metropoliteno under the title Barikadoj (Barricades).

== Professional life ==
Meanwhile, he completed his course at the faculty of social sciences at the Moscow State University the Institute of Foreign Affairs and became director of the Technical College of Foreign Languages, where he also taught history.

== Arrest, execution, and exoneration ==
During the night of 7 February 1938 — 8 February 1938 Varankin was arrested. They condemned him as an active member of Union Center, which never existed; he was accused of spying and sabotage, anti-Soviet propaganda, plotting to murder Joseph Stalin and the like.

In April 1989 the Procurator's Office of the Soviet Union officially released the following information: Vladimir Valentinovich Varankin, born in 1902 in Nizhny Novgorod, member of the Communist Party since 1925, expelled from it because of a criminal accusation, director before the arrest of the 2nd Moscow Pedagogical Institute of Foreign Languages, was sentenced by the Military college of the Supreme Court of the Soviet Union to be executed by gunfire and to have all his possessions confiscated on the third of October 1938, for participation in a fascist spy organization "Soyuzny Tsentr" (Union Center), existing under the auspices of the Esperantist organization, with the aim of overthrowing Soviet power through espionage, sabotage, terrorist acts against the leadership of the Communist Party and the Soviet government. The verdict was carried out on the same day in Moscow without right of appeal or amnesty. All confiscated possessions, including manuscripts, letters, documents, archives, books were destroyed as "ideologically unuseful" and "without any current or historical value". The official answer says that "the place of burial is not indicated in the file".

Twenty years later the Military college of the Supreme Court looked into the matter. The investigation revealed that V. Varankin was convicted totally without basis, and in connection with that the Military college of the Supreme court of the Soviet Union nullified the verdict on 11 May 1957 and threw out the accusation as having an absolute lack of criminal content. V. Varankin was fully exonerated.

== Works ==
- Esperanto por laboristoj
- Metropoliteno, 1933, 1977 - novel originally written in Esperanto, 200 p.
- Teorio de Esperanto, 1929 - in this book Varankin deals with the international language generally, with its etymology, lexicon, syntax, etc.

== Sources ==
The first version of this page is a translation from the entry on Vladimir Varankin in the Esperanto Vikipedio.
