= Trevor Steele =

Australian Esperantist (born 1940)

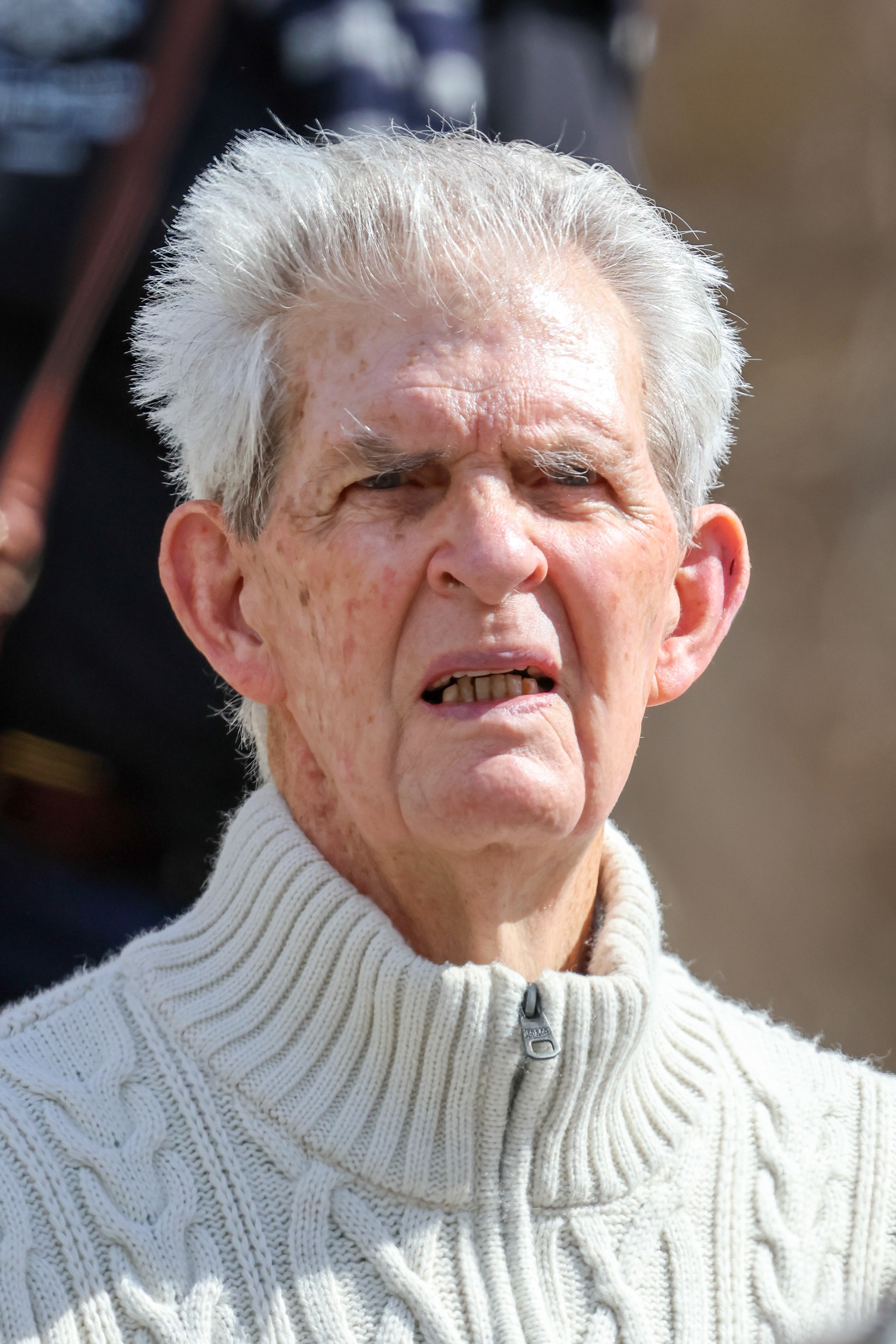
Steele in 2026

Trevor Steele (born 1940) is an Australian Esperantist who has written numerous short stories and novels in Esperanto. Steele's work is strongly influenced by his travel experiences in Germany, Western Europe and elsewhere, and is further enriched by experiences in Asia and Australia, mainly concerning indigenous people's problems, which were his concern during his year and a half of working at the Australian education department. He wrote two important books about relationships between the indigenous and non-indigenous populations, Flugi kun kakatuoj (2010)—published in English as Soaring with cockatoos (2012) and in French as Comme un vol d'oiseaux sacrés (2013)—and Paradizo ŝtelita (Paradise stolen, 2012). His autobiography, Konvinka kamuflaĵo ("Convincing camouflage"), was published in 2014.

Steele's books are grounded in authenticity, to which he adds a bit of fantasy. Except for Apenaŭ papilioj en Bergen-Belsen, originally written in English as "No butterflies in Bergen-Belsen", all his published books were written originally in Esperanto, after which he translated them for possible publication in English. He once told Chuck Smith that while his Esperanto books sold steadily and found a ready publisher, he had many more difficulties in marketing his English works.

== Essays ==
Steele has contributed essays to Beletra Almanako, the three-times-a-year periodical of Esperanto belles-lettres. One piece, Aurelius skribis a. P., appeared in the March 2008 issue, and Aventuroj de naivulo en la oceano de literatura 'business' ("Adventures of a simpleton"), appeared in the September 2008 issue. The first of these imagines Aurelius, a sympathetic but skeptical Roman, writing a biography of Jesus after interviewing witnesses to his life from before the time of Apostle Paul, and thereby provides background to Steele's later book Reluctant Messiah.

The second essay tells of Steele's attempts to have some of his English-language manuscripts published. University of Queensland Press, an honest publisher, showed him their stacks of manuscripts reaching to the ceiling and poignantly told him they could only publish six books per year. He happened to fall victim to a vanity press scheme, which bilked him and then declared bankruptcy before it was exposed as fraudulent. He once tried publishing through Lulu.com, but found that their service resulted in his books having a prohibitively high cover price. Later, he tried to deal with a literary agent.

== Esperanto activities ==
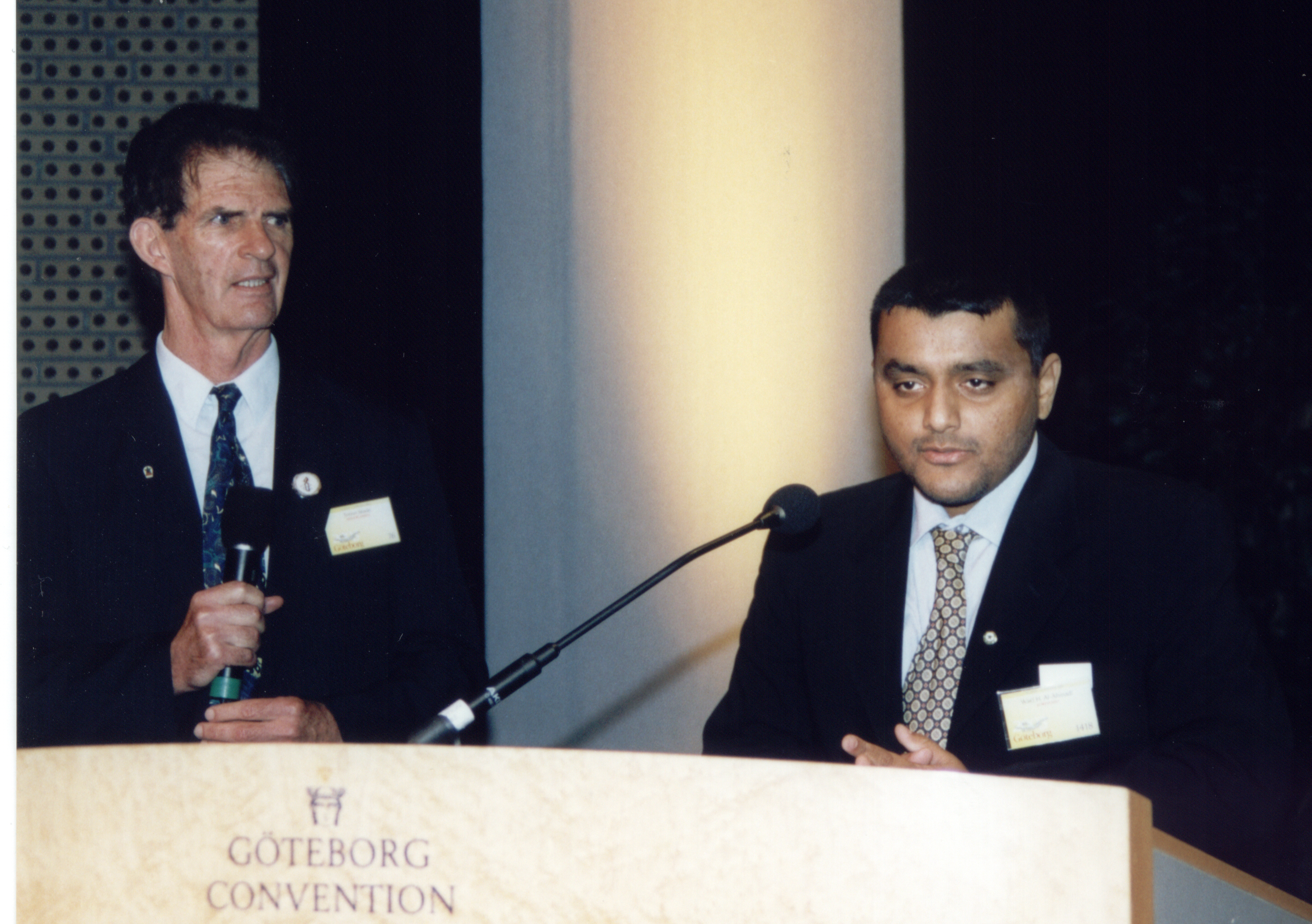
Trevor Steele (left) in 2003 at the Esperanto World Congress, Gothenburg, Sweden

At the 82nd World Congress of Esperanto in Adelaide, Steele delivered a lecture about the life and work of the late Patrick White (1912–1990), an accomplished fellow Australian who had won the 1973 Nobel Prize in Literature. The Esperanto text of that lecture is available on line.

From the beginning of 2002 until April 2004 Steele worked as director general of the World Esperanto Association's central office. However, he had little previous administrative experience, a fact he freely admits, and after criticism from other people within the office and in the association in general, he announced his resignation in October 2003. "One reason was that I felt that as the director general in Rotterdam I was, paradoxically, not able to do much for Esperanto," he laments. "When I was in Lithuania, for example, I taught the language to probably a thousand people, but in Rotterdam there was nothing doing in that regard."

Returning to Australia, Steele taught German and mediaeval and modern history at a Steiner school before his retirement from teaching. Until 2010 Steele was an elected member of the Akademio de Esperanto, the independent body of language scholars who shepherd the evolution of the planned language Esperanto.

== Translations ==
In 2014 Steele's English translation of Brazilian Esperantist Gersi Alfredo Bays's work "La Profeto el Pedras" (2000) appeared under the title The prophet from Pedras (Mondial, 192 pages, ISBN 978-1595692702). Loving Nora, his English translation of Anja Saskia Beyer's German-language Himbeersommer was also e-published that year (Amazon Digital, 228 pages, ASIN B00IFVXK3U)

== Published works ==
- 1987: Sed nur fragmento ("But only a fragment"). The third edition of this novel was published in 2020 by Mondial, New York, ISBN 9781595694072. An English version is available as Fatal empires. (2013)
- 1992: Memori kaj forgesi: noveloj el la Norda Montaro ("Remember and forget: stories from the Northern Mountains"), later published in English as Remember and forget (1995)
- 1994: Apenaŭ papilioj en Bergen-Belsen. Published in English as No butterflies in Bergen-Belsen (Minerva, 453 pages, ISBN 978-1861069818)
- 1997: Falantaj muroj kaj aliaj rakontoj ("Falling walls, and other stories"), travelogues mainly about the former Soviet Union
- 1999: Australia Felix, 132 pages. ISBN 9783901752155
- 2000: Neniu ajn papilio ("No butterflies whatsoever")
- 2001: La fotoalbumo: unua volumo ("Photo album, volume 1")
- 2005: Diverskolore: originalaj prozaĵoj. ("Various colours: original prose pieces"), Kaliningrad: Sezonoj, 112 pages.
- 2005: La fotoalbumo: dua volumo ("Photo album, volume 2")
- 2006: Kaj staros tre alte ("And will stand tall"). English version "Lifted up" was later published as Reluctant Messiah (Mondial, 292 pages, 2010, ISBN 978-1595691736), a life of Jesus.
- 2007: Death and Empire in the Tropics, 379 pages, ISBN 9781411675155. Reprinted as Fatal empires (Mirador, 326 pages, 2013, ISBN 978-1909220270). English translation of Sed nur fragmento (1987)
- 2009: Kvazaŭ ĉio dependus de mi (Flandra Esperanto-Ligo, 344 pages, ISBN 978-90-77066-41-6). Published in English as As though everything depended on me (Mirador, 260 pages, 2012, ISBN 978-1908200976)
- 2010: Flugi kun kakatuoj (Flandra Esperanto-Ligo, 256 pages, ISBN 978-90-77066-46-1), later published in English as Soaring with cockatoos (Mirador, 234 pages, 2012, ISBN 978-1908200709), translated to French by Ginette Martin as Comme un vol d'oiseaux sacrés (Kava-Pech, 262 pages, 2013, ISBN 978-80-87169-44-5) and translated into German by Christian Cimpa as Der Flug des Kakadus (Phoibos, 346 pages, 2019, ISBN 978-3-85161-208-0).
- 2012: Paradizo ŝtelita (Flandra Esperanto-Ligo, 336 pages, ISBN 978-90-77066-49-2). Later published in English as Paradise stolen, (Mirador, 234 pages, 2012, ISBN 978-1908200938).
- 2014: Konvinka kamuflaĵo ("Convincing camouflage"), autobiography, Flandra Esperanto-Ligo

Non-profit organization positions
| Preceded by Osmo Buller | Directors general of the World Esperanto Association; 2002–2004 | Succeeded by Osmo Buller |
