= Johan Hammond Rosbach =

Johan Hammond Rosbach (22 August 1921 – 7 September 2004) was a Norwegian author and Esperantist.

== Bibliography ==
His best known work, Fianĉo de l'Sorto, (Dansk Esperanto Forlag) 1977, was listed among notable Esperanto works. An English translation by E. J. Lieberman was approved by him and will be published as "Fiancé of Fate."
