= Julio Baghy =

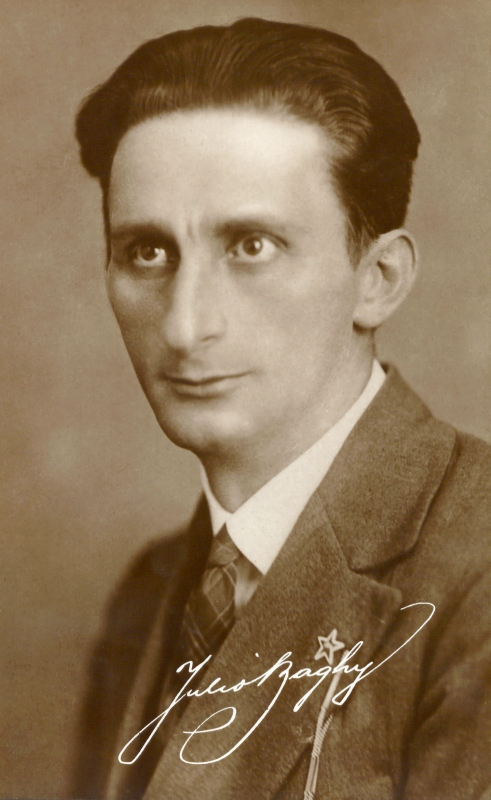
Julio Baghy, 1925

Julio Baghy (13 January 1891, Szeged – 18 March 1967, Budapest; in Hungarian Baghy Gyula) was a Hungarian actor and one of the leading authors of the Esperanto movement. He is the author of several famous novels but it is particularly in the field of poetry that he proved his mastery of Esperanto.

== Early life ==
Baghy was born into a theatrical family — his father was an actor, and his mother a stage prompter. He began learning Esperanto in 1911. He started work as an actor and theatre manager, but the First World War intervened and took him out of his home country for six years.

He was captured and made a prisoner of war in Siberia. It was during this time that he began to work for the Esperanto movement, writing poetry and teaching the language to his fellow inmates.

== Literary works ==
=== Books ===
Baghy wrote two books on the subject of captivity in Siberia: Viktimoj (Victims, 1925), and Sur Sanga Tero (On Bloody Soil, 1933), republished together as a single volume in 1971. His satirical novel Hura! (Hooray!, 1930) was somewhat less of a success. Its sequel Insulo de Espero (Island of Hope) was lost during the war.

His most famous novel Printempo en Aŭtuno (Spring in Autumn) was written in 1931.

=== Poetry ===
Baghy is best known for his poetry. His first poems were written during his time of captivity in Siberia. Hitherto those poets, such as Zamenhof, who had written in Esperanto were limited by the still young language, and apart from Antoni Grabowski, no poet had managed to make a mark on the language.

Baghy's most significant collections of poems was his first: Preter la Vivo (Beyond Life, published in 1922). Among his more notable collection of poems are Pilgrimo (Pilgrim, 1926) and Vagabondo Kantas (The Vagabond Sings, 1933).

In 1966 he produced Ĉielarko (Rainbow), retelling in verse folk tales from twelve different nations. His last collection of poems, Aŭtunaj folioj (Autumn leaves), was published posthumously in 1970.

== Esperanto movement ==
Returning to Hungary after the war, he became one of the principal teachers of the Esperanto movement, organising newsgroups and literary evenings. In addition to working in his native Hungary, he organised courses in countries such as Estonia, Latvia, the Netherlands and France.

He was one of the principal writers for the Esperanto literary review Literatura Mondo until 1933.

His works reflect a slogan of his: Amo kreas pacon, Paco konservas homecon, Homeco estas plej alta idealismo. (Love creates peace, Peace preserves humanity, Humanity is the highest ideal.)

Several of his works were granted awards by the Academy of Esperanto and a number of his novels have been translated into several languages.

== Bibliography ==
- M. Boulton, Poeto fajrakora. La verkaro de Julio Baghy, Saarbrücken: Artur E. Iltis, 1983. p. 144
- Clelia Conterno, Baghy tra la tempo, in Literatura Foiro n. 43–44, jun-aŭg 1977, p 10-11
- G. Silfer, La leginda Baghy, in Literatura Foiro n. 65, feb 1981, p 4-5

== See also ==
- Kálmán Kalocsay
