= Claude Piron =

Swiss translator and Esperantist (1931–2008)

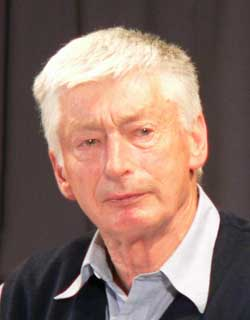
- Piron, Boulogne Congress, 2005
- Born: 26 February 1931; Namur, Belgium
- Died: 22 January 2008 (aged 76); Gland, Switzerland

Claude Piron, also known by the pseudonym Johán Valano, was a Swiss psychologist, Esperantist, translator, and writer. He worked as a translator for the United Nations from 1956 to 1961 and then for the World Health Organization.

He was a prolific author of Esperanto works. He spoke Esperanto from childhood and used it in Japan, China, Uzbekistan, Kazakhstan, in Africa and Latin America, and in nearly all the countries of Europe.

== Life ==
Piron was a psychotherapist and taught from 1973 to 1994 in the psychology department at the University of Geneva in Switzerland. His French-language book Le défi des langues – Du gâchis au bon sens (The Language Challenge: From Chaos to Common Sense, 1994) is a kind of psychoanalysis of international communication. A Portuguese version, O desafio das linguas, was published in 2002 (Campinas, São Paulo, Pontes).

In a lecture on the current system of international communication Piron argued that "Esperanto relies entirely on innate reflexes" and "differs from all other languages in that you can always trust your natural tendency to generalize patterns... The same neuropsychological law...—called by Jean Piaget generalizing assimilation—applies to word formation as well as to grammar."

His diverse Esperanto writings include instructional books, books for beginners, novels, short stories, poems, articles and non-fiction books. His most famous works are Gerda malaperis! and La Bona Lingvo (The Good Language).

Gerda malaperis! is a novella which uses basic grammar and vocabulary in the first chapter and builds up to expert Esperanto by the end, including word lists so that beginners may easily follow along.

In La Bona Lingvo, Piron captures the basic linguistic and social aspects of Esperanto. He argues strongly for imaginative use of the basic Esperanto morpheme inventory and word-formation techniques, and against unnecessary importation of neologisms from European languages. He also presents the idea that, once one has learned enough vocabulary to express himself, it is easier to think clearly in Esperanto than in many other languages.

Piron is the author of a book in French, Le bonheur clés en main (The Keys to Happiness), which distinguishes among pleasure, happiness and joy. He showed how one may avoid contributing to his own "anti-happiness" (l'anti-bonheur) and how one may expand the areas of happiness in his life. Piron's view was that, while one may desire happiness, desire is not enough. He said that just as people must do certain things in order to become physically stronger, they must do certain things in order to become happier.

== See also ==
- Esperanto
- Machine translation

== Sources ==
- Claude Piron, Le défi des langues – Du gâchis au bon sens (The Language Challenge: From Chaos to Common Sense), Paris, L'Harmattan, 1994.
- Claude Piron, Le bonheur clés en main (The Keys to Happiness), Saint-Maurice, Saint Augustin, 1998.
