= Antoni Grabowski =

Polish chemical engineer

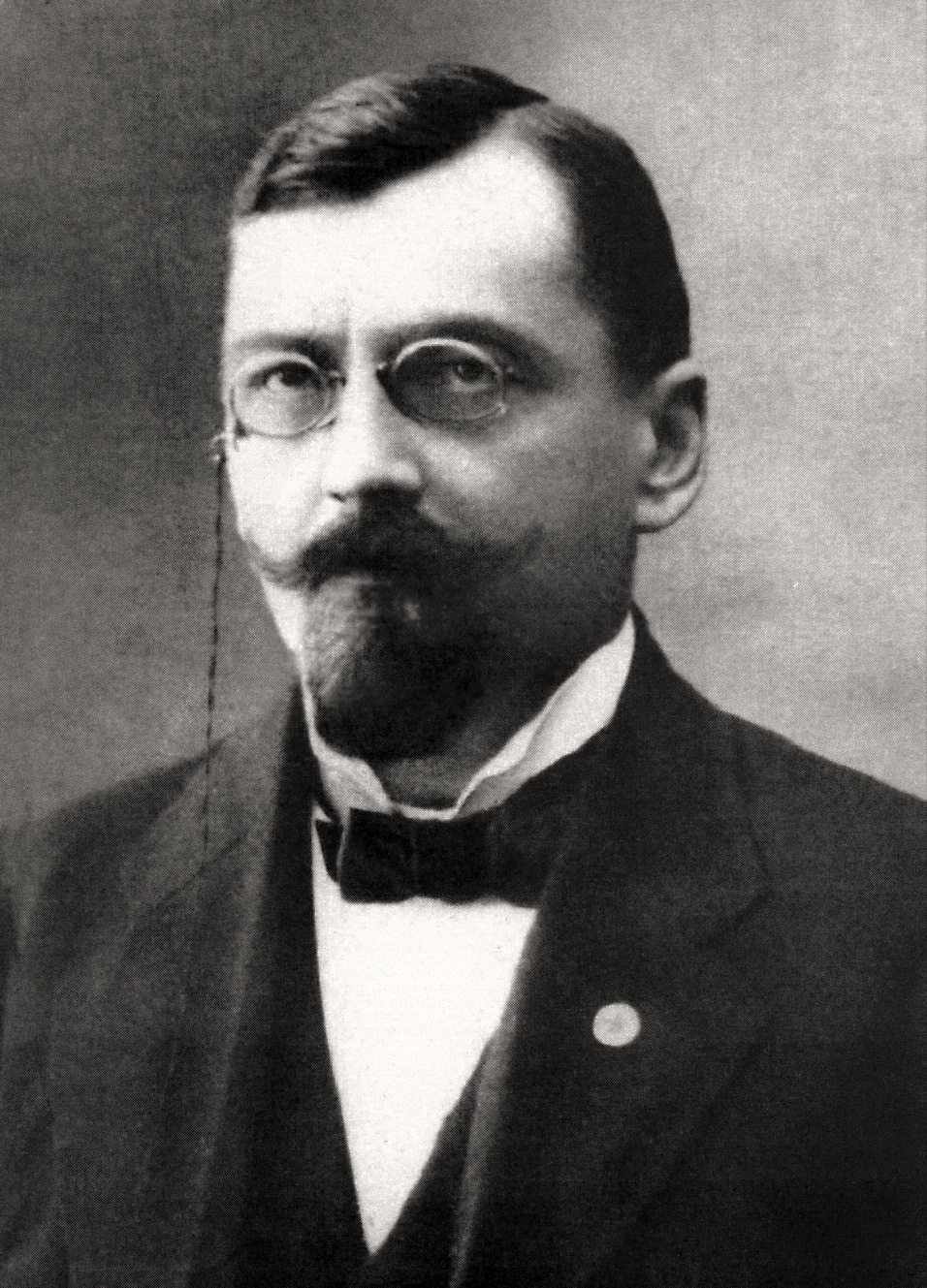
Antoni Grabowski

Antoni Grabowski (11 June 1857 – 4 July 1921) was a Polish chemical engineer, and an activist of the early Esperanto movement. His translations had an influential impact on the development of Esperanto into a language of literature.

== Education and career ==
Grabowski was born in Nowe Dobra, a village 10 km northeast of Chełmno, in the Kingdom of Prussia. Soon after his birth, the family moved from Nowe Dobra to Thorn, Prussia (now Toruń, Poland). Due to his parents' poverty, Grabowski had to start working soon after leaving elementary school. Nevertheless, he prepared himself, driven by a great desire to learn, to take the entrance exam for grammar school (Gymnasium), which he passed with flying colours. At the Copernicus School in Thorn, after demonstrating a knowledge far exceeding others of his age, he twice skipped a grade. In 1879, the family's financial situation improved and, after his Abitur exam, Grabowski studied philosophy and natural science at the University of Breslau in Breslau (now Wrocław).

After graduation he worked as a practical chemical engineer in Zawiercie and in locations which now are part of the Czech Republic, and finally as manager of a textile factory in Ivanovo-Voznesensk, 250 km north-east of Moscow.

Meanwhile, he continued his in-depth studies into chemical problems. He was known among experts in the field throughout Europe for a multitude of inventions and technological innovations. Grabowski published many articles, including some describing his inventions, in the journals Chemik Polski ("Polish Chemist") and Przegląd Techniczny ("Technical Survey"). During this time he translated a standard chemistry textbook by Ira Remsen from English to Polish. Later Grabowski was appointed to a commission tasked with drawing up Polish technical terminology. A few years later (1906) he published his Słownik chemiczny, the first Polish chemical dictionary.

== Disappointment with Volapük ==
Even at the university, Grabowski had developed a far-reaching literary interest, joining the Slavic Literary Society (Towarzystwo Literacko-Słowianskie). His endeavour was in no way limited to Polish language and literature; gradually he learnt a considerable number of languages and became a true polyglot. Apart from his mother tongue, he was eventually able to speak nine additional languages and passively to use at least another 15. With his linguistic background, Grabowski also became interested in the idea of an international language. Having learned Volapük, he decided to visit Johann Schleyer, the author of this language project. Seeing that even Schleyer himself was unable to speak Volapük fluently and that Grabowski and Schleyer had been forced to converse in German instead, Grabowski formed the conclusion that Volapük was unsuitable for everyday use. After this disappointment, Grabowski gave up his work on Volapük but maintained an active interest in the idea of an international planned language.

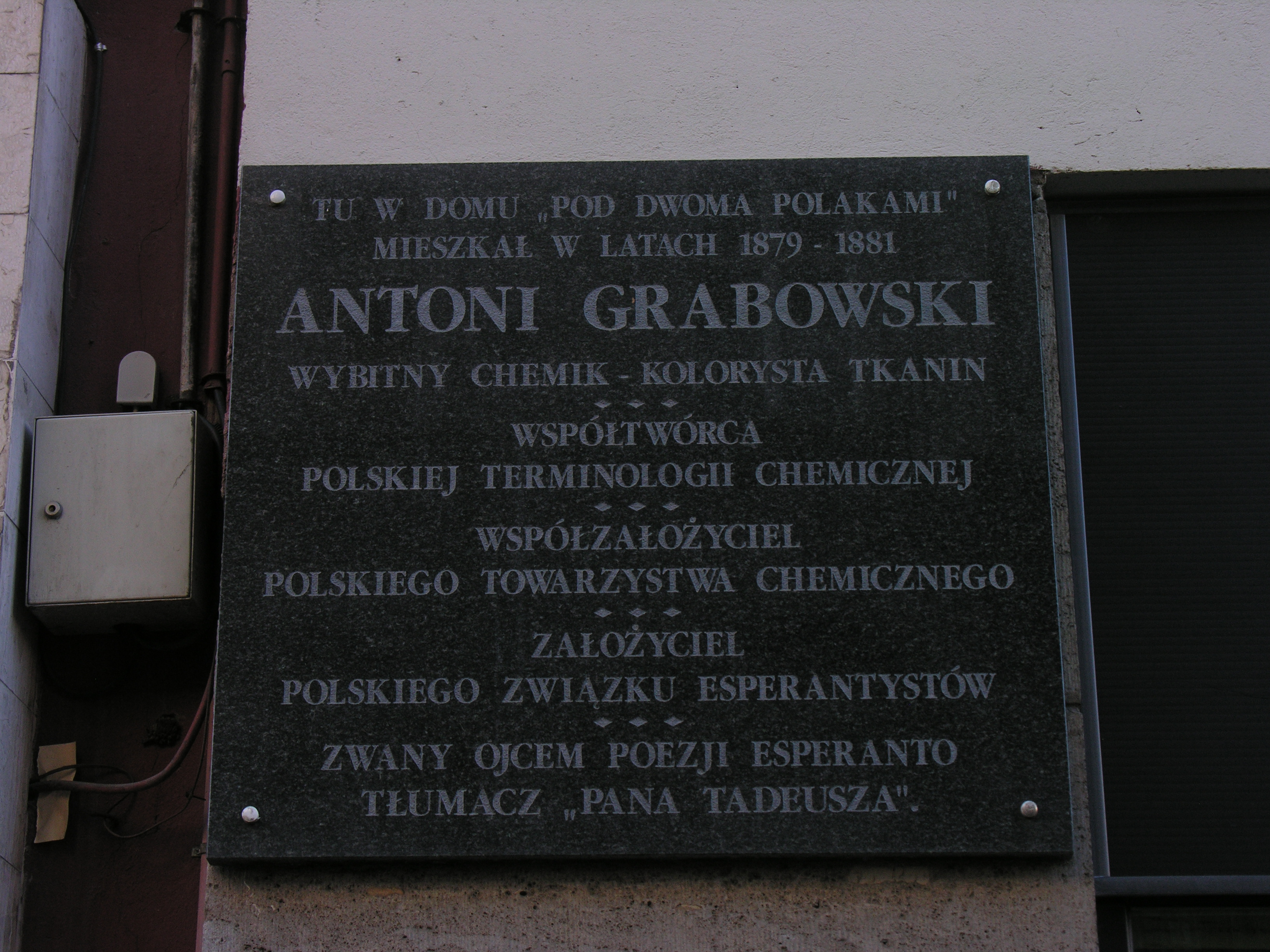
The plaque for Antoni Grabowski in Wrocław

== Esperanto and literature ==
In 1887 he studied the booklet Dr. Esperanto's International Language: Introduction & Complete Grammar, published in the same year by L. L. Zamenhof, which outlined Zamenhof's ambitious language project—soon to become known by the name Esperanto. Impressed by the transparent structure of Esperanto and by its capacity for expression which, he thought, could be picked up astonishingly quickly, Grabowski traveled to Warsaw to visit Zamenhof, where the two held the first oral conversation in Esperanto.

Like Zamenhof, Grabowski understood the important influence of literature on the development of languages, and especially for Esperanto, which by then was on the way to changing from a language project into a language which would be fully functional in all areas of life. Grabowski was already working on this: in 1888 he published La Neĝa Blovado, his translation of Pushkin's Russian short story Метель, known in English variously as The Blizzard and as The Snowstorm; followed in 1889 by La Gefratoj, his translation of Goethe's German one-act play Die Geschwister (1776), known in English both as Brother and Sister and as The Siblings — to name just his first two Esperanto publications.

During the early 1890s, Grabowski became unsatisfied by the slow spread of Esperanto. Believing that "imperfections" in the language were responsible for the slow pace, he pleaded for reform. In a vote among Esperantists that took place in 1894, however, he voted against changes to the language. For a number of years he worked on a planned language of his own he called "Modern Latin", advising his friend Edgar de Wahl during the early creation of his language Occidental to give up the search to find regularity in naturalistic auxiliary languages and join him on his purely naturalistic project instead. Not long after, however, he gave up on the idea and adhered to the basic principles of Esperanto as originally espoused by Zamenhof, the so-called Fundamento de Esperanto.

Grabowski was a longstanding president of the Warsaw Esperanto Society, founded in 1904, and of the Polish Esperanto Society, founded in 1908. In the same year he became director of the Grammar section of the Esperanto Academy. He published articles and gave lectures on Esperanto and organized Esperanto language courses.

In the years 1908–1914 Grabowski was in charge of the first Esperanto courses for a few schools in Warsaw. In an article in 1908 he described what he saw as the exceptional suitability of Esperanto as an introduction to language learning (see Propedeutic value of Esperanto), demonstrating with concrete examples the extent to which learning Esperanto as one's first foreign language would improve the learning of French and Latin, a claim which seemed inconceivable to the public of that time.

The anthology El Parnaso de Popoloj ("From The Parnassus Of The Peoples"), published in 1913, contained 116 poems representing 30 languages and cultures. Six of the poems were originally composed in Esperanto. The remaining 110 were translated into Esperanto from other languages.

World War I separated Grabowski from his family, who had fled to Russia. Ill and isolated, he remained behind in Warsaw, where he busied himself in translating the Polish national epic Pan Tadeusz by Adam Mickiewicz. While working on his translation, which was precisely faithful to the original form, he put the latent potential of the planned language to the test, thereby giving significant impetus to the further development of Esperanto poetry.

Suffering from a chronic heart condition but unable to afford the necessary medical treatment, he lived at that time in oppressive poverty, and when his family returned after the end of the war, his body had become almost emaciated. Nevertheless, he continued his work on Esperanto until his death in Warsaw, from a heart attack, in 1921.
