= Kálmán Kalocsay =

Hungarian Esperantist poet, translator and editor

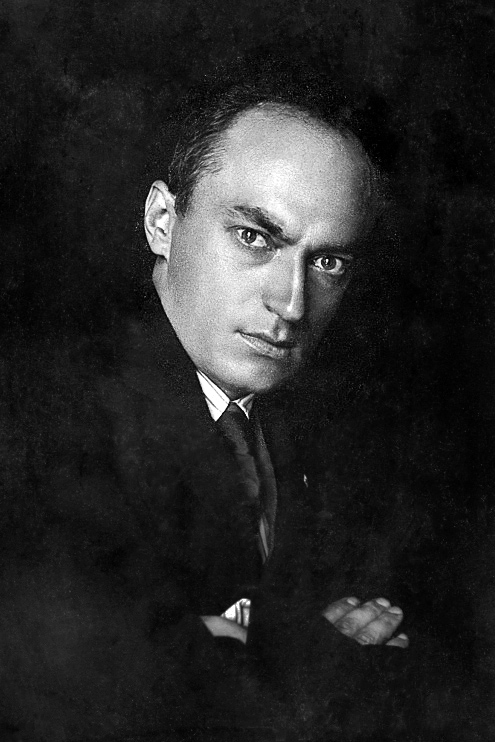
- Born: October 6, 1891; Abaújszántó
- Died: February 23, 1976 (aged 84); Budapest
- Education: University of Budapest (—1916, medicine)
- Occupations: Infectious disease specialist Poet; Translator Esperantist

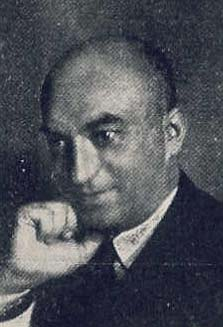
Kálmán Kalocsay

Kálmán Kalocsay (Hungarian pronunciation: [ˈkaːlmaːn ˈkɒlot͡ʃɒi]; 6 October 1891 in Abaújszántó – 27 February 1976) was a Hungarian Esperantist poet, translator, and editor who significantly influenced Esperanto culture, both in its literature and in the language itself, through his original poetry and his translations of literary works from his native Hungarian and other languages of Europe. His name is sometimes Esperantized as Kolomano Kaloĉajo, and some of his work was published under various pseudonyms, including C.E.R. Bumy, Kopar, Alex Kay, K. Stelov, Malice Pik and Peter Peneter.

Kalocsay studied medicine and later became a surgeon and the chief infectious disease specialist at a major Budapest hospital. He learned both Esperanto and its breakaway dialect Ido in his adolescence, but became more inclined towards Esperanto after he had seen its greater literary potential. In 1921 his first original collection of poems, Mondo kaj Koro (“World and heart”) was published. A further decade passed before the appearance of his collection Streĉita Kordo (“A taut string”), which many Esperantists consider one of the finest collections of original Esperanto poetry, and Rimportretoj (“Portraits in rhyme”), witty poems in rondel style about various people then prominent in the Esperanto movement. In 1932, under the pseudonym Peter Peneter, he published Sekretaj Sonetoj (“Secret sonnets”), a book of erotic verse.

In addition to being a prolific author of Esperanto works, Kalocsay guided the Esperanto literary world through a magazine and publishing house called Literatura Mondo (“Literary world”). A group of writers who coalesced around this magazine during the 1920s and 1930s were known as the "Budapest school" (Budapeŝta skolo).

Works of Kalocsay about literary and linguistic theory include the expansive Plena Gramatiko de Esperanto (“Complete grammar of Esperanto”) and Parnasa Gvidlibro (“Handbook of Parnassus”), a work on Esperanto poetics co-authored with Gaston Waringhien, and an academic style guide for Esperanto, Lingvo – Stilo – Formo (“Language, style and form”). Kalocsay also co-compiled the two-volume Enciklopedio de Esperanto (“Encyclopædia of Esperanto”).

Much was written about Kalocsay by his literary executor Ada Csiszár, after whose death the estate passed to the Esperanto Museum of the Austrian National Library.

== Works ==
=== Original poetry ===
- Dek elektitaj poemoj (Ten selected poems from Strecita Kordo-ból), 1976
- Dissemitaj floroj (Scattered flower seeds). Budapest, 2005
- Izolo (Isolation), 1977
- La dekdu noktoj de satano (The Twelve Nights of Satan), 1990
- Mondo kaj Koro (World and Heart), 1921
- Rimportretoj (Rhyme Portraits), 1934
- Streĉita Kordo (A Taut String), 1931, 1978
- Sekretaj Sonetoj (Secret Sonnets), 1932, 1989
- Versojn oni ne aĉetas (Verses one does not buy), 1992

=== Translations into Esperanto ===
- Arthistorio I. (Art history notes, following the lectures of Antal Hekler, Part I: The art of ancient peoples) – Prose, 1934
- Du kokcineloj (Géza Gárdonyi: Two Ladybugs) – Prose, 1923
- Eterna Bukedo (Eternal bouquet) – Poetry anthology, 1931
- Ezopa saĝo (Aesopian wisdom), 1956, 1978
- Hungara Antologio (Hungarian anthology), 1933, 1983
- Infero (Dante Alighieri: Inferno), 1933, 1979
- Johano la Brava (Petőfi Sándor: János vitéz), 1923, 1948, 1984, graphic novel 2001
- Kantanta kamparo (Éneklő mező - népdalok), 1922
- Kantoj kaj Romancoj (Heinrich Heine: Dalok és románcok), together with Gaston Waringhien, 1969
- La Floroj de l'Malbono (Charles Baudelaire: Les Fleurs du mal) (joint translation), 1957
- La Tempesto (William Shakespeare: The Tempest), 1970
- La Taglibro (Goethe: The Diary), 1984
- La Tragedio de l'Homo (Madách: Az ember tragédiája), 1924 (revised: 1965), CD version: 1999
- Libero kaj Amo (Petőfi Sándor: Szabadság, szerelem), 1970
- Morgaŭ matene (Frigyes Karinthy: Holnap reggel) – Prose, 1923
- Ni kantu! (Énekeljünk), 1928, 2000
- Reĝo Lear (Shakespeare: King Lear), 1966
- Romaj Elegioj, La Taglibro (Goethe: Roman Elegy, The Diary), 1932
- Rozinjo (Gyula Török: Rozika) – Play, 1938, 1977
- Somermeznokta Sonĝo (Shakespeare: A Midsummer Night's Dream), 1967
- Tutmonda Sonoro (Sounding World, an anthology translated from 30 languages in two volumes), 1981
- Vivo de Arnaldo (Benito Mussolini: Vita di Arnaldo) – Prose, 1934

=== Edited by Kalocsay ===
- Dekdu Poetoj (Twelve Poets), 1934
- Naŭ poetoj (Nine poets), 1938, 1989
- Enciklopedio de Esperanto / red. L. Kökény, V. Bleier ; la lingvo-fakon K. Kalocsay ; iniciatinto-cefredaktoro I. Sirjaev. Budapest : Literatura Mondo, 1933.

=== Linguistics and prose works ===
- 8000 frazeologiaj esprimoj (8000 phraseological expressions, together with Ada Csiszár), 2003
- Dek prelegoj (Ten lectures), 1985
- Diino Hertha (Goddess Hertha), 1992
- Domfabriko (House Factory, 6000 phrases in Hungarian-Esperanto, together with Ada Csiszár), 1975
- Eszperantó nyelvtan (Esperanto grammar), 1948
- Kiel verki kaj traduki (How to write and translate), 1979
- La gramatika karaktero de esperantaj radikoj (Grammatical characteristics of Esperanto word roots), 1938, 1980
- Lingvo Stilo Formo (Language Style Form) – Study, 1931, 1963, 1970
- Parnasa Gvidlibro, (Guide to Parnassus, jointly with Gaston Waringhien), 1932, 1968, 1984
- Plena gramatiko, (Complete grammar), 1935, 1938, 1958-1964
- Rendszeres eszperantó nyelvtan (Regular Esperanto Grammar), 1966, 1968, 2004
- Selektitaj leteroj (Selected letters) Budapest, 2006
- Sendemandaj respondoj (Questionless answers), Sezonoj, 1992
- Vojaĝo inter la tempoj, (Journey between times) – linguistics, Stafeto 1966;

=== Translations into other languages ===
- Ezopa saĝo (Aesopian wisdom); into Chinese, 1980
- En nacia vesto (In national dress); into 19 languages, Budapest, 2004
- Johano la Brava (John the Brave); Chinese–Esperanto parallel text, 1997

== See also ==
- Julio Baghy
