= Baldur Ragnarsson =

Icelandic poet (1930–2018)

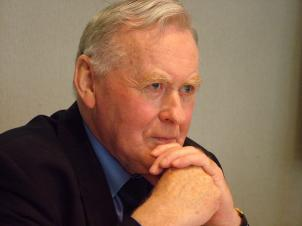
- Baldur in 2005
- Born: 25 August 1930; Iceland
- Died: 25 December 2018 (aged 88)
- Occupations: novelist, short story writer, essayist, journalist
- Writing career
- Language: Esperanto; Icelandic
- Period: 1958–2018
- Genres: Poetry, Essays
- Notable work: La lingvo serena

Baldur Ragnarsson (25 August 1930 – 25 December 2018) was an Icelandic poet and author of Esperanto works. He was a teacher and a superintendent of schools in Iceland.

== Esperanto ==
Baldur learned Esperanto at school in 1949 and was active in the movement to promote the use of this language since 1952. He was president of the Icelandic Esperanto Association for many years. He presided over the World Esperanto Association's literary contest from 1975 to 1985. He was president of the organizing committee for the 1977 World Esperanto Congress at Reykjavík and vice-president of the World Esperanto Association in charge of culture and education from 1980 to 1986. He was thereafter an honorary member of this organization.

He was editor of the journal Norda Prismo from 1958 to 1974, and became a member of the Akademio de Esperanto (Esperanto Academy) in 1979,

In 2007 the Association of Esperanto-speaking authors (Esperantlingva Verkista Asocio) nominated him as their candidate for the Nobel Prize in Literature following the death of William Auld in 2006.

== Works ==
Baldur composed poetic works in Icelandic as well as books on the Icelandic language. He was also written two collections of Esperanto poems: Ŝtupoj sen nomo and Esploroj.

In 2007 Edistudio published La lingvo serena, his complete works. In addition to the poems of his two previous collections, the book contains all the poems he was published subsequently, as well as all the essays he has written on literature and linguistics. All subsequent poetry books (2008 to 2016) were published by Mondial in New York.

Poetry

- Ŝtupoj sen Nomo, 1959
- Esploroj, 1974
- "Deflorazione" and "Malvirgigo" in El la nova ĝardeno (Dal nuovo giardino), Dante Bertolini, ed., Pedrazzini: Locarno, 1979, 100 pp.
- La lingvo serena, 2007
- La neceso akceptebla, 2008
- La fontoj nevideblaj, 2010
- Laŭ neplanitaj padoj, 2013
- Momentoj kaj meditoj, 2016

Translations into Esperanto

- Sub stelo rigida, two collections by the Icelandic poet Þorsteinn frá Hamri, 1963
- Islandaj pravoĉoj, three tales and a poem from Old Icelandic literature, 1964
- Sagao de Njal, Njáls saga, the greatest of the Icelandic sagas, 2003
- Sendependaj homoj, Halldór Laxness's Independent People, a novel about rural Iceland at the turn of the 20th century, 2007
- La Edda de Snorri Sturluson, Snorri Sturluson's Prose Edda, 2008
- Vundebla loko (Translation of poems by the award-winning Icelandic author Gerður Kristný), 2009
- Sagao de la Volsungoj - kaj ĝiaj fontoj ("Saga of the Völsungs - and its sources", translation of the most famous of the legendary sagas, the theme of which is the Old Norse-Germanic mythological heroes) 2011
- Sagao de Egil (Translation of Egil's Saga, one of the 40 so-called Sagas of Icelanders) 2011

In addition, he has published dozens of translations in various journals, in recent times principally in the journal La tradukisto (in Esperanto).

Essays

- La Sagaoj kaj Zamenhof: stabiligaj faktoroj 1982
- Studado de alia lingvo 1982
- "Esperanto kiel anti-lingvo" in Serta gratulatoria in honorem Juan Régulo. Universidad de La Laguna, Salamanca, 3,266 pp., 1986 ISBN 84-600-4290-1
- La proza poemo: la ĝenro, ĝiaj latentoj kaj aplikoj 1987
- La Poezia Arto (Five lectures) 1988
- Cent jaroj de poezio en Esperanto 1989
- La poezio de la skaldoj
- La poemoj de Armand Su 1993
- Kombino de poeta virtuozeco kaj ties instrumento 1994
- Tradukante la antikvan islandan literaturon en Esperanto 1998
- "La fono kaj la fronto: kelkaj konsideroj pri semiotikaj aspektoj de la Esperanta poezio" in Lingva arto. Vilmos Benczik, ed., Universala Esperanto-Asocio, Rotterdam: 1999, 217 pp. ISBN 92-9017-064-6
- La lingvo serena 2007
- Tungumál Veraldar 2009

== See also ==
- Þórbergur Þórðarson
- List of Icelandic writers
- Icelandic literature
