= Victor Sadler =

British-born Dutch Esperantist (1937–2020)

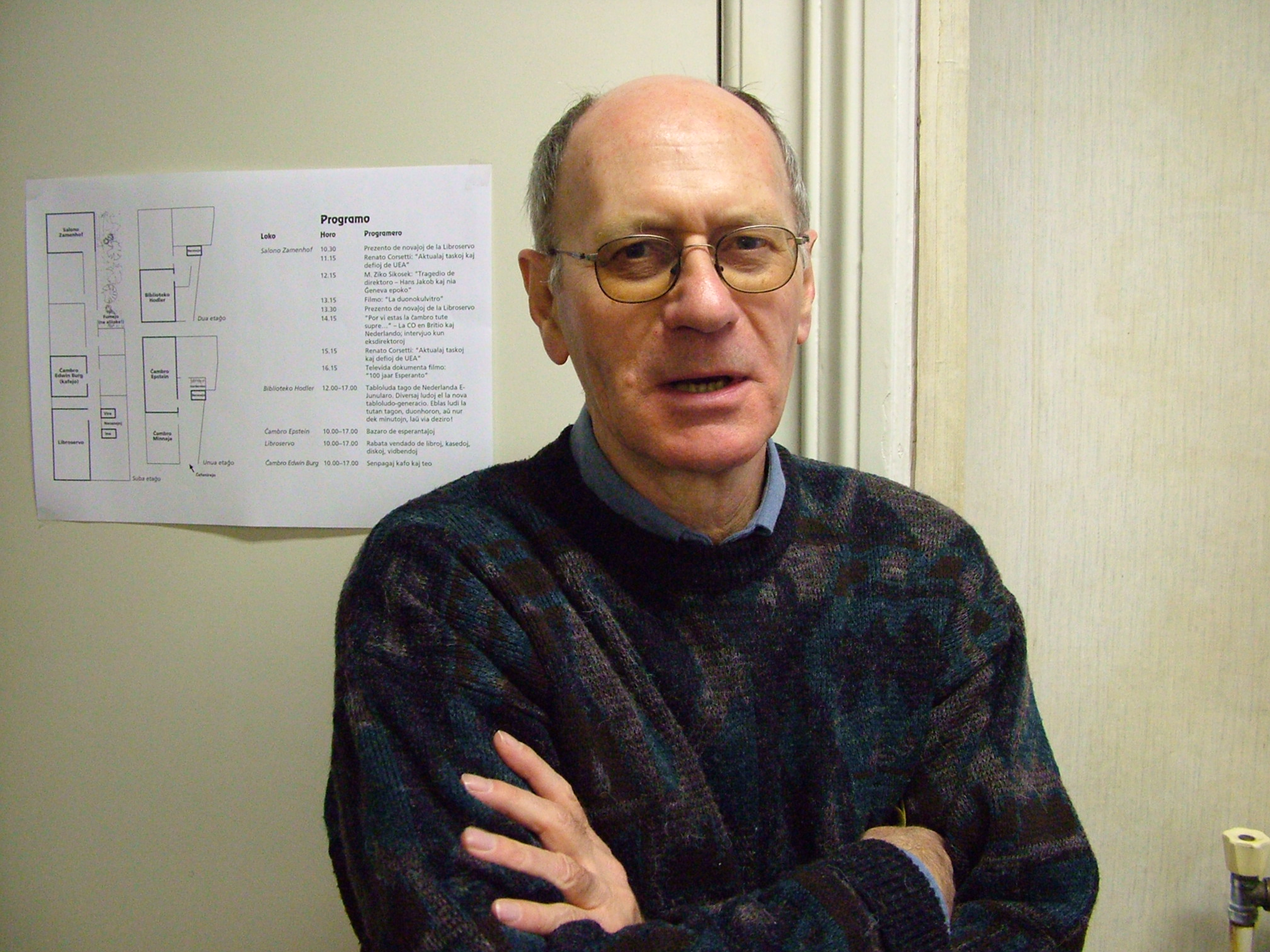

Victor Sadler (1937–2020) was a British-born Dutch Esperantist.

== Sadler and Esperanto ==
Victor Sadler attended Northampton Grammar School, and learnt Esperanto when he was 14, in 1951. He studied experimental psychology as an undergraduate at Pembroke College, Cambridge, followed by a PhD entitled Vocal reproduction of the duration, intensity and fundamental frequency of synthetic speech sounds from University College London in 1962.

At the end of that year he started working at the central office of the World Esperanto Association (UEA), in Rotterdam (Netherlands), where he helped edit the magazine Esperanto. He also served as redactor of Monda Kulturo, during the short lifespan of this other periodical, and he looked after the Hector Hodler library, which is still nowadays one of the richest Esperanto libraries in the world.

In 1968, he followed Marianne H. Vermaas as the General Director of the World Esperanto Association. Akiko Uxusink-Nagata helped him edit the magazine La Monda Lingvo-Problemo until 1970; in 1974 the task was definitively taken over by a new editor, Simo Milojeviĉ. In this period, Sadler also cared after the organization of several World Congresses of Esperanto, before resigning in 1983. Two years later, he joined the Distributed Language Translation project in 1985 with responsibility for development of interlingual (Esperanto) lexicography in general and English-Esperanto lexicography in particular.

In 1986 he was elected a member of the steering council of UEA, responsible for finances; nevertheless he had to resign in March 1987 because of health reasons. Sadler also served as a member of the Esperanto Academy, the organization which groups the most prominent Esperanto linguists and cares after the evolution of the language.

Sadler wrote literary works in Esperanto as well; in 1968 he received the award Arĝenta Sprono thanks to his collection of poems Memkritiko ("selfcriticism"), although the preface to the work says that it was originally a manuscript that he found in the library.
