= Zamenhof (surname) =

Zamenhof is a Polish-Jewish surname. Notable people with the surname include:

- L. L. Zamenhof (1859–1917), Polish ophthalmologist, philologist, and the inventor of Esperanto
- Mark Zamenhof (1837–1907), L.L.'s father
- Klara Zamenhof (1863–1924), L.L.'s wife
- Adam Zamenhof (1888–1940), Polish ophthalmologist, the son of L. L. Zamenhof
- Lidia Zamenhof (1904–1942), Polish Esperantist, daughter of L. L. Zamenhof
- Zofia Zamenhof (1889–1942), Polish pediatrician, daughter of L.L. Zamenhof
- Louis-Christophe Zaleski-Zamenhof (1925–2019), son of Adam Zamenhof
