= 1912 World Esperanto Congress =

VIII World Esperanto Congress in Kraków

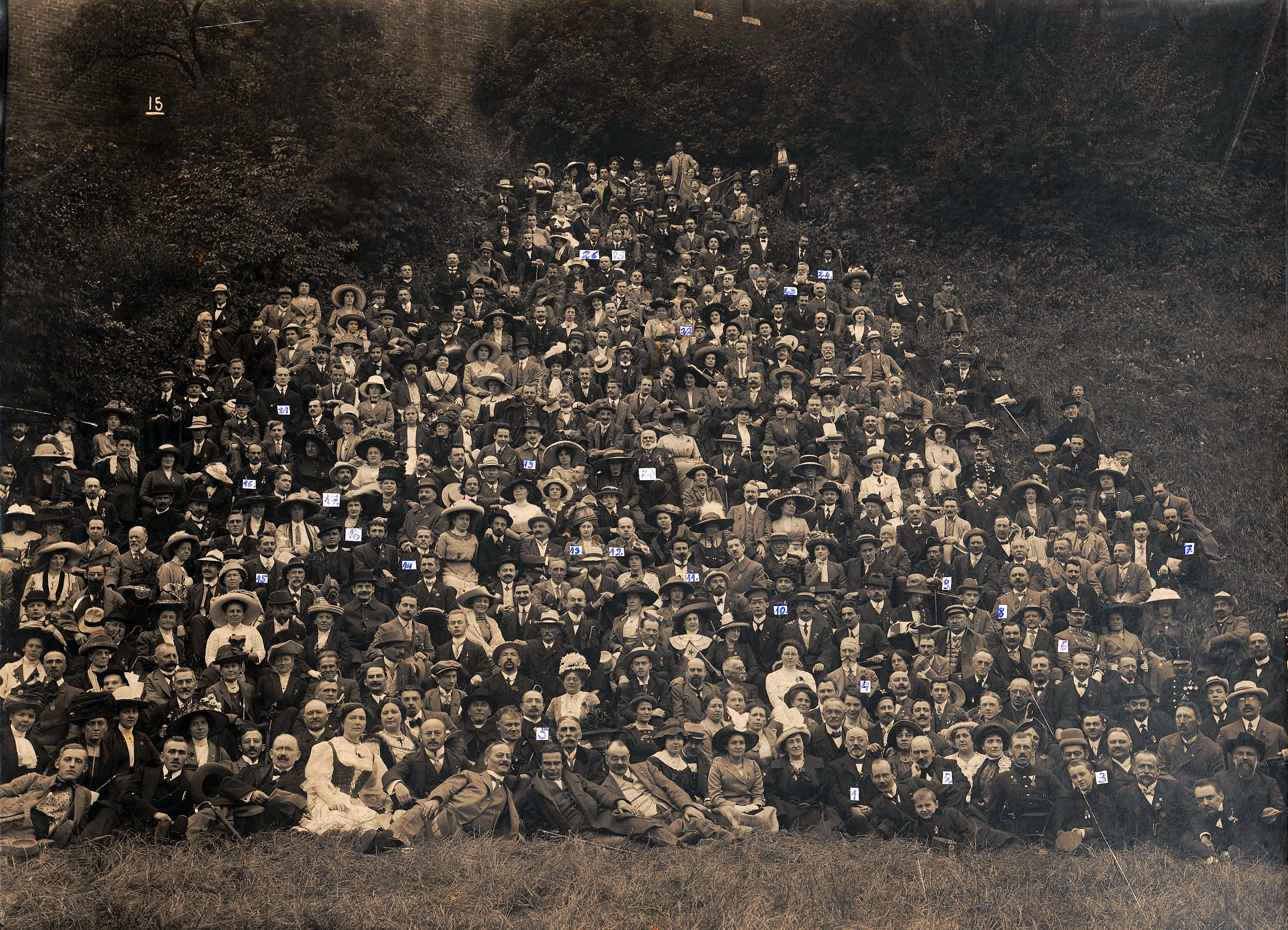
- Date: August 11–18, 1912
- Location: Kraków
- Participants: around 1000 people

The VIII World Esperanto Congress in 1912 was organized on the 25th anniversary of the publication of the first textbook for learning Esperanto. It took place in Kraków from August 11 to 18, 1912. Ludwik Zamenhof, who participated in it, declared during the opening that he was resigning from the leadership of the movement and would attend the next congress as an ordinary Esperantist. The congress was attended by Esperantists from Europe, Asia, and America. The proceedings took place within 28 sections and plenary meetings. As part of the congress, accompanying events were organized, such as performances, lectures, excursions (to Wieliczka and Zakopane), and competitions. An exhibition of Esperanto publications was prepared in the building of the Academy of Commerce, and the opening and closing of the congress, plenary sessions, and a ball took place in the halls of the Helena Modrzejewska National Old Theatre, during which participants presented themselves in national costumes.

== Preparations ==
Preparations for the congress began in early 1912. The Kraków City Council allocated a subsidy of 3000 crowns for the organization and allowed the use of the Old Theatre hall. An Illustrated Guide to Kraków in Esperanto was published. On August 8, the fire brigade began decorating the city. In front of the Academy of Commerce and the industrial exhibition, masts were erected to display flags and banners, with green garlands hung between them. The Josephite Workshop was responsible for their preparation and for decorating the interiors of the academy and the Old Theatre.

== Organization ==
The organization was led by a committee chaired by Odo Bujwid, with its headquarters at 19 Radziwiłłowska Street. The congress proceedings took place in the Old Theatre hall, while the press facilities, press office, section meetings, and exhibition were located at the Academy of Commerce on Kapucyńska Street. Meetings of 28 sections were planned (including those for doctors, postcard collectors, teachers, Catholics, etc.). Working and plenary sessions (four in total) of the Universal Esperanto Association (Esperanto: Universala Esperanto-Asocio) were to be held in the Old Theatre hall. The press office of the congress was managed by editor Jerzy Grzywiński. Bank Krajowy opened a currency exchange office on the ground floor, where participants could exchange money. Congress attendees were entitled to free tram transportation upon showing their congress card.

The congress newspaper, Kongresa Bulteno, was published daily as a supplement to the Ilustrowany Kuryer Codzienny. The first issue featured a portrait of Zamenhof, information about Poland and Kraków, a telegram section for messages related to the congress, and an information section. Additionally, the Kraków-based Goniec Poniedziałkowy published a supplement dedicated to the congress, titled Lunda Kuriero.

=== Participation card and badges ===
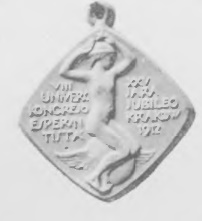
Badge minted for congress participants

The cost of participation in the congress was set at 14.40 crowns. As proof of payment, participants received a congress card and congress badges. These were bronze plaques, one-sided, designed by sculptor Henryk Kunzek. They were hung on ribbons: Kraków Esperantists on white-blue, Polish Esperantists on white-amaranth, and others on green. They had a quadrangular shape with a loop, on which a "naked woman sitting on a winged globe; hands raised above the head reaching for a five-pointed star" was depicted. The inscription VIII UNIWERS KONGRESO ESPERANTISTA = XXV JARA JUBILEO KRAKOW 1912 was placed on the sides. In October, Wiadomości Numizmatyczno-Archeologiczne reported that all badges, minted in several thousand copies, were distributed among the congress participants.

The congress fee entitled participants to:

- Free admission to the congress opening, plenary sessions, and section meetings;
- free admission to the jubilee evening, cabaret performances at the architectural exhibition, and the ball;
- receiving congress publications, including an illustrated congress book, illustrated guides to Kraków and Zakopane, a Kraków views album, and others;
- free admission to all Kraków museums;
- free tram rides;
- discount for a trip to Wieliczka (4 crowns);
- discounted admission to the architectural exhibition (1 crown);
- 50% discount on tickets to the painting exhibition at the Palace of Art and at the Spiski Palace. The Palace of Art on Szczepański Square issued a catalog in Esperanto for the congress.

== History ==
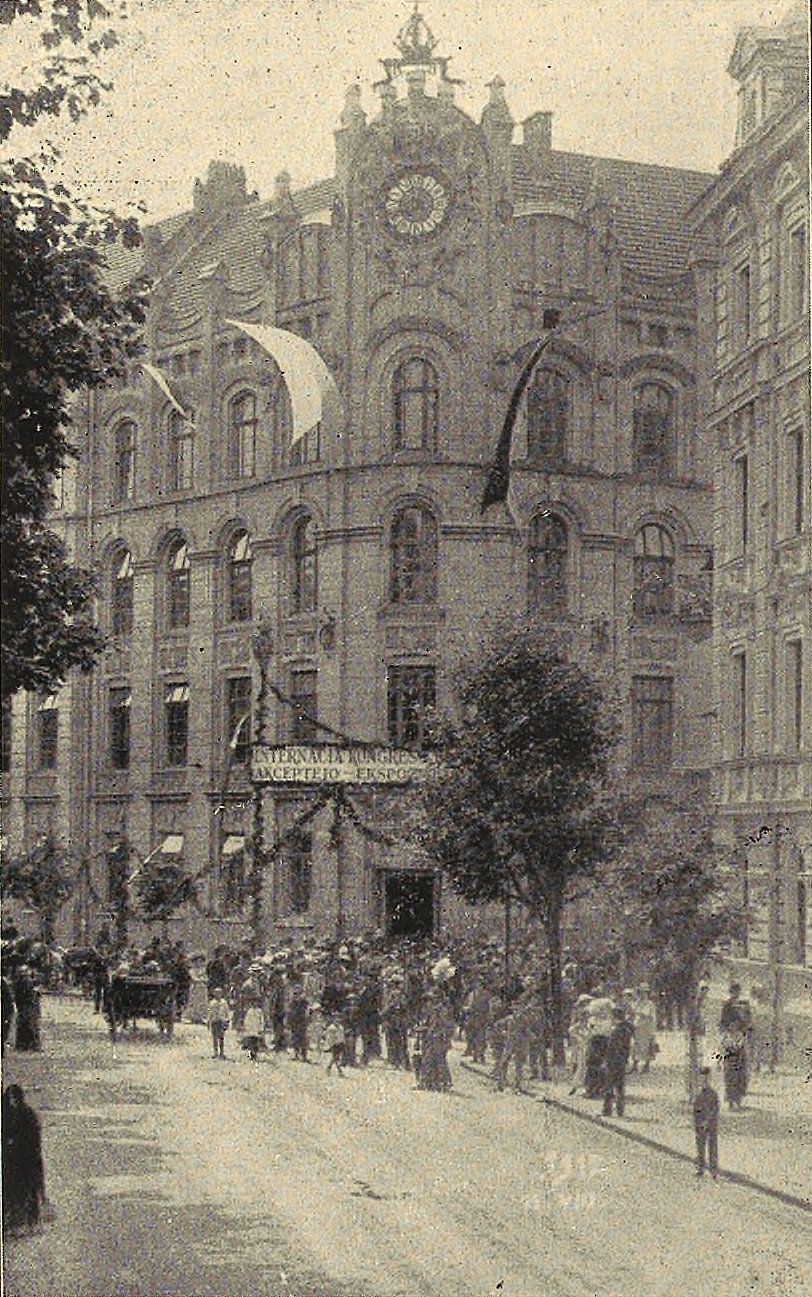
Building of the Academy of Commerce in Kraków during the congress

On the evening of 9 August 1912, Ludwik Zamenhof arrived in Kraków by train from Warsaw together with his wife. At the railway station, he was welcomed by the Congress Committee, led by Odo Bujwid. Accompanying him were the congress attendees: Carlo Bourlet, Gabriel Chavet, Frenckell, and S. Winkelman from Dresden. On Saturday evening, a cabaret performance in Esperanto took place at the Teatr Nowości. It consisted of a one-act play, a cabaret performance by theater actors, and a performance by an amateur Esperantist from Kraków, Kriss, with a monologue of a Chinese character. On the day of the congress opening, August 11, at 1:00 PM, the city authorities invited attendees to a lavish breakfast at the restaurant of the Old Theater. About a thousand people, including Ludwik Zamenhof and delegates representing 33 nations of the congress members, participated in it.

=== Beginning of the congress ===
Before the congress proceedings began, participants from different countries met to choose a representative who would speak on their behalf at the ceremonial opening of the congress. Poles from the three partitions were entitled to choose three individuals, but at the suggestion of Dr. Skałkowski from Warsaw, it was decided to select one representative. The choice was to emphasize the unity of Poles from the three partitions. Antoni Grabowski was chosen.

In the afternoon of August 11th, at 3:00 PM, the delegates gathered in the hall of the Old Theater for the solemn inauguration of the proceedings. The hall was decorated with flags and the city's coat of arms. Seated at the presidium table alongside Ludwik Zamenhof were Odo Bujwid, Carlo Bourlet, Antoni Grabowski, Kraków's vice mayors Henryk Szarski and Józef Sare, starosta Władysław Kowalikowski, Father Giesswein, and city councilors. Carlo Bourlet opened the proceedings and proposed the election of the congress authorities. Szczepan Mikołajski was elected chairman, with H. Bolingbroke Mudie from England, Engineer Rollet de L'Isle from France, Arnold Behrendt from Germany, A. Niedoszywin from Russia, and A. Grabowski from Poland as vice presidents. Secretaries were appointed: Chavet from France and Dr. Leon Rosenstock serving as congress secretary.

President Szarski welcomed the guests, reading a pre-prepared text in Esperanto. He thanked for choosing Kraków as the meeting place for Esperantists. Jan Kanty Federowicz spoke on behalf of the Chamber of Commerce, followed by the chairman of the organizing committee Odo Bujwid, who spoke about the relationship between Esperanto and patriotism. Finally, Ludwik Zamenhof took the floor. He mentioned deceased Esperantists and announced that he believed his work had already matured. Therefore, during his speech, he declared that for the last time he stands before the congress as a leader and director of the movement, and if he comes to future congresses, his place will not be on the stage, but among the rank and file. Secretary Chavet read greetings and telegrams from around the world. Representatives of governments then spoke, followed by representatives of the national groups gathered at the congress: Americans, Ukrainians, Croats, Belgians, Bulgarians, English, Scots, Irish, Welsh, Danes, Finns, French, Germans, Italians, Poles, Japanese, Mexicans, Norwegians, Serbs, and Swedes. In the name of the Spaniards, four delegates spoke because separate speeches were addressed to the congress by representatives of Catalans, Basques, and Castilians. The final item on the agenda was a resolution to send telegrams to Emperor Franz Joseph I of Austria (Kraków was part of Austria-Hungary) and Queen Elisabeth of Wied. In the evening, a reception was held in honor of Zamenhof in the hall of the Kraków Rifle Society.

=== Jubilee evening ===
On August 12th, a concert was scheduled to celebrate the 25th anniversary of the Esperanto movement and in honor of Ludwik Zamenhof. The concert featured performances by Ada Sari, actors Stanisława Wysocka and Wiktor Biegański, a men's choir composed of members of the former Musical Society, and Lutnia. Wiktor Barabasz conducted the event. Additionally, the orchestra of the 100th Infantry Regiment, led by conductor Sitter, performed.

=== August 15th ===
On August 15th, participants of the congress took part in religious services: Catholics at St. Mary's Basilica, where the service was conducted by Canon Giesswein and the sermon delivered by Father Szurek. Protestants prayed in the Protestant church, where the sermon was given by Pastor Michejda. Jews prayed at the synagogue on Miodowa Street, where the sermon was delivered by Rabbi Saphra from Annaberg-Buchholz. After laying wreaths at the monuments of Adam Mickiewicz and Nicolaus Copernicus, participants went to the architectural exhibition area, where photos were taken, and awards were given in literary competitions. In the evening, a ball took place. It began with Odo Bujwid leading the polonaise with Mrs. Zamenhof. The festivities lasted until 4:00 AM.

=== Congress proceedings and conclusion ===
During the plenary session on August 16th, a decision was made regarding the locations for the next congresses. The next one in 1913 was to be held in Genoa, and the following year in Paris. Delegates from various countries extended invitations to host future congresses. Thanks were conveyed to the Ministry of Education in China for establishing an Esperanto school in Beijing and for promoting the language in China. In the evening, participants could listen to Halka in Esperanto.

The closing ceremonies of the congress began with a tribute to the late Johann Martin Schleyer, the creator of the Volapük language. Speakers highlighted the good organization, and Glück from Vienna presented an album with the signatures of all the attendees to the congress. After expressions of gratitude from the organizers, La Espero anthem was sung, and with chants of "See you in Genoa", the proceedings were closed. After the congress ended, a delegation including President Mikołajski, Zamenhof, Bourlet, and Bujwid visited Vice Mayor Szarski to thank the city council of Kraków for the warm reception of the congress members. In Pola Esperantisto, Leo Belmont summarized the congress and its organization by writing, Kraków set an example in organizing the congress.

== Ball ==
Traditionally, during the congress, its participants gather at a ball. They wear national costumes that showcase the culture of each nation represented at the congress. 90 people could watch the ball from the gallery after purchasing special tickets priced from 11 to 6 crowns.

== Tribute to Mickiewicz, Copernicus and Kościuszko ==
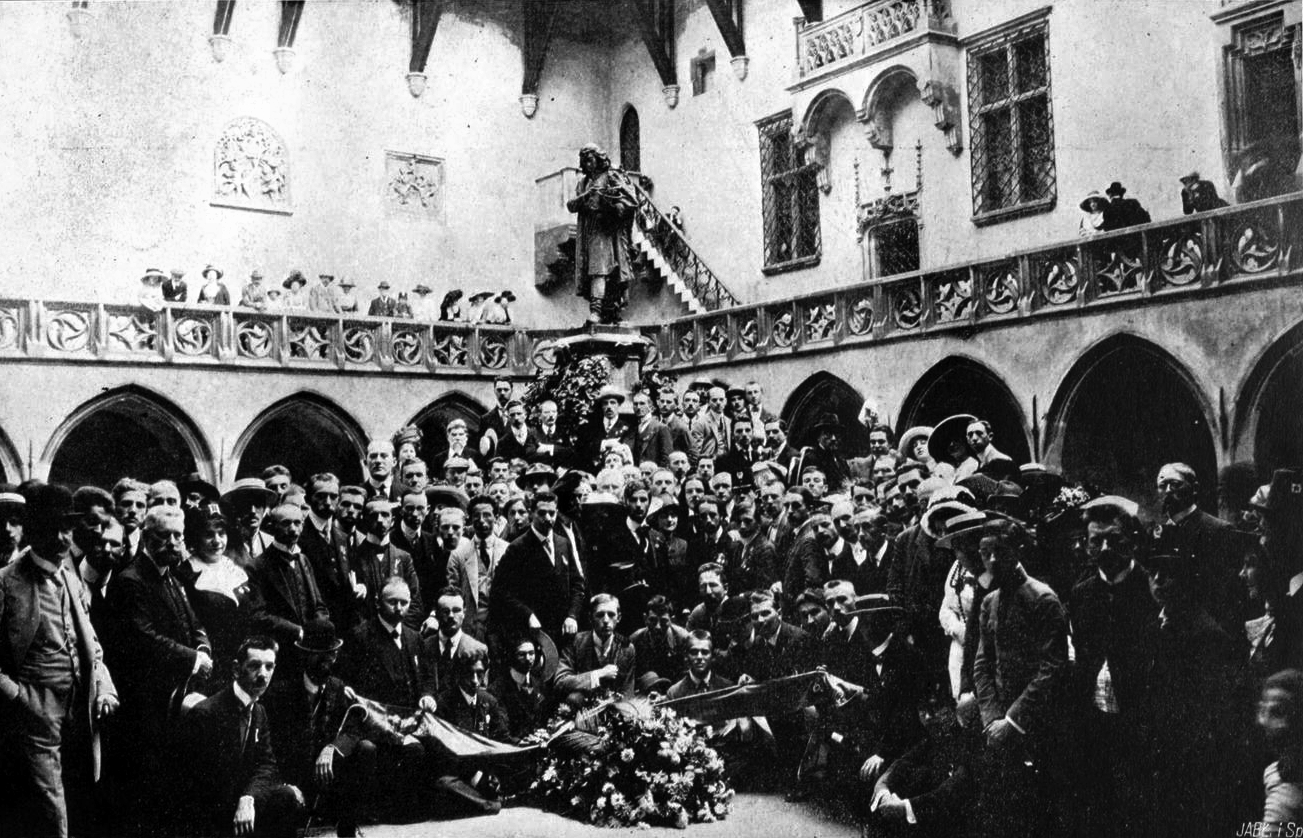
Congress participants in the courtyard of the Jagiellonian Library under the statue of Copernicus

On August 15th at 12 o'clock, all Esperantists gathered at the Adam Mickiewicz monument. A wreath with green ribbons was laid, bearing the inscription: A la granda homarano – VIII Kongreso Esperantista, which in Szczepan Mikołajski's translation can be rendered as: Homage is paid to the great man, belonging to all humanity, the VIII Esperanto Congress. After laying the wreath, Holder from Geneva explained in his speech that thanks to translations into Esperanto, those who know this language can appreciate not only Mickiewicz but also other Polish writers such as Juliusz Słowacki, Eliza Orzeszkowa, Maria Konopnicka, or Bolesław Prus, even though their works are often not translated into the national languages of the participants.

In the afternoon, a wreath was laid at the then-standing Nicolaus Copernicus Monument in the courtyard of Collegium Maius. The speech was delivered by Professor Carlo Bourlet from Paris.

On August 17th in the afternoon, Americans who arrived at the congress laid a wreath and a flag at the Tadeusz Kościuszko plaque on the Main Square.

== Exhibition ==
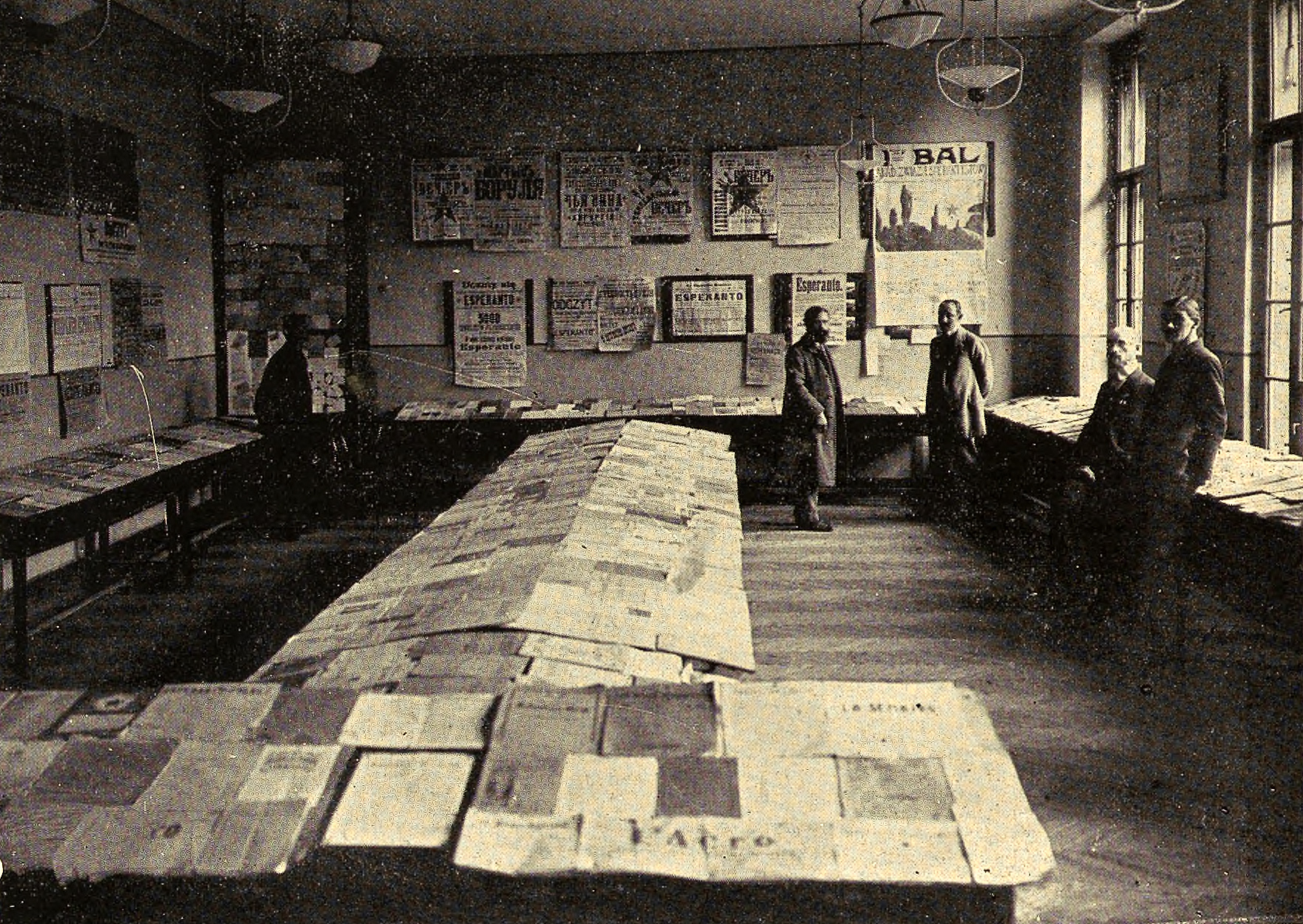
Exhibition held at the Academy of Commerce

The collections presented at the exhibition came from two sources. Part of them was received from publishers by the organizers, and the other part was purchased by the organizing committee from the Warsaw antiquarian and librarian, Aleksander Brzostowski. It included the first Esperanto textbooks from 1887 in Polish, Russian, German, French, and English, catalogs, propaganda brochures, and more. Brzostowski's collection was supplemented in 1910 when he organized an exhibition of Esperanto publications in Warsaw and received many publications from publishers.

The exhibition was opened on August 9th on the third floor of the building. All the collections were placed in 5 rooms, dividing the gathered materials into four sections: propaganda publications, historical materials, literature, and business publications. The fifth room housed a bookstore. Almost all the books available there were sold. The aim of the exhibition was to show the development of the Esperanto language over the course of 25 years of its existence. The cost of admission for non-participants of the congress was 20 hellers. Over the course of several days, it was visited by around 1,700 people (in addition to the participants). The collections gathered there remained in Kraków and were intended to become the nucleus of a museum.

== Photographs ==
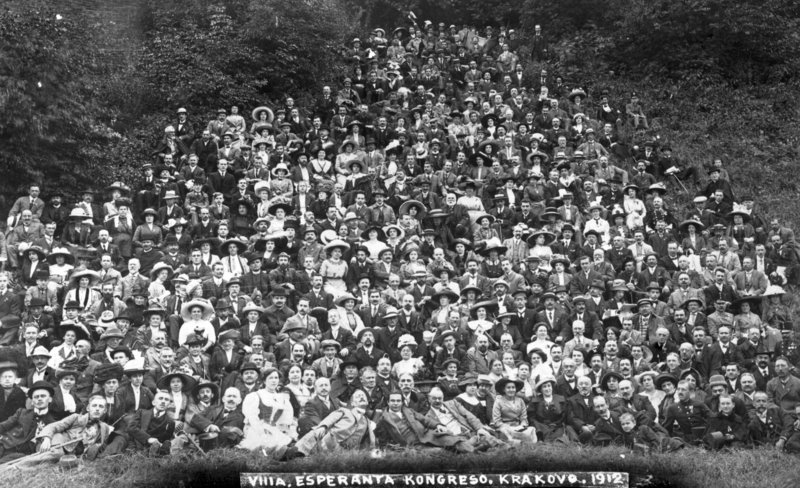
Group photograph of participants in the Eighth World Esperanto Congress in Kraków in 1912

A group photograph of all the participants of the congress was taken on August 12th under the Kościuszko Mound. Ludwik Zamenhof sits in the center, surrounded by members of his family and other Esperantists: his wife Klara, daughter Zofia Zamenhof, brother Leon Zamenhof, as well as non-family members including the publicist and poet Leo Belmont and Leon Rosenstock, who served as the secretary during the congress. The photograph was taken by two photographers: Edward Pierzchalski from Kraków and Władysław Gargul from Bochnia. Information about the photograph can be found on the website of the Historical Museum of Kraków.

They were not the only photographers at the congress; the Scottish Esperantist John Mabon Warden also took photographs. In 2019, the Zamenhof Center in Białystok, through the Polish Cultural Institute in London, received glass negatives taken during the congress from Billy Chapman.

== Accompanying events ==
=== Excursion to Wieliczka ===
On August 13th, participants embarked on an excursion to Wieliczka, traveling in two trains. They were welcomed at the station by Mayor Franciszek Aywas. The purpose of the trip was to visit the salt mine. A total of 1,200 people participated in the excursion.

=== Lecture on garden cities ===
On August 14th, within the premises of the architectural exhibition opened in Kraków in 1912, adjacent to the Jordan Park, English architect Ebenezer Howard delivered a lecture in Esperanto titled On the Development of Garden Cities. The lecture was translated into Polish.

=== Performances ===
In the evening of August 14th, the play Mazepa translated into Esperanto by Antoni Grabowski was staged at the theater. The performers included Józef Węgrzyn and Stanisława Wysocka.

On August 16th, the premiere of Stanisław Moniuszko's Halka in Esperanto was performed by the Lviv Theatre of Opera and Ballet. The libretto was translated by Włodzimierz Wolski, and the orchestra was conducted by Bronisław Wolfsthal. The main roles were played by Józef Munclinger (as the Stolnik), Stefania Marynowiczówna (as Zofia), Leonia Ogrodzka (as Halka), and Adam Okoński (as Janusz).

=== Competitions ===
Literary competitions were announced before the congress. The award ceremony took place on August 15th at the architectural exhibition. The winners were: for fiction – Adela Schafer from London and Kurt Sommer, for poetry – Vasilij Devjatnin from Paris, for scientific works – Maurice Fréchet and Hugo Dreusicke.

== Excursion to Zakopane ==
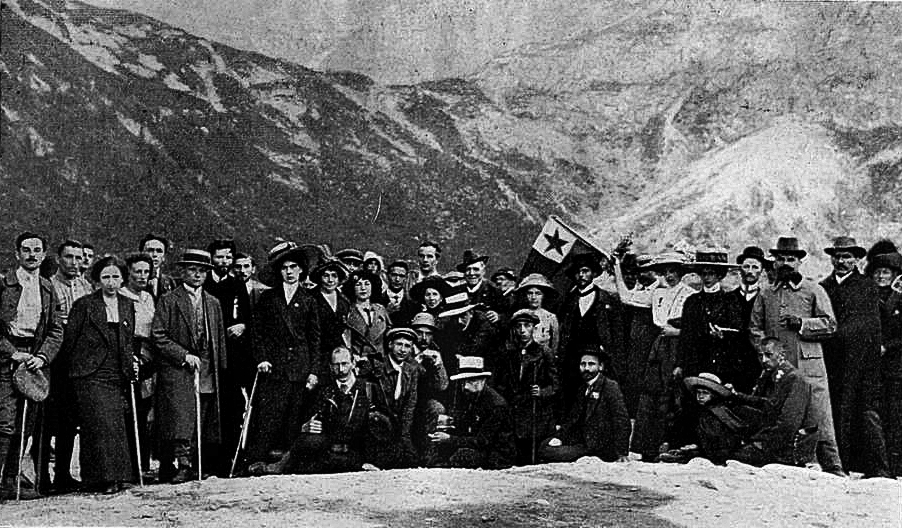
Excursion to Zakopane. Participants at the Morskie Oko lake

The day after the congress ended, around 100 participants, mainly from England and France, traveled by train on an excursion to Zakopane. The following day, three Esperantists set out on foot to Zakopane, among them Michel Rifaat Romano from Turkey, who had previously arrived in Kraków from Paris with Vasilij Devjatnin.

The participants of the excursion, including Zamenhof and Bujwid, traveled by carriage to the Strążyska Valley after lunch. In the evening, they attended a reception hosted by the marshal of Nowy Targ County, Dr. Andrzej Chramiec. On Monday morning, the guests went to the Kościeliska Valley and then visited Dr. Kazimierz Dłuski's sanatorium. After lunch at the Morskie Oko hotel, they visited the Tatra Museum, Kuźnice, and the Jaworzynka Valley.
