= Jane Baird =

Scottish Esperantist (1875–1960)

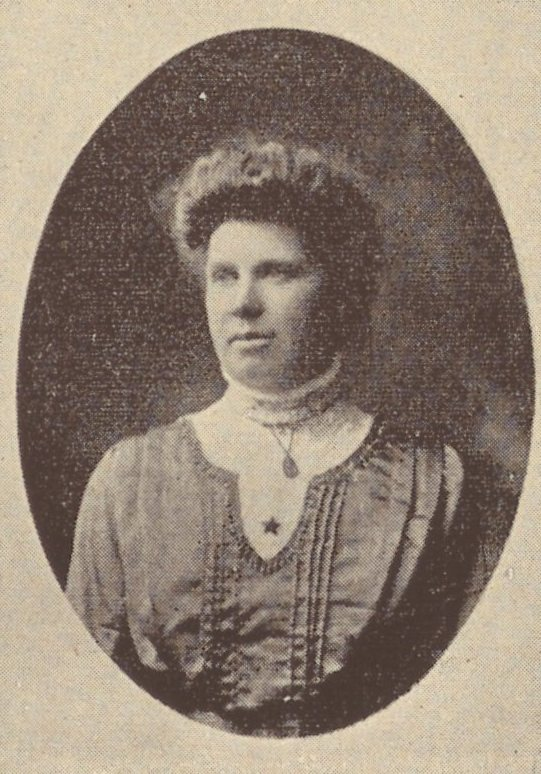
- Baird at the 1912 World Esperanto Congress in Kraków, Poland
- Born: 6 May 1875; Edinburgh, Scotland, U.K.
- Died: 25 March 1960 (aged 84); Edinburgh, Scotland, U.K.
- Occupations: Educator, Esperantist
- Employer: North Fort Street School

Jane Baird (6 May 1875 – 25 March 1960) was a Scottish educator and Esperantist. She was one of the three compilers of the Edinburgh Esperanto Pocket Dictionary (1915).

== Biography ==
Baird was born in Edinburgh, the daughter of William Baird and Jane King Mitchell Baird. She was an educator who taught at North Fort Street School in Edinburgh. Later, she taught Esperanto at Leith's Technical College.

Baird learned the International auxiliary language Esperanto. She joined the Edinburgh Esperanto Society in 1909, and later served as vice-president. She attended the 1912 World Esperanto Congress in Kraków, Poland, with fellow society members. She organised a monthly contest that ran for six years until the end 1922, inviting children to send her postcards with their answers to Esperanto questions. She was on the organising committee of the 1926 World Esperanto Congress in Edinburgh.

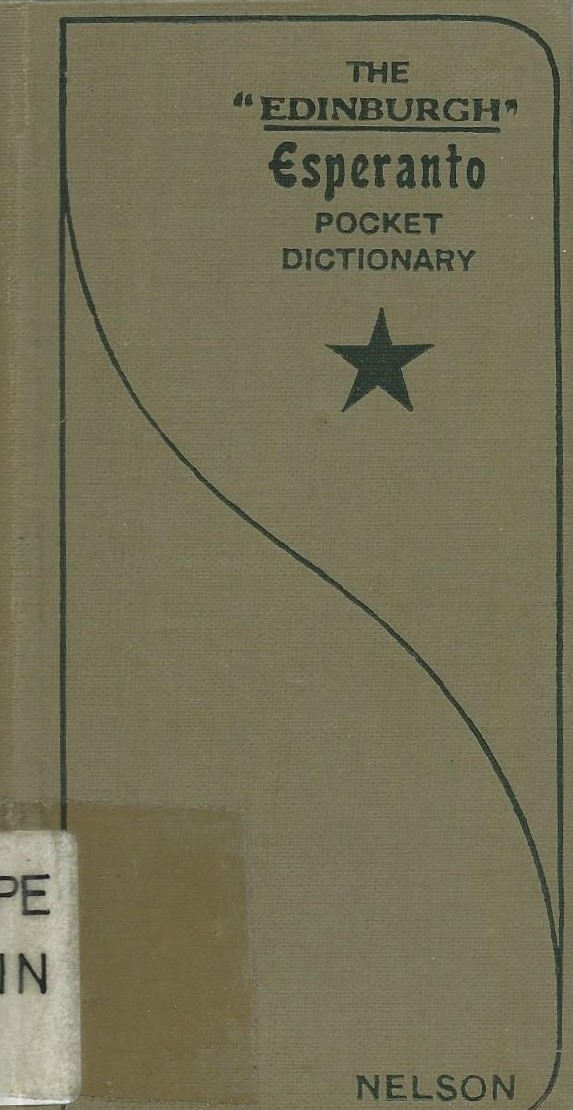
1928 copy of the Edinburgh Esperanto Pocket Dictionary

Baird was one of the three compilers of the Edinburgh Esperanto Pocket Dictionary, working along with John Mabon Warden [pl] and William Harvey. It was first published in 1915. By the time of her death over a hundred thousand copies of the Dictionary had been sold in English-speaking countries.

Baird died in 1960, aged 84, at a nursing home in Edinburgh.

== Publications ==
- "Notes for an Object Lesson" (1915, The Esperanto Monthly)
