= Zamanov =

Zamanov is a surname.

Those bearing it include:

- Nuru Zamanov (fl. 2000s), Azerbaijan footballer on Spartak Baku
- Nadir Zamanov (fl. 2000s), Azerbaijan footballer on Kavkaz Belokan
- Elnur Zamanov (fl. 2000s), Azerbaijan footballer on Araz Naxçivan
- Andreas Zamanov (fl. 2000s), Former estonian footballer on Jk Tarvas II

== See also ==
- Zamenhof
