= Adolf Holzhaus =

German Esperantist and historian

Adolf Holzhaus (1892 – 6 June 1982) was an Esperantist and historian of the Esperanto movement. Between 1959 and 1985, he compiled biographies of the lives of Esperanto creator L. L. Zamenhof and his family, Esperanto pioneer Wilhelm Heinrich Trompeter, and others. He edited and published documents on the history of Esperanto, including Zamenhof's Hillelism and "Provo de gramatiko de novjuda lingvo kaj alvoko al la juda intelektularo".

Holzhaus authored "Vivokuroj de esperantistoj" (Life-Courses of Esperantists) as an intended replacement for the Encyclopedia of Esperanto. His book, which remained unpublished, now sits in the Esperanto Museum.

== Works ==
- 1969:Doktoro kaj lingvo Esperanto (1969) eldonis Fondumo Esperanto
- 1971/1973: Wilhelm Heinrich Trompeter. Biografio de la unua mecenato de Esperanto eldonis Esperanto-Ligo en Israelo 1971, 2-a eld 1973
- 1973:Granda Galerio Zamenhofa 1. Helsinki: Fondumo Esperanto 1973 (kolekto de 952 fotoj pri L.L. Zamenhof kaj ties familio kun klarigoj). Boris Kolker jugxis je 2004-04-16: "Valorega kolekto, kiun eldonigis la kompilinto per sia modesta pensio. Alte rekomendinda."
- 1975: Zamenhof; Leteroj. Helsinki:Fondumo Esperanto 1975.
- 1978: Granda Galerio Zamenhofa 2. Helsinki: Fondumo Esperanto 1978
