= Louis-Christophe Zaleski-Zamenhof =

Polish-born French engineer (1925–2019)

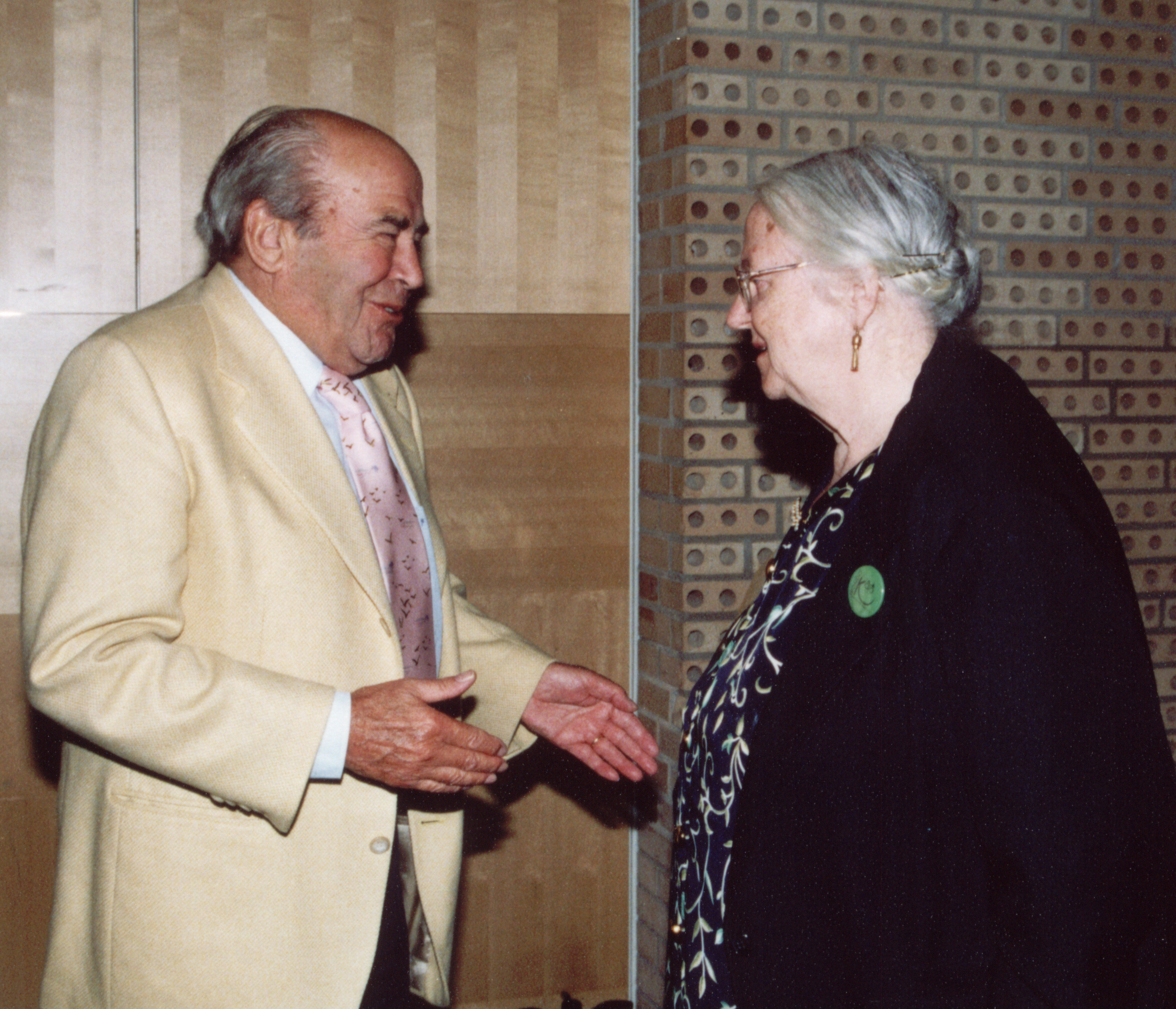
- Louis-Christophe Zaleski-Zamenhof and Marjorie Boulton, another prominent Esperantist (2003).
- Born: Ludwik Zamenhof; 23 January 1925; Warsaw, Poland
- Died: 9 October 2019 (aged 94); Paris, France
- Parents: Adam Zamenhof (father); Wanda Zamenhof (mother)
- Relatives: Zofia Zamenhof (aunt); Lidia Zamenhof; L. L. Zamenhof (grandfather)

Louis-Christophe Zaleski-Zamenhof (born Ludwik Zamenhof; 23 January 1925 – 9 October 2019) was a Polish-born French civil and marine engineer, specializing in the design of structural steel and concrete construction. He was a grandson of the Polish Jewish L. L. Zamenhof, the inventor of the international auxiliary language Esperanto. From the 1960s until his death, Zaleski-Zamenhof lived in France.

== Early years ==
Zamenhof was born in Warsaw, to a Jewish family. After his father Adam Zamenhof was arrested and shot to death by the Nazis occupying Poland, he and his mother, Wanda (Frenkiel), barely escaped deportation to the Nazi death camp at Treblinka where his aunts, pediatrician Zofia Zamenhof and writer Lidia Zamenhof, were murdered. Together with some members of his family he survived in the Warsaw Ghetto, where he was one of the individuals aided by the parish priest Marceli Godlewski. The teenager remained in hiding within Poland under the false name of 'Krzysztof Zaleski', a name he maintained afterwards in remembrance of the ordeal.

During that time, he worked in a tomato field together with a Pole who happened to speak Esperanto; this person once tried to recruit him to the cause, asking him: Ĉu vi konas Esperanton? ("Do you know about Esperanto?"). 'Christoph' blurted out: Ho jes, mi konas; ĝin inventis mia avo! ("Oh yes, I know it; my grandfather invented it!") He immediately feared that he had been indiscreet and would be denounced and arrested, but nothing untoward occurred.

== Career ==
After earning a doctorate in civil and marine engineering, he began work as a professional engineer. Beginning in Poland after World War II and since the 1960s in France, he designed precast concrete structures and projects ranging from deep-sea oil rigs, sports complexes, and the Charles de Gaulle Memorial, which dominates the village of Colombey-les-Deux-Églises. He also taught the theory and techniques of land and sea construction at various academic institutions.

On 14 April 1999 Hanna Konopka, president of the Zamenhof Foundation of Białystok, announced that Pope John Paul II would be the first recipient of the Foundation's Tolerance Medal (Medalo de Toleremo). As well as the Esperantist trustees of the Foundation, the award committee included eminent persons such as Archbishop Stanisław Szymecki; the award met with general approval among the people of Białystok. Zaleski-Zamenhof presented the Tolerance Medal on 10 June 1999, during the Pope's historic visit to Poland.

Dr. Zaleski-Zamenhof wrote a foreword to L'homme qui a défié Babel ("The man who defied Babel", 2003), a French-language biography, by René Centassi and Henri Masson, of the originator of Esperanto.

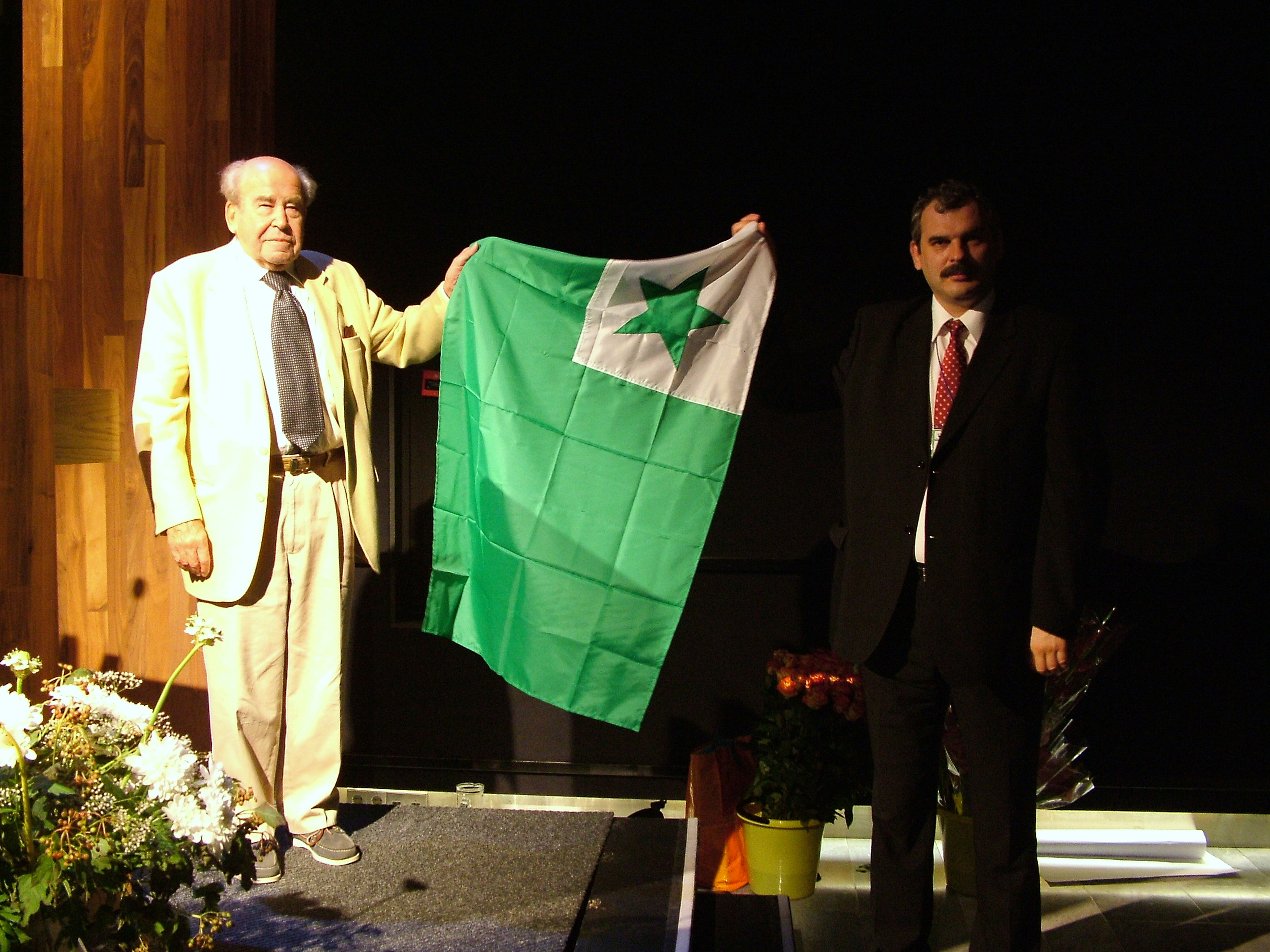
Louis-Christophe Zaleski-Zamenhof with the deputy mayor of Białystok during the 2008 World Congress of Esperanto.

== World Congress addresses ==
In a 2001 speech, Dr. Zaleski-Zamenhof characterized the 86th World Congress of Esperanto in Zagreb, Croatia as not only the first such World Congress in the third millennium of the civil calendar but also the third century of Esperanto, reminding the delegates: "You came to discuss intercultural dialogue, the pressing need for which inspired the initiation of the international language. In fact, almost all his biographies relate the story of the young Ludwik Łazarz Zamenhof living in the multicultural city of Białystok, observing the animosity that then governed relations among the varied nationalities, not finding a commonly understandable language, a tool that was, as he said, necessary for dialogue among the respective cultures. Mutual dialogue enables people to understand and respect different cultures; without such an understanding, a foreign culture may appear strange or inimical and inspire disdain, contempt or hatred."

Indeed, he pointed out, the English word strange and the French word étrange both mean 'odd' or 'peculiar', while the related words stranger and étranger mean 'foreigner', and the neutral language used at World Congresses of Esperanto, which implies equality among linguistic communities, can respect other cultures yet strictly avoid imposing any particular mode of thought on them, even if they happen to be non-influential minorities.

The following year, Zaleski-Zamenhof sent a written greeting to the 87th World Congress meeting in Fortaleza, Brazil. Declaring that mankind is a species created for diversity, he congratulated the Brazilian hosts for the variegatedness of the nation's natural setting and the diversity of its peoples, customs and cultures and favourably compared Brazilians to the "great family circle" of worldwide Esperantism, urging people not to see cultural differences as a threat but as their good fortune.

In 2003 Dr. Zaleski-Zamenhof again addressed a World Congress, this time in Gothenburg, Sweden, recalling how, 60 years previous during World War II, the very name of Gothenburg had for him and his family been emblematic of human rights and freedom: "To us, then in occupied Warsaw, incarcerated within its infamous walls, Gothenburg was a fabled world from which, like the manna from the skies in Biblical times, a panoply of delicious foods used to come whose very existence we had by then long since forgotten. I will always remember the sender's name written on the packages: Einar Adamson, an Esperanto speaker from Gothenburg. I fondly remember having the chance in 1948 to meet him in person on the occasion of the Malmö World Congress of Esperanto, the only Congress I was able to attend during the decade after the war. At that time I also became acquainted with the city of Gothenburg, and became a friend with Adamson's entire family; moreover, Einar's daughter remains my very dear friend."

Further, he called for harmony among peoples, for recognition of all people's right to speak their chosen language, including the neutral language of Esperanto, and for the ending of world hunger through support for an effective and measured campaign of action at UNESCO and the United Nations.

== Zamenhof Street biography ==
Thoroughly committed to the Esperanto cause, as attested by his customary public greetings to World Congresses of Esperanto on behalf of the Zamenhof family, Louis-Christophe Zaleski-Zamenhof was nevertheless disinclined to assume a leading role in the Esperanto movement. Though he had no plans to write an autobiography, Polish journalist Roman Dobrzyński persuaded him to participate in a series of conversations over a ten-year period, which resulted in La Zamenhof-strato ("Zamenhof Street", 2003), a book detailing his life during the Nazi occupation of Poland, including his experiences in the Warsaw Ghetto and the Polish Resistance. Beyond an account of his own life, the book also relates the philosophy, history and tribulations of the Esperanto movement pioneered by his grandfather, and speculates as to the planned language's future prospects. The book has now been published in Polish, Esperanto, Lithuanian, Czech, Italian, Japanese, Portuguese, Slovak, French, English and Korean.

== Death ==
Zaleski-Zamenhof died in 2019. He is survived by his daughters Hanna Zaruski-Zamenhof and Margaret Zaleski-Zamenhof, the latter active in Esperanto circles as of 2020.

== Writings ==
J. P. Bonin, G. Deleuil and L. C. Zaleski-Zamenhof. "Foundation analysis of marine gravity structures submitted to cyclic loading." Offshore Technology Conference, Houston, Texas (1976). pp. 571–579
