= Homaranismo =

Proposed world religion

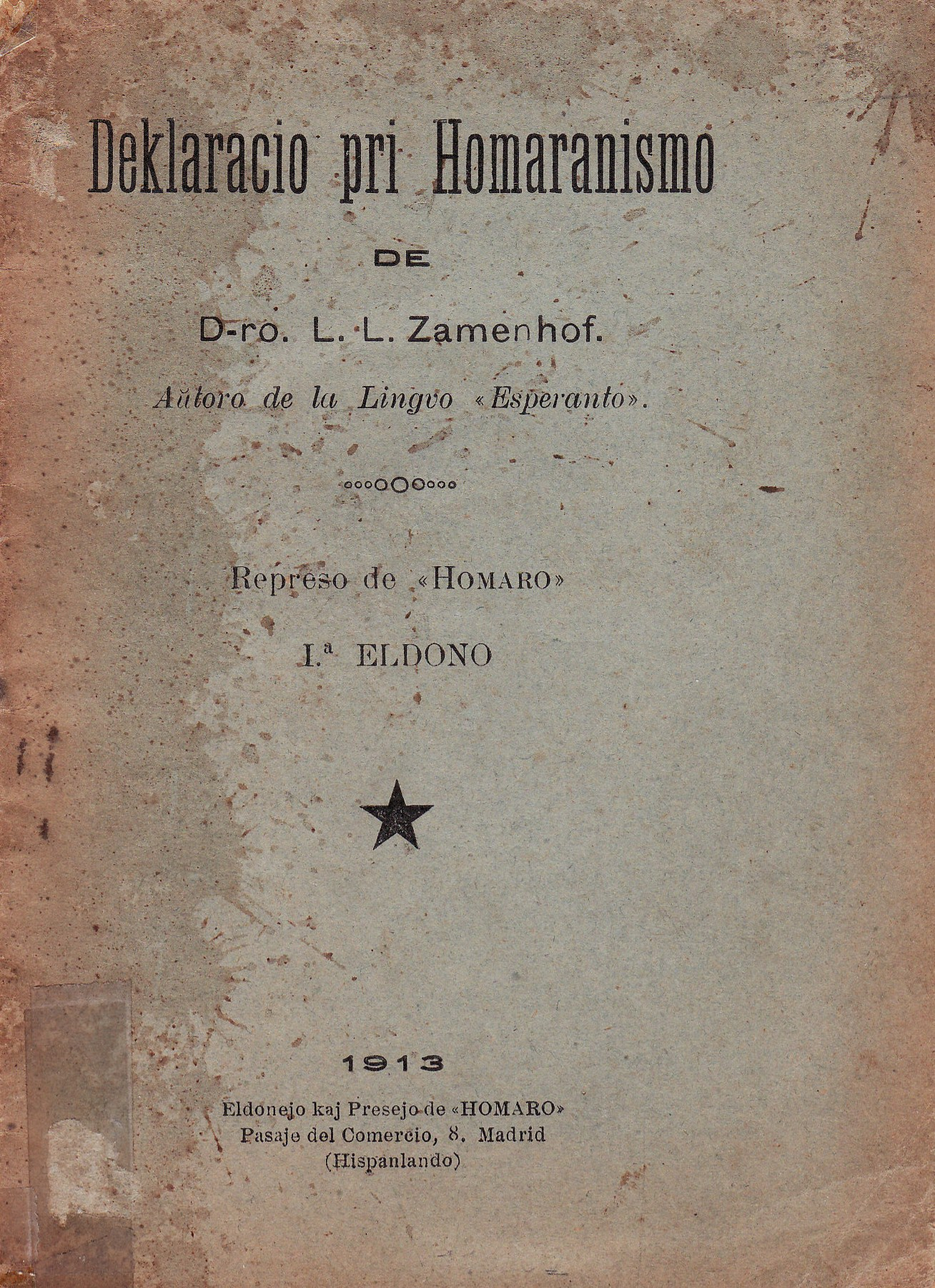
Declaration on Humanism

Homaranismo (English: Humanitism) is a philosophy based on a set of principles for a moral common ground across religious divisions, developed by L. L. Zamenhof, who laid the foundations of the Esperanto language. Based largely on the teachings of Hillel the Elder, Zamenhof originally called it Hillelism. He sought to reform Judaism because he hoped that without the strict dress code and purity requirements, it would no longer be the victim of antisemitic propaganda. The basis of Homaranismo is the sentence known as the Golden Rule: One should treat others as one would like others to treat oneself.

Zamenhof wrote in the preface to his book Homaranismo:

Under the name "Homaranismo" [...] I mean "striving for humanity", for the elimination of interethnic hatred and injustice, and for such a way of life that could gradually lead not theoretically but practically to the spiritual unification of humanity.

Based on this idea, he came to the conclusion that this philosophy could be a bridge between religions, not just a subset of Judaism. Zamenhof subsequently renamed his philosophy Homaranismo.

While many different motivations drew early Esperantists to that movement, for Zamenhof, Esperanto was always a means by which to facilitate improved human relations, especially beyond boundaries of race, language and culture. Zamenhof's daughter Lidia embraced this philosophy and taught it alongside Esperanto and her adopted religion, the Baháʼí Faith.

Despite his Esperanto language project, Zamenhof said of Homaranismo, "It is indeed the object of my whole life. I would give up everything for it."

Zamenhof developed his ideas on Homaranismo in two works: Hilelismo (1901) and Homaranismo (1913).

== See also ==
- Humanism
