= Zamenhof-Esperanto object =

Object or place linked to Esperanto or its creator, Ludwik Zamenhof

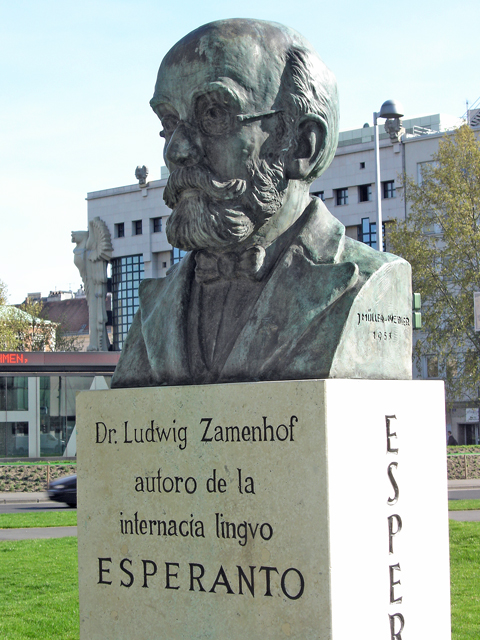
L. L. Zamenhof bust in the Esperantopark in Vienna

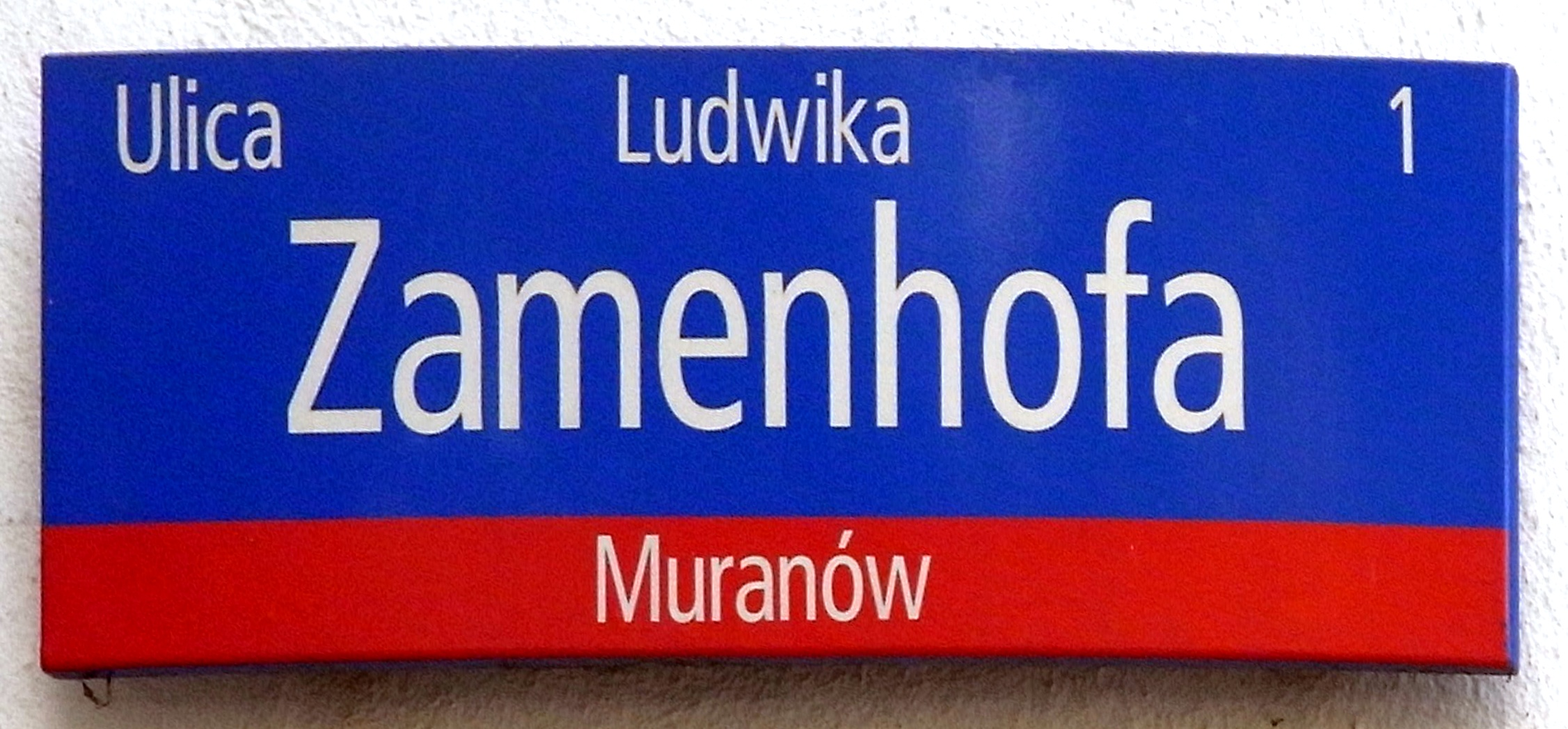
Zamenhof street in Warsaw

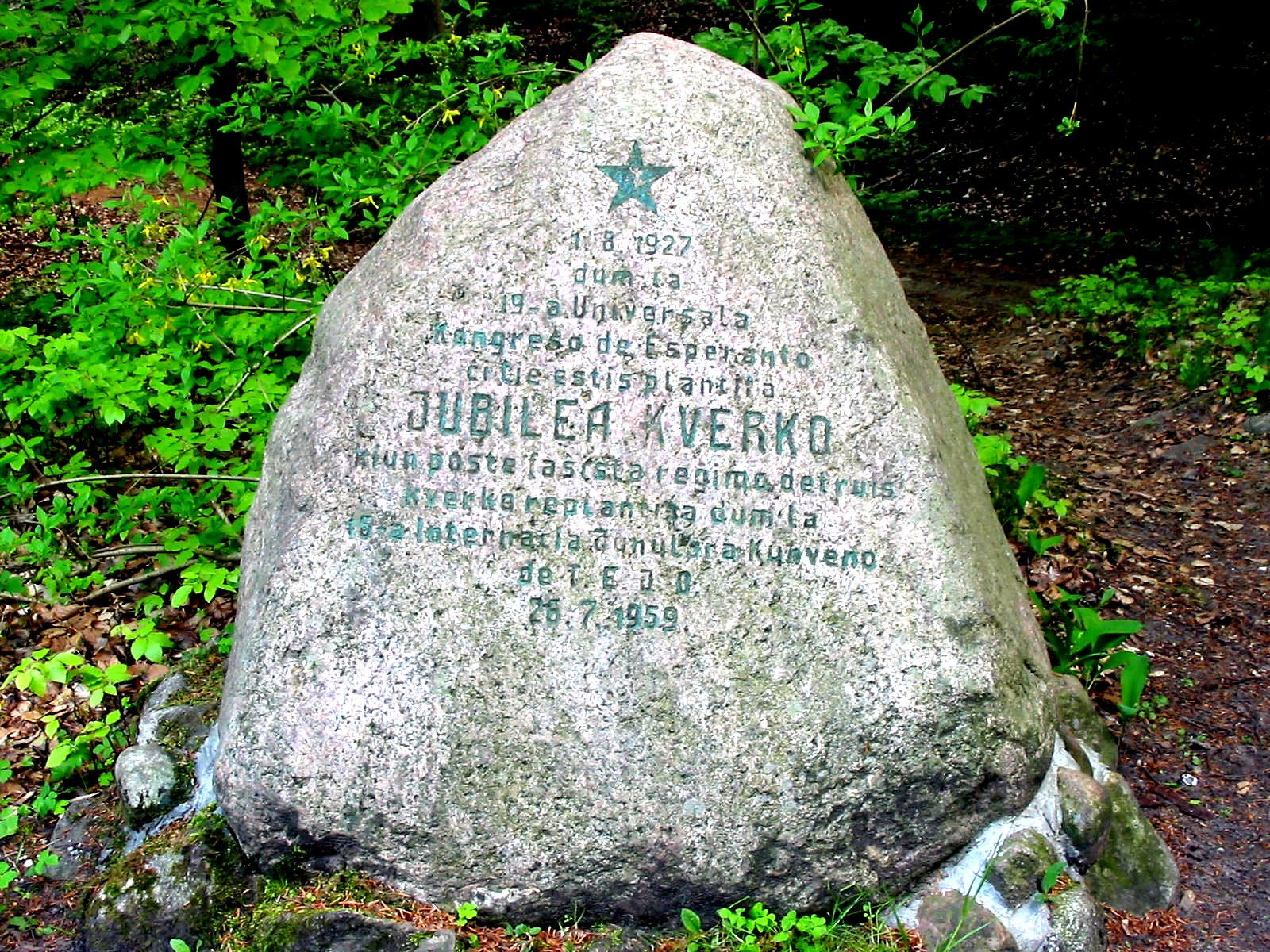
A stone in Sopot, Poland, commemorating Esperanto congresses of 1927 and 1959

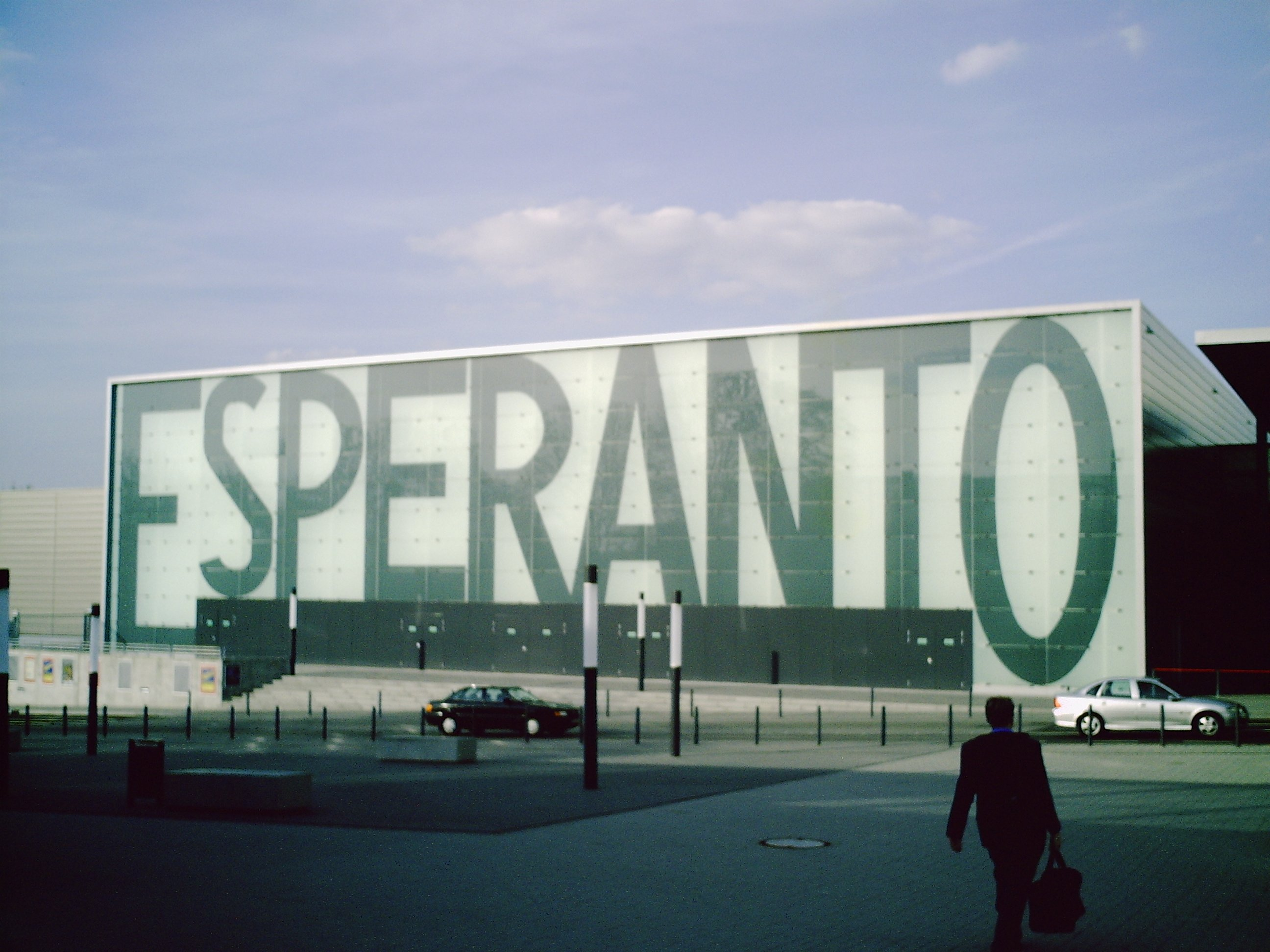
Hotel Esperanto Kongress- / Kulturzentrum in Fulda, Germany, (built in 2005)

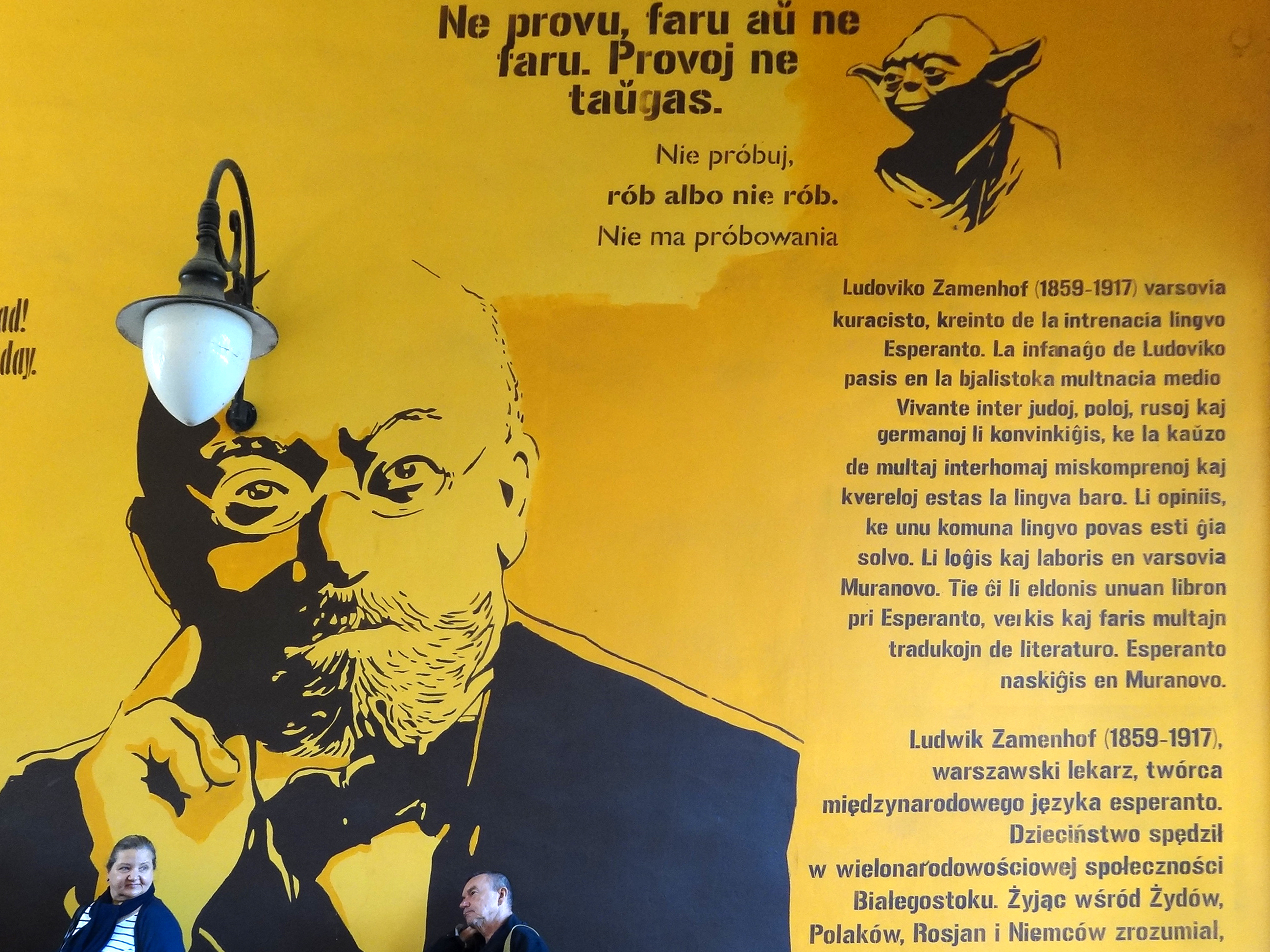
A mural of Zamenhof with a note on him in Esperanto, Warsaw, Poland (painted in 2011)

A Zamenhof-Esperanto object (Esperanto: Zamenhof/Esperanto-Objekto, ZEO) is a monument or place linked to L. L. Zamenhof, to the constructed language Esperanto that he created and first published in 1887, or to the community of Esperanto speakers which has been using the language since.

== History of Zamenhof-Esperanto objects and their registration ==
The first Zamenhof-Esperanto object was the ship Esperanto, constructed and launched in Spain in 1896, nine years after the language's birth. The 1934 Encyclopedia of Esperanto listed approximately 50 towns and cities in which Esperanto or Zamenhof have been honored. In 1997, a German Esperantist, Hugo Röllinger, published a book titled Monumente pri Esperanto – ilustrita dokumentaro pri 1044 Zamenhof/Esperanto-objektoj en 54 landoj ("Monumentally about Esperanto – an illustrated documentary of 1,044 Zamenhof-Esperanto objects in 54 countries") and until his death in 2001 he listed a total of 1,260 such objects. It is he who coined the acronym ZEO. Currently, Robert Kamiński of Poland is the person charged with the registration of ZEOs by the Universal Esperanto Association.

== Notable Zamenhof-Esperanto objects ==
- Tallest
  - At 12 meters, the Zamenhof monument in Sabadell, Spain, dating from 1989
- Longest
  - At 4 kilometers, Esperanto Street in São Sebastião do Caí, Brazil
- Northernmost
  - A monument to Esperanto in Narvik, Norway, at 68°25' N
  - Esperanto Creek in Alaska, United States, at 63°27' N
  - Cape Esperanto, Svalbard, Norway, at 78°37' N
- Southernmost
  - Esperanto tree in Tasmania, Australia, at 42° S
  - Zamenhof monument and Esperanto Street in Mar del Plata, Argentina
  - Zamenhof street in Gqeberha (formerly Port Elizabeth), South Africa
  - Esperanto Island, Antarctica, at 62°25'43" S
- Most remote
  - The asteroids 1462 Zamenhof and 1421 Esperanto
  - An inscription in Esperanto carried by the Voyager 1 and Voyager 2 spacecraft on their journey out of the Solar System

== See also ==
- Esperanto culture
