= 1462 Zamenhof =

Carbonaceous Themistian asteroid

Discovery
- Discovered by: Y. Väisälä
- Discovery site: Turku Obs.
- Discovery date: 6 February 1938

Designations
- Named after: L. L. Zamenhof (creator of Esperanto)
- Alternative designations: 1938 CA · 1963 TS; 1964 VF_{2} · 1969 TU_{5}
- Minor planet category: main-belt · (outer); Themis

Orbital characteristics
- Epoch 4 September 2017 (JD 2458000.5)
- Uncertainty parameter 0
- Observation arc: 53.72 yr (19,623 days)
- Aphelion: 3.4958 AU
- Perihelion: 2.8032 AU
- Semi-major axis: 3.1495 AU
- Eccentricity: 0.1100
- Orbital period (sidereal): 5.59 yr (2,042 days)
- Mean anomaly: 7.0433°
- Mean motion: 0° 10^{m} 34.68^{s} / day
- Inclination: 0.9657°
- Longitude of ascending node: 24.810°
- Argument of perihelion: 187.54°

Physical characteristics
- Dimensions: 25.62 km (derived); 25.91±0.55 km 26.57±0.52 km 27.366±0.166 km 27.645±0.395 km
- Synodic rotation period: 10.2±0.6 h 10.4±0.1 h
- Geometric albedo: 0.087±0.015; 0.0891 (derived); 0.1108±0.0319; 0.121±0.005
- Spectral type: C (assumed)
- Absolute magnitude (H): 10.80 · 11.20 · 11.31±0.32

1462 Zamenhof, provisional designation 1938 CA, is a carbonaceous Themistian asteroid from the outer regions of the asteroid belt, approximately 27 kilometers in diameter. It was discovered on 6 February 1938, by Finnish astronomer Yrjö Väisälä at the Iso-Heikkilä Observatory in Finland. The asteroid was named after L. L. Zamenhof, the creator of Esperanto. It is a recognized Zamenhof-Esperanto object.

== Orbit and classification ==
Zamenhof is a Themistian asteroid that belongs to the Themis family (602), a very large family of carbonaceous asteroids, named after 24 Themis. It orbits the Sun in the outer main-belt at a distance of 2.8–3.5 AU once every 5 years and 7 months (2,042 days). Its orbit has an eccentricity of 0.11 and an inclination of 1° with respect to the ecliptic. The body's observation arc begins at the discovering observatory, one month prior to its official discovery observation.

== Physical characteristics ==
The Lightcurve Data Base assumes Zamenhof to be a common, carbonaceous C-type asteroid, in agreement with the overall spectral type of the Themis family.

=== Rotation period ===
Two rotational lightcurves of Zamenhof were obtained from photometric observations in 2006 and 2011. Lightcurve analysis gave a rotation period of 10.2 and 10.4 hours with a brightness amplitude of 0.15 and 0.30 magnitude, respectively (U=2/2).

=== Diameter and albedo ===
According to the surveys carried out by the Japanese Akari satellite and the NEOWISE mission of NASA's Wide-field Infrared Survey Explorer, Zamenhof measures between 25.91 and 27.645 kilometers in diameter and its surface has an albedo between 0.087 and 0.121.

The Collaborative Asteroid Lightcurve Link derives an albedo of 0.0891 and a diameter of 25.62 kilometers based on an absolute magnitude of 11.2.

== Naming ==
This minor planet was named after L. L. Zamenhof (1859–1917), a Polish-Jewish ophthalmologist and creator of Esperanto, a constructed international language. This asteroid and 1421 Esperanto are considered to be the most remote Zamenhof-Esperanto objects (a monument or a place celebrating Zamenhof). The official naming citation was published by the Minor Planet Center in January 1956 (M.P.C. 1350).
