= Ludwik Zamenhof Centre =

The Ludwik Zamenhof Centre
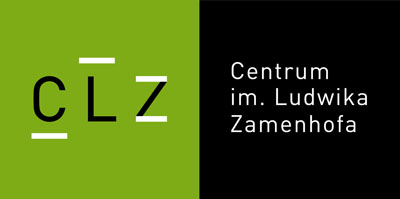

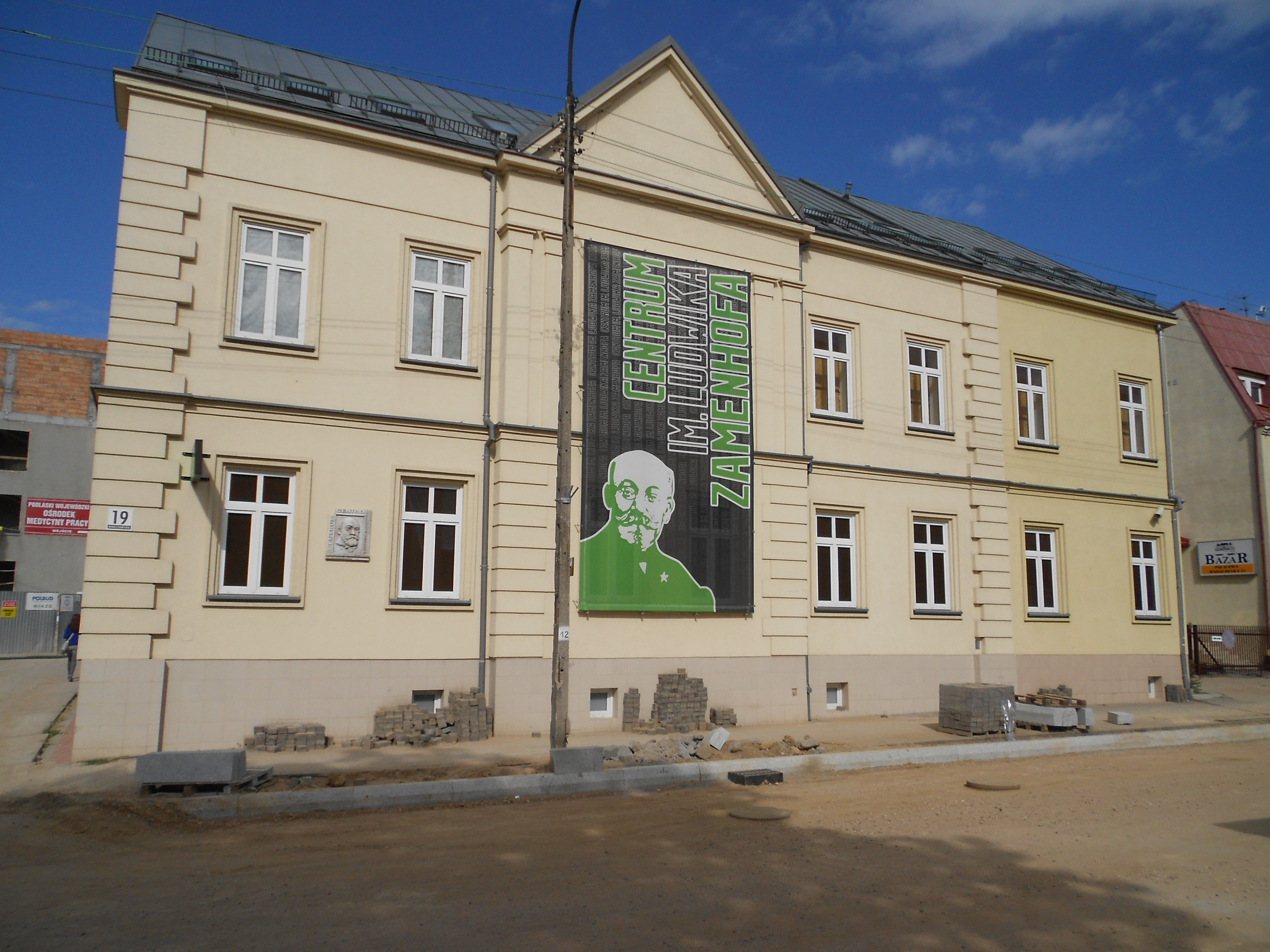
- Location: ul. Warszawska 19; 15-062 Białystok
- Coordinates: 53°08′01″N 23°10′11″E
- Director: Jerzy Szerszunowicz

The Ludwik Zamenhof Centre is a cultural institution located in Białystok, Poland, at ulica Warszawska 19 (19 Warsaw Street). It was founded at the initiative of the city's president (mayor) in celebration of the 94th World Congress of Esperanto that was held in Białystok from 25 July to 1 August 2009.

== History ==
The Centre was opened to visitors on 21 July 2009. Initially it was a branch of the Białystok Cultural Centre but since January 2011 has been an autonomous cultural institution.

The Zamenhof Centre hosts a permanent exhibition – "The Bialystok of Young Zamenhof" – and temporary exhibits, concerts, film showings, and theatre performances. The Centre also regularly holds panel discussions, lectures, and literary events.

Additionally the Zamenhof Centre organizes educational workshops for children and teenagers as well as social and educational programs such as the Living Library and "Discover Bialystok", an outdoor activity conducted in the city.

== Description ==
The building where the Ludwik Zamenhof Centre is situated was included in the Jewish Heritage Trail, which was opened in June 2008 in Bialystok. The Trail was created by a group of University of Białystok students and doctoral candidates – volunteers for the University of Bialystok Foundation. The building is also a part of the Trail of Esperanto and Many Cultures, which was opened in June 2009.

== Activity ==
As education is a significant part of the centre's objectives, the scope of the centre's activity encompasses some classes for children devoted to the person of Ludwik Zamenhof, the Esperanto language, and also to the multiculturalism, history and tradition of Bialystok in a broad sense. Modern methods and teaching aids are applied in order to educate according to the idea of teaching by entertaining.

== Permanent exhibition ==
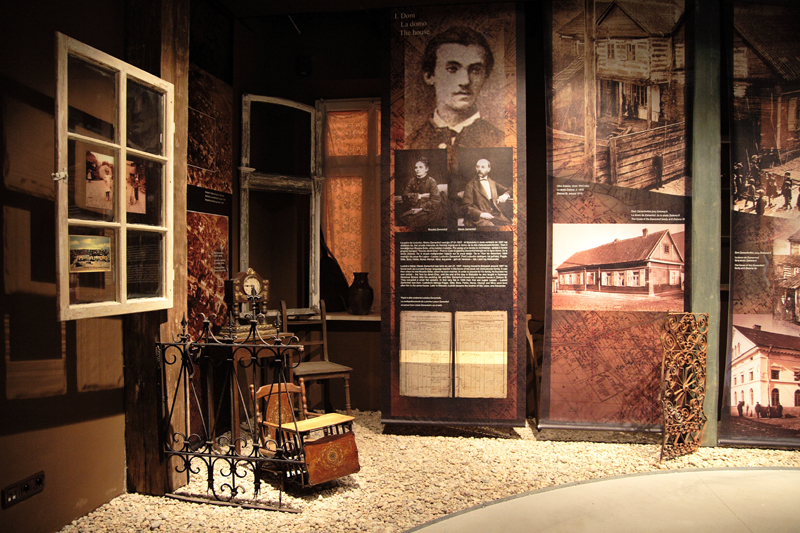

The permanent exhibition titled "Białystok of Young Zamenhof" deals with the life and work of Ludwik Zamenhof. Using sound, video, and photographic materials, the exhibition illustrates the city of Białystok in the 19th century when Ludwik was growing up.

The permanent exhibition is used as a substantial basis for numerous scripts of educational classes for children and teenagers.

== Esperanto Library ==
Esperanto – Libraro was opened on May 12, 2010, in the building of the Ludwik Zamenhof Centre as a branch of Lukasz Gornicki's Podlaska Library in Bialystok. It is the first public library in Poland that has a collection in Esperanto and publications devoted to this language. The library's opening hours: Tuesday, Wednesday, Thursday: 1 p.m. – 5.30 p.m., Friday: 1 p.m. – 5 p.m.
