= 1421 Esperanto =

Dark background asteroid

Discovery
- Discovered by: Y. Väisälä
- Discovery site: Turku Obs.
- Discovery date: 18 March 1936

Designations
- Named after: Esperanto (artificial language)
- Alternative designations: 1936 FQ · 1931 HC; 1958 GD · A906 UD; A917 XD · A920 GD
- Minor planet category: main-belt · (outer) background

Orbital characteristics
- Epoch 27 April 2019 (JD 2458600.5)
- Uncertainty parameter 0
- Observation arc: 111.92 yr (40,879 d)
- Aphelion: 3.3505 AU
- Perihelion: 2.8280 AU
- Semi-major axis: 3.0893 AU
- Eccentricity: 0.0846
- Orbital period (sidereal): 5.43 yr (1,983 d)
- Mean anomaly: 77.705°
- Mean motion: 0° 10^{m} 53.4^{s} / day
- Inclination: 9.8030°
- Longitude of ascending node: 42.595°
- Argument of perihelion: 163.18°

Physical characteristics
- Mean diameter: 43.31±3.1 km 51.95±10.21 km 56.68±0.96 km 62.06±17.35 km 64.37±25.60 km
- Synodic rotation period: 21.982±0.005 h
- Geometric albedo: 0.03; 0.042; 0.0714±0.011; 0.098
- Spectral type: C (assumed)
- Absolute magnitude (H): 9.56; 10.30; 10.4; 10.42

1421 Esperanto, provisional designation 1936 FQ, is a dark background asteroid from the outer regions of the asteroid belt, approximately 55 kilometers (34 miles) in diameter. It was discovered on 18 March 1936, by Finnish astronomer Yrjö Väisälä at the Iso-Heikkilä Observatory in Turku, southwest Finland. The presumed C-type asteroid has a rotation period of nearly 22 hours. It was named for the artificial language Esperanto.

== Orbit and classification ==
Esperanto has been determined a non-family asteroid from the main belt's background population by means of modern HCM-analysis, after it had previously been grouped to the Eos family by Zappalà in the 1990s.

It orbits the Sun in the outer asteroid belt at a distance of 2.8–3.4 AU once every 5 years and 5 months (1,983 days; semi-major axis of 3.09 AU). Its orbit has an eccentricity of 0.08 and an inclination of 10° with respect to the ecliptic. The body's observation arc begins with its first observation as 1906 UD at Heidelberg Observatory in October 1906, almost 30 years prior to its official discovery observation at Turku.

== Naming ==
This minor planet was named by the discoverer after the constructed language, Esperanto, which was created by inventor and writer, Ludwik Lejzer Zamenhof (1859–1917), who used the pseudonym "Doktoro Esperanto". The discoverer also named another asteroid, 1462 Zamenhof, directly after the inventor. Both asteroids are considered to be the most remote Zamenhof-Esperanto objects. The official naming citation was published by the Minor Planet Center in January 1956 (M.P.C. 1350).

== Physical characteristics ==
Esperanto is an assumed, carbonaceous C-type asteroid.

=== Rotation period ===
In March 2012, a rotational lightcurve of Esperanto was obtained from photometric observations by Andrea Ferrero at the Bigmuskie Observatory (B88) in northern Italy. Lightcurve analysis gave a rotation period of 21.982±0.005 hours with a brightness amplitude of 0.15 magnitude (U=3-).

=== Diameter and albedo ===
According to the surveys carried out by the Infrared Astronomical Satellite IRAS, the Japanese Akari satellite and the NEOWISE mission of NASA's Wide-field Infrared Survey Explorer, Esperanto measures between 43.3 and 64.3 kilometers in diameter and its surface has an albedo between 0.03 and 0.098.

The Collaborative Asteroid Lightcurve Link adopts the results obtained by IRAS, that is, an albedo of 0.0714 and a diameter of 43.31 kilometers based on an absolute magnitude of 10.3.
