= Adam Zamenhof =

Polish ophthalmologist (1888–1940)

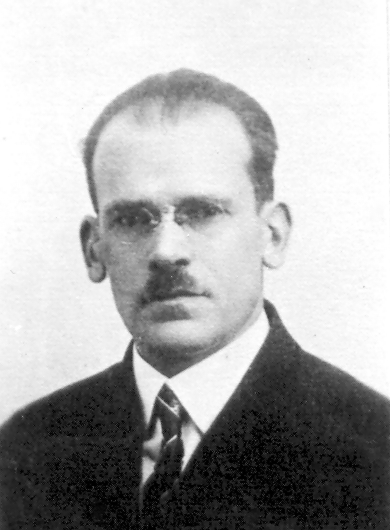
Adam Zamenhof, c. 1925

Adam Zamenhof (1888 – 29 January 1940) was a Polish physician known for his work on ophthalmology. He was the son of L. L. Zamenhof, the inventor of Esperanto, and his wife Klara. Before the Holocaust, Zamenhof had invented a device to check blind spots in the field of vision. During World War II, 6 September 1939, he was head of the Starozakonnych Hospital in Warsaw, and its director. On 1 October 1939 Zamenhof was arrested and sent to the camp in Palmiry, where he was murdered by the Germans.

Adam and his wife Wanda were the parents of Louis-Christophe Zaleski-Zamenhof.
