= Boris Kolker =

Russian-American language teacher and translator

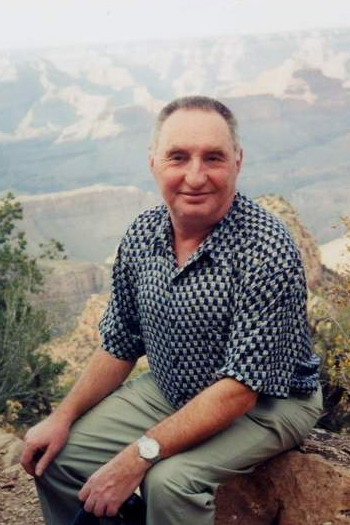
- Born: July 15, 1939 (age 85); Tiraspol, Moldavian ASSR, Soviet Union
- Occupation(s): Language teacher, translator

Boris Grigorevich Kolker (Russian: Борис Григорьевич Колкер; born July 15, 1939, in Tiraspol, Moldavian ASSR, Soviet Union) is a language teacher, translator and advocate of the international language Esperanto. He was until 1993 a Soviet and Russian citizen and since then has been a resident and citizen of the United States residing in Cleveland, Ohio. In 1985 he was awarded a Ph.D. in linguistics from the Institute of Linguistics of the Academy of Sciences of the USSR in Moscow.

== Biography ==
Dr. Kolker learned Esperanto in 1957 and is the author of articles on interlinguistics, book reviews and three famous Esperanto textbooks for students of different levels. Due to the great popularity of his book eo:Vojaĝo en Esperanto-lando (Travels in Esperanto-Land), which is both a proficiency course in Esperanto and a guidebook to Esperanto culture, he is known to many as a guide to Esperanto-Land.

Kolker is a member of the Academy of Esperanto, an honorary member of the World Esperanto Association (Universala Esperanto Asocio), and an associate editor of the monthly magazine Monato. For two decades he headed a large-scale Esperanto correspondence course in Russia that graduated around 900 students. He also taught Esperanto at American universities in San Francisco and Hartford.

Currently he runs the International Proficiency Correspondence Esperanto Course and is also Vice President of the International Examination Board for the International League of Esperanto Instructors (ILEI). At various times he was steering committee member of the World Esperanto Association (Universala Esperanto Asocio), co-founder and co-leader of nationwide Esperanto organizations in the Soviet Union and Russia. He has lectured and spoken publicly at several World Congresses of Esperanto and in 2000 he directed the theme of the 85th World Congress of Esperanto in Tel-Aviv.
