= Klara Zamenhof =

Polish Esperantist

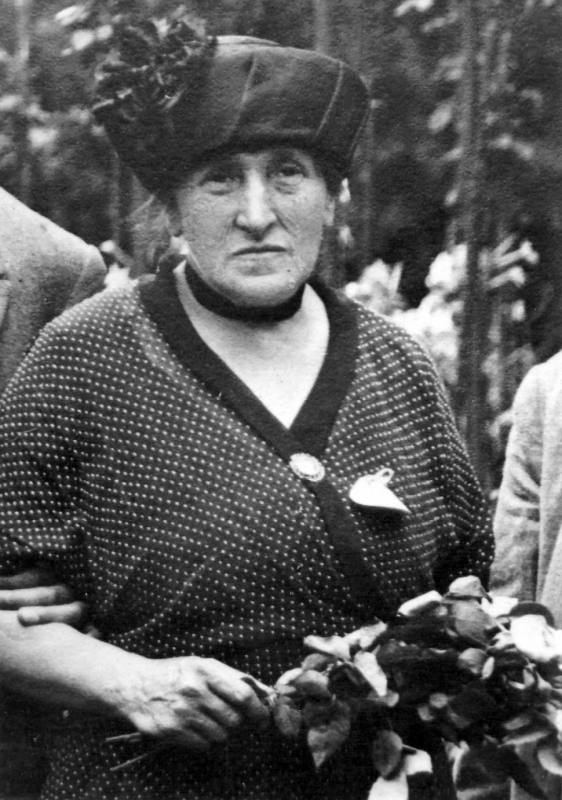
- Zamenhof in Vienna in 1924 for the 16th World Esperanto Congress
- Born: Klara Silbernik; 6 October 1863; Kovno, Kovno Governorate, Russian Empire (now Kaunas, Lithuania)
- Died: 6 December 1924 (aged 61); Warsaw, Second Polish Republic
- Burial place: Jewish Cemetery, Warsaw
- Spouse: L. L. Zamenhof (m. 1887)
- Children: Adam, Zofia and Lidia

Klara Zamenhof (née Silbernik; 6 October 1863 – 6 December 1924) was a Polish Esperantist. She was married to L. L. Zamenhof, the inventor of the Esperanto language.

== Biography ==
Klara Silbernik was born on 6 October 1863 in Kovno, Lithuania, then part of the Russian Empire. She was the oldest daughter of Alexander Sender Silbernik and Golda Silbernik, wealthy Jewish merchants from Kovno.

== Contributions to Esperanto ==
After her husband's premature death on 14 April 1917, she took over the promotion of Esperanto. She continued the development of the community centred around the language and supported her daughter Lidia, who trained as an Esperanto teacher in Europe and the United States.

== Personal life ==
She married Ludwik Lejzer Zamenhof in 1887, and raised three children: Adam, Lidia, and Zofia. All three were murdered by the Nazis.

She died in Warsaw on 6 December 1924, and is buried in the Jewish Cemetery there.
