= Zofia Zamenhof =

Polish pediatrician

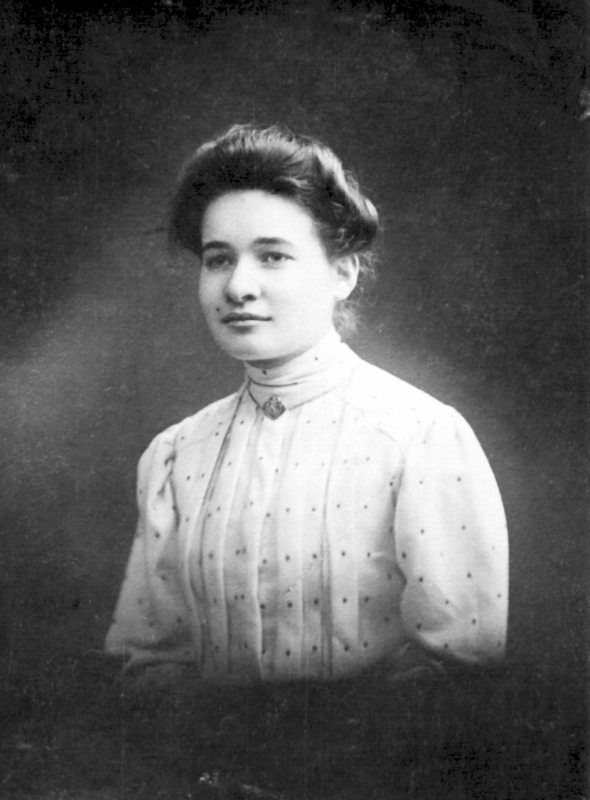
- Zamenhof circa 1906
- Born: 13 December 1889; Kaunas, Russian Empire
- Died: 13 September 1942 (aged 52); Treblinka extermination camp
- Known for: Activity in Esperanto movement
- Parent(s): L. L. Zamenhof (1859–1917); Klara Zamenhof (1863–1924)

Zofia Zamenhof (13 December 1889 – 12 September 1942) was a Polish pediatrician and a daughter of Klara Silbernik and L. L. Zamenhof, the inventor of Esperanto.

From 1906 to 1913 she completed her medical studies at the University of Lausanne and she passed a state examination in Saint Petersburg in 1914. She then continued to specialize in internal and pediatric diseases. She worked at a hospital in Lebedyn, and from 1922 in a hospital in Warsaw. During World War II, she moved to the Warsaw Ghetto. Despite the presence of the Nazis, she continued her medical practice until she was arrested and transported to a death camp. In 1942 she was taken from the Umschlagplatz in Warsaw's ghetto to the extermination camp in Treblinka, where she was murdered, most likely in a gas chamber.

Her symbolic tomb (commemorative plaque near the tomb of Klara Zamenhof) is located on the Jewish Cemetery, Warsaw.
