= Esperanto culture =

Culture associated with speakers of Esperanto

Esperanto culture refers to the shared cultural experience of the Esperantujo, or Esperanto-speaking community. Despite being a constructed language, Esperanto has a history dating back to the late 19th century, and shared socio-cultural mores have developed among its speakers. Some of these can be traced back to the initial ideas of the language's creator, Ludwig Zamenhof, including the theory that a global second language would foster international communication. Others have developed over time, as the language has allowed different national and linguistic cultures to blend together.

Esperanto culture also includes art, literature, and music, as well as international celebrations and cultural exchanges such as the Pasporta Servo.

== Writing ==
Esperanto was originally a language that one had to learn entirely through books, and even today most people live apart from each other and converse through the internet, so writing and reading are a big part of Esperanto culture. Many speakers have created or translated some sort of written work whether fiction or nonfiction, published or available to read online for free.

Penpals have been popular since Esperanto's earliest days, as Esperanto was originally advertised as a language where you could "send a letter with a message, short list of grammar rules and a dictionary to a complete stranger, and they'll be able to look up the words and write a coherent reply back". Many people did indeed do this in order to recruit more Esperanto speakers.

At the time, in the early 1900s, there was no major world language that could be used "anywhere" and it was difficult to get accurate information about foreign countries. On top of that, things like stamp collecting were popular hobbies for children. In the modern day, most Esperanto speakers talk to each other through the internet.

There are over a hundred regularly distributed Esperanto magazines.Monato ("month") is a general news magazine "like a genuinely international Time or Newsweek", written by local correspondents. A magazine for the blind, Aŭroro, has been published since 1920 and in general, Esperanto hosts the largest Braille publications in the world — starting in the early 1900s Esperanto was taught in schools of the blind in Europe, and that is where the trend started. Esperanto is the magazine used by the World Esperanto Association to inform its members about everything happening in the Esperanto community. There are many more magazines created by individual Esperanto clubs from towns in places such as from Japan and China.

== Literature ==
There are over 25,000 books available in Esperanto, including originals and translations. Books that are translated to Esperanto are not always internationally famous books; for example, there are Esperanto translations of several Japanese crime novels and several Icelandic novels that have never been translated to any other language. This is because of the availability of translations into other languages, the tendency of Esperanto writers to translate their personal favourite books, and the fact that it can be cheaper and easier to get the rights to translate a less popular book.

For example, an unauthorized Esperanto translation of Harry Potter and the Philosopher's Stone, one of the most widely translated books in the world, was completed in 2004. The translator inquired about how to purchase translating rights so the book could be published, but J.K. Rowling refused to allow it to be published in Esperanto.

Similarly, famous books translated into Esperanto are often books in the public domain such as the Bible, the Quran, or works by Shakespeare, Molière, and Balzac, because there are no rights on them. (Note: There is a perpetual Crown Copyright on the King James's Bible but the Esperanto Bible is translated from the Hebrew and Greek original text.)

Esperanto literature and organisations such as the Universal Esperanto Association (Sennacieca Asocio Tutmonda or SAT) often advocated against nationalism, leading to several fascist and communist governments attempting to ban and eradicate its usage: Germany, Francoist Spain, Portugal, as well as in the Soviet Union. However, the level to which this discrimination was due to association with Judaism and Jewish people cannot be fully known; Hitler wrote of it as intrinsically Jewish and called it a "Jewish weapon" in his Mein Kampf. Following this history of suppression, Esperanto literature frequently concerns themes of resistance and anti-nationalism, though not all criticism of Esperanto is grounded in politics.

== Media ==
Esperanto music is usually done in the traditional style of a person's country, but "international" music (American pop music, rap music etc.) also exists. Many famous songs are translated to Esperanto as well, for example "La vie en rose" and "En el frente de Gandesa".

There are currently radio broadcasts from China Radio International, Melbourne Ethnic Community Radio, Radio Havana Cuba, Radio Audizioni Italiane (Rai), Radio Polonia, Radio F.R.E.I. and Radio Vatican. Many more people have personal podcasts and vlogs.

In 1964, Jacques-Louis Mahé produced the first full-length feature film in Esperanto, entitled Angoroj. This was followed in 1965 by the first American Esperanto-production: Incubus, starring William Shatner. Incubus however is commonly seen as a funny way of introducing a person to Esperanto, as none of the actors even knew how to pronounce Esperanto in the first place, the dialogue being strange and bad due to the scriptwriter not getting a second opinion before the filming was done, and the plot being confusing in general.

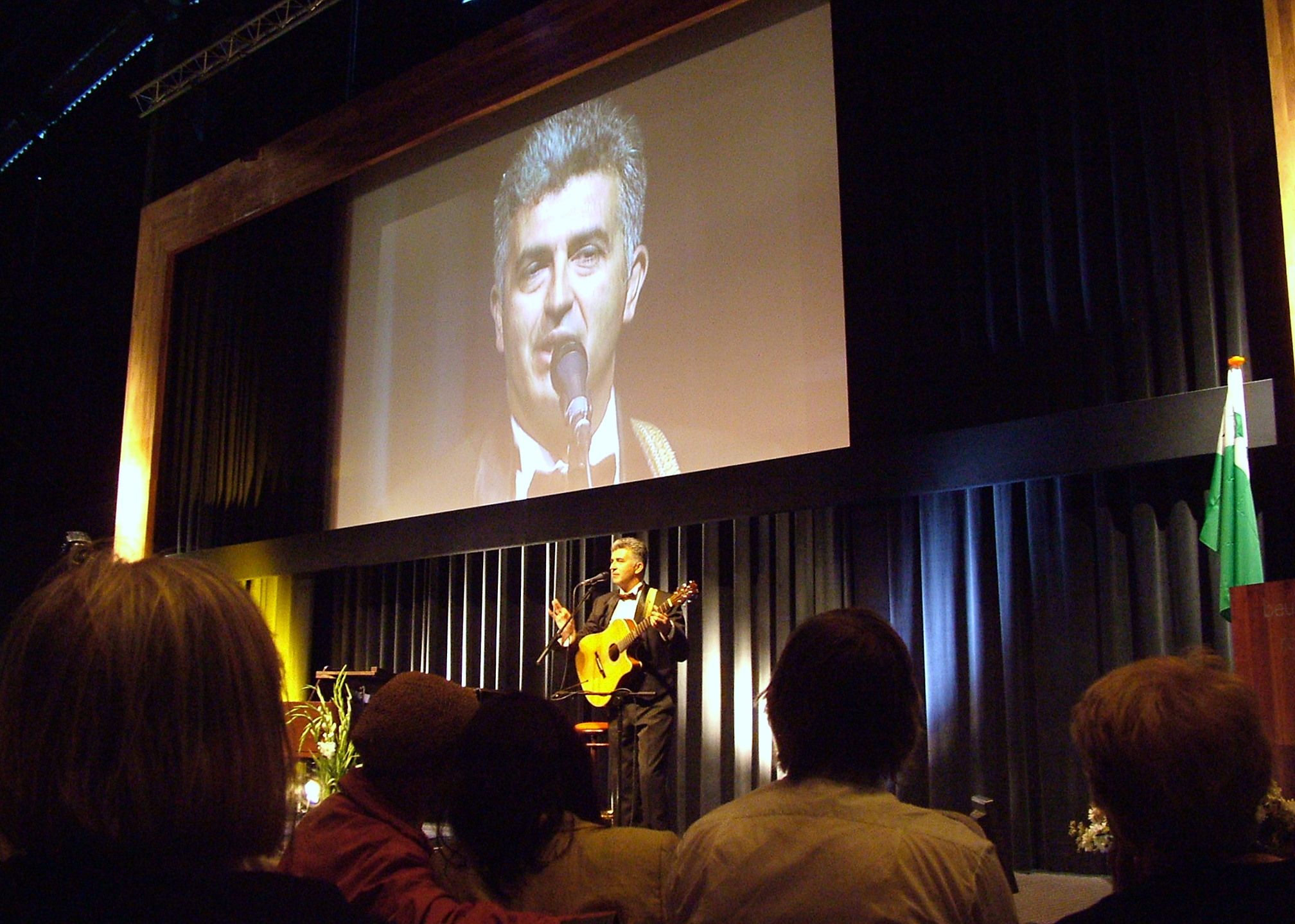
The Serbian actor Sasha Pilipovic presents his cabaret at the World Congress of Esperanto, Rotterdam 2008

Internacia Televido, an internet television channel, began broadcasting in November 2005. Australia is the hotspot of much of the organization behind Esperanto television. Several short films have been produced, and at times plays have been recorded "for television". As of July 2003, the Esperanto-language Wikipedia lists 14 films and 3 short films.

In 2011, Academy Award-nominated director Sam Green (The Weather Underground) released a new documentary about Esperanto titled The Universal Language (La Universala Lingvo), tracing the history of Esperanto. It is known for excellent camera quality and filming sense, as well as being a good "absolute introduction" to what Esperanto is, but is criticized as too short at 30 minutes.

The American Good Film Festival (La Usona Bona Film-Festivalo) is a short film competition hosted by Esperanto-USA since 2021. The films must be less than five minutes long and entirely in Esperanto with at least ten unique spoken words and a visible required prop which is announced by the host at the beginning of each contest. The festival has produced over 175 short films in Esperanto which can be viewed for free on Esperanto-USA's YouTube channel.

Many more films, cartoons and documentaries that aren't Esperanto originals are simply subtitled in Esperanto and put up on YouTube. Some fan-dubs exist, especially of Disney songs and short scenes.

== Conventions ==
Many people wear their country's traditional clothing to Esperanto conventions, whether or not they would ever wear it in their own country. Swedish people, for example, who usually never wear their traditional clothing in their own country, may still wear traditional clothing for any meeting involving Esperanto speakers.

The World Congress of Esperanto (Esperanto: Universala Kongreso de Esperanto) is held annually in different countries around the world, mostly in Europe. Each convention draws in an average of 1500–3000 attendees, and the best-attended conferences are those held in Central or Eastern Europe, as Esperanto is an option for fulfilling mandatory foreign-language requirements in Hungarian schools, and the creator of Esperanto came from Poland (see statistics at World Congress of Esperanto).

== Gufujo ==
A gufujo is a makeshift café in a rented space or private home, in which Esperanto coins or voucher-like items as well as real money are used to pay for food and drink. Live music, poetry reading, or literature reading are usual activities. This custom arose in 1995 as an alternative to the more usual custom of after-convention partying at a bar.

== Pasporta Servo ==
An organisation called Pasporta Servo coordinates free couchsurfing and homestays for Esperanto speakers, in which hosts and guests are encouraged to speak only Esperanto with each other.

== Food ==
As Esperanto speakers are from all over the world, and families whose children speak Esperanto natively usually have parents from two different countries, recipes incorporating elements from different countries are naturally born. Traditional foods are also enjoyed in settings where a native wouldn't normally mix or eat them.

One cookbook is Internacie kuiri “Cooking Internationally” by Maria Becker-Meisberger, published by FEL (Flemish Esperanto League), Antwerp 1989, ISBN 90-71205-34-7. Another is Manĝoj el sanigaj plantoj “Meals from Healthy Vegetable Dishes” by Zlata Nanić, published by BIO-ZRNO, Zagreb 2002, ISBN 953-97664-5-1.

Some Esperanto periodicals, such as MONATO, include recipes from time to time.

== Zamenhof Day ==
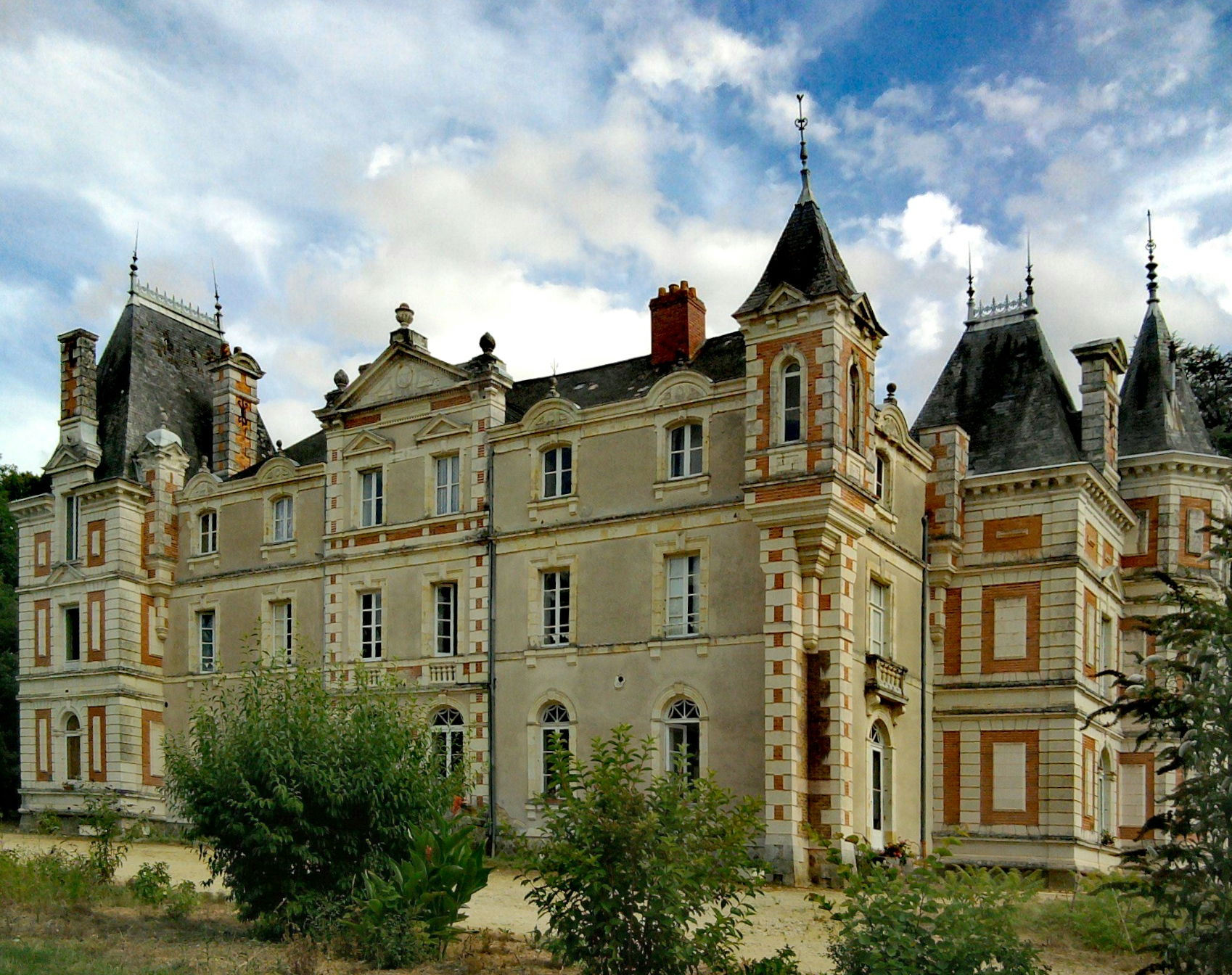
Castle of Grésilion, an Esperantist cultural center in France

On December 15 (L. L. Zamenhof's birthday), Esperanto speakers around the world celebrate Zamenhof Day, sometimes called Book Day. It's a common goal to have a book written in Esperanto published on or by that day, as Zamenhof was a strong advocate of the idea that in order to spread Esperanto around the world, its speakers need to create a large body of literature.

The poem La Espero is the unofficial Esperanto anthem and has a traditional tune. Most Esperanto speakers know the anthem by heart and it is often sung at conventions. Other poems by Zamenhof, Ho, mia kor' (1887) and La vojo (1896), are also well-known in Esperanto culture and often quoted in whole or in part. Some distichs of La vojo, in particular, have become proverbial (e.g. Eĉ guto malgranda, konstante frapante, traboros la monton granitan “Even a small drop, by constantly hitting, will pierce the mountain of granite” as a metaphor for unyielding perseverance).

== Religion ==
Esperanto has had an influence on certain religious traditions (Oomoto, Baháʼí Faith, etc., see Esperanto and religion). While some Esperantists subscribe to these beliefs, they are not necessarily common, and are neither required nor encouraged by any Esperanto groups.

== See also ==
- Esperanto literature
- Esperanto music
- Esperanto flag
- Esperanto in popular culture
- Native Esperanto speakers
- List of Esperanto speakers
- Interhelpo
- Zamenhof-Esperanto object
- Esperanto profanity
- Esperanto - Lingvo Arta (EoLA)
