= List of Esperanto-language films =

The following is a list of Esperanto-language films including features and documentaries. Esperanto was created in the late 1870s and early 1880s.

== Feature films ==
There are four feature films known to have been shot exclusively in the constructed language Esperanto. Both Angoroj (Agonies) and Incubus were shot in the 1960s, and both were long thought lost until restorations emerged in the 2010s.

Angoroj was produced in France in 1964 and directed by Atelier Mahé. It runs approximately one hour and its story involves murder. After a restoration and home video release (in the PAL format) in Switzerland, the film became unavailable until 2019. Little detailed information about Angoroj is available, except that the cast included some proficient Esperantists, including Raymond Schwartz, who also directed skits for Parisian Esperanto cabarets.

The second feature was the 1965 American production Incubus, a low-budget black-and-white horror film directed by the creator of the television series The Outer Limits and starring William Shatner. Though the film is admired for its stark artistry, many Esperantists find that the actors spoke with poor pronunciation.

The 2006 film Gerda malaperis! (Gerda Disappeared!) and 2007 film La patro (The Father) were produced by the Brazilian Esperanto film production company Imagu-filmoj.

== Documentaries ==
Earlier examples of Esperanto in film consist mainly of old newsreel and documentary footage, some dating back as early as 1911, when the seventh international Esperanto conference was held in Antwerp, Belgium. The funeral of Esperanto creator L. L. Zamenhof in 1917 was filmed. French cinema sync sound pioneer, Léon Gaumont, made a short film about a Procession of supporters of Esperanto. In 2011, Academy Award-nominated director Sam Green (The Weather Underground), released a new documentary in 2011 about Esperanto titled The Universal Language (La Universala Lingvo). This 30-minute film traces the history of Esperanto.

== Films of Christopher Mihm ==
Starting with Attack of the Moon Zombies, Christopher Mihm has dubbed eight of his self-described "new old good bad" films into Esperanto:

- The Monster of Phantom Lake
- Attack of the Moon Zombies
- House of Ghosts
- The Giant Spider
- The Late Night Double Feature
- Danny Johnson Saves The World
- Demon with the Atomic Brain
- Queen of Snakes

== Use of Esperanto in film and television ==
- 1924: The silent film The Last Laugh, directed by F.W. Murnau from a screenplay by Carl Mayer, features street signs, posters, and shop signs written in pseudo-Esperanto.
- 1926: Frivolinas is a collection of numbers from three variety shows joined by a flimsy plot. It was a Spanish silent film that would be shown with live music. In the 1999 restoration by Luciano Berriatúa, after the national anthems of ten countries, the Esperanto anthem La Espero plays along the final credits.
- 1931: The Esperanto novel Mr. Tot Aĉetas Mil Okulojn, written by Polish author Jean Forge and published in this year, was adapted by Fritz Lang as The Thousand Eyes of Dr. Mabuse in 1960. (The film was in German, not Esperanto.) Forge also directed films of his own, at least two of which are known to have been Esperanto productions, Morgaŭ Ni Komencos la Vivon (1934) and Verda Stelo Super Varsovio (1959). It is unknown if either film survives.
- 1939: Idiot's Delight, starring Norma Shearer and Clark Gable, features 'locals' of an unidentified European country speaking Esperanto. The language also appears in written form (e.g., a sign reading Autobuso).
- 1939: Lady of the Tropics, starring Robert Taylor and Hedy Lamarr, contains two Esperanto words, Estas bone ("It's all right"), said by a woman after Taylor apologizes to her for mistaking her for Lamarr.
- 1940: Road to Singapore, starring Bing Crosby and Bob Hope, features a song with Esperanto lyrics sung by a chorus of natives of Kaigoon, a fictional island in the East Indies.
- 1940: The Great Dictator starring Charlie Chaplin, who also wrote and directed the film, deliberately decided to have the signs in the shop windows, of the ghettoized Jewish population, written in Esperanto, instead of German, in order to leave the comparison of Nazi Germany to the audience. Another meaning for its usage is Adolf Hitler's opinion that for the Jews to dominate the world, they will need a universal language such as Esperanto.
- 1964: Angoroj (Agonies). Little detailed information about Angoroj is available, except that the cast included some proficient Esperantists, including Raymond Schwartz, who also directed skits for Parisian Esperanto cabarets.
- 1966: Incubus with William Shatner. The first gothic horror movie filmed entirely in Esperanto, directed by Leslie Stevens.
- 1976: La ciutat cremada (The Burnt City)
- 1980s: The British science fiction comedy Red Dwarf (which began in 1988) is set on a bilingual spaceship where the signs on the walls are written in both English and Esperanto (for example, the corridor on each level is labelled "Level/Nivelo [###]", and a sign in a movie theatre says "Cinema/Kinejo") – but this only lasted for the first two series; afterward a redesign of the sets eliminated the Esperanto. Only one episode (Series 2 episode 1, "Kryten") actually features a significant amount of Esperanto being spoken: in the opening scene, the character of Rimmer is attempting to learn Esperanto from an instructional video and failing miserably (although his underachieving bunkmate Lister can understand it perfectly). In a later episode (Series 5 episode 6, "Back to Reality"), aired in 1992, the crew encounter an "ocean seeding ship" named the SSS Esperanto. Later, when their entire lives are revealed, falsely, to have all been a computer game, the Esperanto translation of Esperanto as "One Who Hopes" is said to have been a clue to use that ship's functioning lasers to defeat the "Despair Squid".
- 1985: Night on the Galactic Railroad, a Japanese anime film (based on the novel by Kenji Miyazawa), all the signs are written in Esperanto, to reflect the distinct but unspecific European ambiance of the town and also as a tribute to Miyazawa's interest in the language.
- 1987: In the film Već viđeno (Déjà Vu), by Serbian director Goran Marković, one of the main character's colleagues is an Esperanto teacher. A few short scenes take place in the Esperanto class. Later the teacher is heckled when he recites from an Esperanto translation of The Mountain Wreath at a school performance.
- 1994: Street Fighter street signs and labels are in Esperanto; also background speech and even the anthem of Shadaloo, sung in the movie, are in Esperanto.
- 1997: Esperanto also makes an appearance in Andrew Niccol's science fiction drama Gattaca, where announcements are read in Esperanto and English.
- 2002: Que Sera, Sera, a Norwegian short film directed and produced by Geir Greni, tells the story of the new president of a fictionalized version of the country's Esperanto association and his attempts to drum up new members for the organization on the eve of its annual convention. Part of the spoken dialogue is in Esperanto.
- 2004: The movie Blade: Trinity takes place in a generic city which writer/director David Goyer nevertheless wanted to represent as bilingual (as many cities are worldwide), so the second language spoken in this nameless city, and visible on most of its signage, is Esperanto.
- 2004: In the Spanish film El coche de pedales, one of the main characters is a teacher of Esperanto. There are some scenes in which he greets people with "Saluton" or "Dankon", and a scene of one of his lectures, in which he reads a tale in Esperanto.
- 2004: In the Korean amateur animation named Esperanto directed by Zacho Oh – which received a prize in the Digital Content Grand Prix – the final sentence that can be heard in the film is in Esperanto.
- 2004: On the Nickelodeon animated show Danny Phantom a limited run character named Wulf was featured who spoke exclusively in Esperanto.
- 2005: A short film named Esperanto was released, with scenes in French and Esperanto.
- 2005: Casarosa is a film by the First Channel of Russian television. The three-part film is a detective story, based on the novel by Leonid Yuzefovich, about events taking place in an Esperanto club in the 1920s. In some scenes people speak and sing in Esperanto, or discuss it in Russian.
- 2009: A short film Senmova in Esperanto directed by Tugce Sen.
- 2010: In the movie Superman/Batman: Apocalypse a mix of Esperanto and gibberish is used as the Kryptonian language.
- 2011: The short animated film Ĉapeloj contains no spoken dialogue, and instead employs the use of visual gags that are based on puns found in Esperanto. Animated and produced by Simmon Keith Barney.
- 2012: The Japanese animated film Doraemon: Nobita and the Island of Miracles—Animal Adventure of the Doraemon series has several characters speaking Esperanto until Doraemon produces a translating device.
- 2013: In the Japanese anime film Patema Inverted, the ending theme, Patema Inverse, is sung in Esperanto.
- 2014: In 12th episode ("Diggs") in season 25 of The Simpsons, Principal Skinner says a few phrases in Esperanto.
- 2016: In the movie Captain Fantastic the two daughters speak fluent Esperanto during the bus ride to the city.
- 2017: In a season 15 episode of Red vs. Blue, it is revealed Simmons learned Esperanto in an effort to communicate with Lopez, who only speaks Spanish. Several of Simmons's lines in the episode are in Esperanto.
- 2020: In the movie Rose Island, it is decided to use Esperanto as the official language of the Republic when looking for a language to sustain the international recognition of the would-be microstate.
- 2024: The short film Himalia directed by Clara Milo and Juliette Lossky has all spoken dialogues in Esperanto.

== See also ==
- Esperanto in popular culture
