= Reta Vortaro =

Online Esperanto dictionary

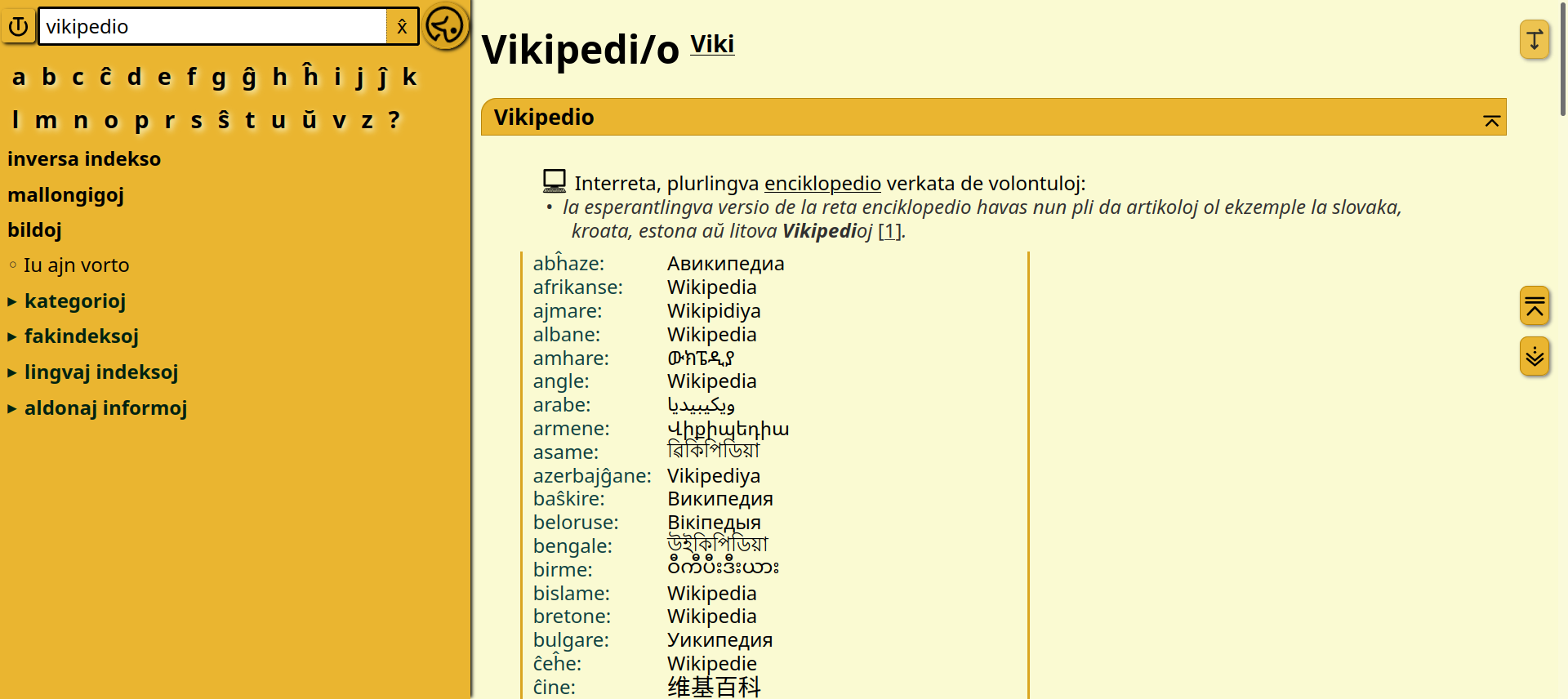
- Page from ReVo shows “Vikipedio” ("Wikipedia").
- Website type: Multilingual online dictionary
- Available in: Esperanto
- Creator: Wolfram Diestel
- Website: reta-vortaro.de/revo/
- Commercial: No
- Registration: Required to make edits
- Launched: 1997
- Current status: Active
- Content licence: GPL

Reta Vortaro ("Internet Dictionary", often known by the Esperanto short form ReVo) is a general-purpose multilingual Esperanto dictionary for the Internet. Each of the dictionary's headwords is defined in Esperanto, along with additional information, such as example sentences, to help distinguish the subtle shades of meaning that each particular word form may have.

Headwords also have translation equivalents in various national languages. Over 60 percent of the headwords have French, German, Russian, Hungarian and/or English translations; over half the words have Dutch, Slovak, Czech, Polish and/or Belarusian translations; and over 30 percent of the words have Spanish, Portuguese and/or Catalan translations.

Italian, Bulgarian, Romanian, Persian, Indonesian, Swedish, Breton and several other languages are also represented, though with smaller numbers of Esperanto headwords. In addition to indices of headwords linking to the various national languages represented, Reta Vortaro also has multiple thematic indexes, a thesaurus and a bibliography of sources consulted.

== History ==
The project was initiated at the end of 1997. The original purpose had been to create an electronic version of the massive dictionary known as Plena Ilustrita Vortaro de Esperanto (1970 and 2002 editions), but due to a lack of interest on the part of the PIV editors, at least partly due to concerns at the time over harming sales of the printed volume — since alleviated, as PIV now has both a reprinted paper edition and a free online version — the Reta Vortaro project changed its focus to creating a separate Internet-use dictionary. One of its major sources is the Plena Vortaro de Esperanto (1930, with the 1953 supplement of Gaston Waringhien).

== Crowd-sourced editing ==
Contributions are added through an e-mail editing server, for which anyone can register. Lexical items are formulated in XML. Editorial discussion takes place via the mailing list. The content and the tools are licensed through the GNU General Public License (GPL).

The many differences between definitions and translations provided by the PIV and by ReVo are clarified by an understanding of various "language policies". While the PIV tries to create a complete dictionary by proposing Esperanto terminology for previously missing words in general usage and even to try to prescribe and correct de facto language use through its definitions, the purpose of ReVo is to record and describe Esperanto as it is actually used. ReVo demands that volunteer editors provide two or more sources for a newly cited word, at least one of which is not from a dictionary.

== Evolution of Reta Vortaro ==
Various "snapshots" of ReVo's development have been taken over time.

- In February 2004, the online dictionary contained for its headwords 8,473 main articles as well as 17,825 forms derived from the root form by the basic rules of Esperanto word formation and carrying 23,457 distinct shades of meaning. From the start there were also a large number of words with natural-language equivalents for the Esperanto headwords: 25,878 in Russian; 23,891 in German; 19,643 in French; 15,500 in Dutch; and 14,713 in Hungarian, along with other languages, of course.
- Three years later, headwords included 9,533 main articles as well as 21,189 forms derived from the root form and 27,124 distinct senses. The numbers of translations had increased as well: 31,228 in Russian; 30,931 in Hungarian; 29,867 in French; 26,149 in German; 21,206 in Belarusian and 16,611 in Dutch.
- As of 2010, headwords included 10,242 main articles as well as 22,979 forms derived from the root form and 29,124 distinct senses. The numbers of translations had again increased: 31,932 in French; 31,916 in Hungarian; 31,765 in Russian; 28,974 in German; 21,881 in Dutch and 21,281 in Belarusian. Two other languages had made respectable gains as well, with Polish at 18,653 and English at 18,169.
- By mid-November 2012, headwords included 10,756 main articles as well as 24,426 forms derived from the root form and 30,677 distinct senses. There were 34,075 terms translated into French; 32,117 in Russian; 32,101 in Hungarian; 29,374 in German; 21,985 in Dutch and 21,316 in Belarusian. Polish, at 20,889, and English, at 20,438, had finally surpassed the 20,000 mark in numbers of translations.
- By July 2016, headwords included 11,555 main articles as well as 26,820 forms derived from the root form and 33,251 distinct senses. Ten languages each had more than 20,000 word senses translated, and 14 additional languages had more than 1,000 terms each.
- By December 2020, headwords included 12,223 main articles as well as 28,942 forms derived from the root form and 35,801 distinct senses. Ten languages each had more than 20,000 word senses translated, and 15 additional languages had more than 1,000 terms each.
- By January 2023, headwords included 12,416 main articles as well as 29,900 forms derived from the root form and 37,299 distinct senses. Twelve languages each now had more than 20,000 word senses translated, and 22 additional languages had more than 1,000 terms each. Thus there were 44,551 terms translated into German; 42,207 in French; 34,343 in Polish; 34,193 in Ukrainian; 33,582 in Belarusian; 33,2241 in Russian; 31,617 in Hungarian; 31,034 in Czech; 29,277 in English; 24,653 in Slovak; 23,881 in Dutch and 20,010 in Spanish. As well, Portuguese, Catalan, Romanian and Italian each had over 10,000 translations of Esperanto terms.

In addition, the dictionary had large thematic vocabulary subsets, with geography at 1298 words; mathematics at 1,290; zoology at 1,108; politics, sociology and administration at 1,069; botany at 1018; medicine and pharmacy at 809; economics, finance and commerce at 762; technology at 620; cooking at 564; chemistry and biochemistry at 510; computer science at 497; music at 491; history at 446; etc.

== Examples ==
One who knows the Esperanto root-form of a word (for nouns, this is the word without the -o ending; for adjectives, the word without the -a ending) can look up a web page giving the Esperanto word's meanings, along with related words and example sentences.

- Thus, at reta-vortaro.de/revo/art/pilk.html one can find the meaning of pilko (ball), along with the derived forms piedpilkado (Association football or soccer) and piedpilko (soccer ball); korbopilkado (the sport of basketball) and korbopilko (the ball used in that game); manpilkado (handball, the game) and manpilko (the ball used for playing handball); and flugpilkado (the sport of volleyball) and flugpilko (the ball used in volleyball). The page also shows equivalents for the word pilko in English ("ball"), as well as in 17 other languages.
