= Esperanto in popular culture =

References to Esperanto, a constructed language, have been made in a number of films and novels. Typically, this is done either to add the exotic nature of a foreign language without representing any particular ethnicity, or to avoid going to the trouble of inventing a new language. In science fiction, Esperanto is sometimes used to represent a future in which there is a more universally spoken language than exists today.

== In English-language media ==
=== Film ===
- The population of the unnamed fascist nation—geographically located where Italy is—in Idiot's Delight (1939), speaks Esperanto. The film includes conversation, signage, and songs in Esperanto, albeit with some errors.
- In Night Train to Munich (1940), a sailor speaks Esperanto.
- In The Great Dictator (1940), many signs are in Esperanto.
- In Road to Singapore (1940), the natives sing in Esperanto.
- In Ball of Fire (1941), Barbara Stanwyck sings "Drum Boogie," a hep swinger, chock full of WWII-era slang. The lyrics include the word "mortigate", from Esperanto mortigi (kill), meaning something like “to die for” or "killer" in what must have been well-enough known slang at the time to be recognizable by at least a few.
- In Tiny Toon Adventures: How I Spent My Vacation (1992), the following dialogue ensues:
  - Buster Bunny: You see Babs, I told you music was the universal language!
  - Babs Bunny: And here I thought it was Esperanto!
- In Street Fighter (1994), the signs and posters in Shadaloo are in Esperanto, although written in a faux-Thai Latin typeface.
- In Gattaca (1997), announcements within the Gattaca building are given in Esperanto.
- Blade: Trinity (2004) is set in a generic city which writer and director David S. Goyer wanted to represent as bilingual, as many cities are worldwide, so the second language spoken in the nameless city, and visible on most of its signage, is Esperanto. In addition, a character in Blade is seen watching the Esperanto-language film Incubus, and the Esperanto flag doubles for the local city flag.
- In Superman/Batman: Apocalypse (2010), the Kryptonian language spoken by Superman and Supergirl is depicted by simple phrases in Esperanto (Bonan nokton) mixed with gibberish.
- In Captain Fantastic (2016), Ben's daughters speak Esperanto among other foreign languages. The following phrases are used:
  - Mankas al mi Panjo. (I miss Mom.)
  - Mi deziras ke Panjo povus reveni hejmen ĝuste nun. (I wish Mom could come home right now.)
  - Domaĝe. (Too bad.)
  - Jes, domaĝe. (Yes, too bad.)
  - Ni rajtas paroli en kiu ajn lingvo kiun ni volas. (We have a right to speak in whatever language we want.)
  - Ne gravas. (It's not important.)
  - Ne estas nia kulpo ke vi ne povas paroli Esperanton. (It's not our fault that you cannot speak Esperanto.)
- Mexican filmmaker Alfonso Cuarón owns a production company called Esperanto Filmoj, which has produced films such as Pan's Labyrinth and Gravity.

=== Television ===
- In the 18th episode of the first season of Mary Tyler Moore, Phyllis claims she saw a truck when going to her Esperanto class.
- In the fourth episode of the second series of Peep Show, Mark's inner voice narrates what he thinks the students, from a class he managed to participate in without being registered, do as the "inner circle" of society by citing Esperanto as a means to prank call Gore Vidal.
- In Danny Phantom, Wulf is a wolf-like ghost who speaks only Esperanto, however fractured and grammatically incorrect, in the episode. The character Tucker explains to the other main characters what Esperanto is and where it came from, stating that it is "a way for geeks to communicate with other geeks".
- In The Jetsons, George Jetson's daughter, Judy, had to do homework for her modern Esperanto class.
- On the UK sci-fi sitcom Red Dwarf, Esperanto is officially an international language, and all signs on the walls of the ship are written in both English and Esperanto (for example, "Level 147/Nivelo 147"). While this part of the show was prominent in the first two seasons, it was dropped from season 3 onwards. The character Arnold Rimmer also attempts to learn this language – and fails, resulting in phrases like "Could you please send for the hall porter, there appears to be a frog in my bidet" (“Bonvolu alsendi la pordiston, laŭŝajne estas rano en mia bideo”). His subordinate, Dave Lister, is apparently well versed in the language despite a supposed lower level of education, which further infuriates Rimmer.
- Another British comedy, The Last Salute, about the Automobile Association, or 'AA', in the 1960s showed the unit supervisor as dreaming of the new post-war Great Britain and Europe as being a Worker's Paradise of sorts, with Esperanto as the universal language. Despite there being no evidence of this outside of his own aspirations, he persisted in speaking the language to his long-suffering team at briefing sessions, and to the point of conducting lessons.
- On an episode of Saturday Night Live, during the Weekend Update segment, comedian Mike Myers once portrayed the Rolling Stones' singer Mick Jagger with Jagger himself seated beside him portraying bandmate Keith Richards. Jagger answers all questions asked of him in the fake interview with unintelligible mumbling, to which Myers says, "You aren't speaking English, Keith! You're speaking Esperanto, or some sort of language that twins teach each other!"
- In Frasier season 5 episode 6, "Voyage of the Damned", a sleazy lounge singer tells Frasier's producer Roz Doyle that she must be fluent in the "universal language" (meaning love), to which Frasier quips "Oh yes Roz, say something amusing in Esperanto!"
- In a 1969 guest appearance on The Tonight Show Starring Johnny Carson, Jay Silverheels of The Lone Ranger fame appeared in character as Tonto for a comedy sketch with Carson, and claimed Esperanto skills as he sought new employment. The sketch ended with a statement of his ideal situation: "Tonto, to Toronto, for Esperanto, and pronto!"
- In The West Wing episode "Game On", Governor Bob Ritchie made a derogatory reference to Esperanto in his answer to his first question in the Presidential debate. He claimed that President Jed Bartlet wanted the federal Department of Education to require all students to learn supposedly useless, esoteric subjects like Esperanto and Eskimo poetry.
- In a 2008 episode of Phineas and Ferb, "Flop Starz", during a mid-credits scene it is said that the fictional pop song "I'm Lindana and I Wanna Have Fun" has been "remixed and retranslated" into "your favourite languages", including Esperanto.
- During the Simpsons' 2014 episode "Diggs", Principal Skinner reveals that the Springfield Elementary School once had an Esperanto club.
- In the 3rd episode of the 1st season of Lilyhammer "Guantanamo Blues", a kid invited to Jonas's birthday party replies to Frank that he speaks English, German and Esperanto, as well as Norwegian.
- The US television series Resident Alien (2021) uses Esperanto (written backwards in an invented script) for the language of the extraterrestrial.
- In the 3rd episode of the 5th season of "Second City Television (SCTV)" "Melonvote", the municipal elections for the fictional town of Melonville included a ballot initiative that proposed making Esperanto the city's second official language.

=== Literature ===
- Esperanto has been cited as a possible inspiration for George Orwell's Newspeak. Orwell learned of Esperanto in 1927 when living in Paris with his aunt Nellie Limouzin, who was then living with Eugène Lanti, a prominent Esperantist. Esperanto was the language of the house, and Orwell, who had come to Paris in part to improve his French, was obliged to find other lodging. Esperanto sought, especially at first, to reduce the number of root-words that had to be learned, so many words were formed from a single root and a variety of prefixes and suffixes. The opposite of bona ('good' in Esperanto) is malbona ('ungood'), and to intensify it one can say malbonega ('very ungood'). This was a likely inspiration for the vocabulary of Newspeak (which used words like ungood, plusungood and doubleplusungood), although in Orwell's novel, the structure of Newspeak was chosen to limit thought and the possibility of rebellious ideas.
- The 1908 dystopian science fiction novel Lord of the World by Robert Hugh Benson posits a future in which the end of days prophesied in the Bible arrives, heralded by among other things, the coming of the antichrist and the institution of Esperanto as a world language.
- The Stainless Steel Rat novels by Harry Harrison (who was an Esperanto speaker and such a big fan of the language that he included contact details for the British Esperanto Society in the endpages of several of his books) also postulate a future where it is spoken, and a small fraction of the dialogue is in Esperanto.
- The language is used in the setting of Philip José Farmer's Riverworld novels, as well as in stories by Poul Anderson, Mack Reynolds, John Brunner, John Barnes, and other science fiction writers (Harlow 1996).
- In the novel The House of the Spirits by Isabel Allende, Esperanto is believed by Clara the Clairvoyant to be the language of the spirit world along with Spanish.
- In Paulo Coelho's The Alchemist, the lead character studies to become a priest at a seminary in Andalusia where he is first required to learn Esperanto.
- In 1970, Richard Corben wrote and illustrated a fantasy story entitled "Rowlf" (aka "The Story of Rowlf") that was published in Voice of Comicdom issues 16 and 17. The story is about a dog who, through a magic spell gone wrong, is rendered half human/half dog and must rescue his mistress from demonic invaders who all speak Esperanto. The work was reprinted in three parts in Heavy Metal Magazine, issues 32-34 in 1979 and 1980.
- In Philip Reeve's sci-fi novel, Mortal Engines, set thousands of years in the future, inhabitants of the flying town of Airhaven speak "Airsperanto", a clear reference to today's Esperanto.
- In Isaac Asimov's short story Homo Sol, Earth is implied to be a candidate to entry into a galactic federation. The psychologist who delivers the introduction to Earth's parliament does so "in their own language — a simple one which they call Esperanto."
- Esperanto appears in the alternate historical novels A Hand-book of Volapük by Andrew Drummond and The Yiddish Policemen's Union by Michael Chabon.
- The short play "The Universal Language" written by David Ives features and is mostly written in a fictional auxiliary language called Unamunda, which bears a strong resemblance to Esperanto.
- A few passages of James Joyce's Finnegans Wake are written in Esperanto.
- Esperanto is used to represent the native language of Wreath in Brian K. Vaughan's comic book Saga. The language is often referred to as "Blue", as it is lettered in blue type.
- A character in the short story "A Municipal Report" by O. Henry says, "...What did the noisiest project in the world--I mean the building of the tower of Babel-- result in finally? A page and a half of Esperanto in the North American Review."
- In the novel Flies from the Amber by Wil McCarthy, the original colonists of the planet Unua named everything on the planetary system in Esperanto, and some of the dialogues have words in that language.
- Esperanto is the language used as the basis of spells in the magic system of the Magic 2.0 series of novels by Scott Meyer. The language is used because the locals of Medieval England know Latin and nobody knows Esperanto.
- The Marvel Comics supervillain Flag-Smasher is described as being fluent in Esperanto, among other languages.
- In Sarah Waters’ lesbian historical fiction novel The Paying Guests, narrator Frances begins to teach herself Esperanto in Chapter 5 to distract herself from her infatuation with house guest Lillian. She speaks three sentences in Esperanto.
- In The Expanse series of novels by James S. A. Corey, Belter Creole spoken by many characters inhabiting the asteroid belt and the moons of outer planets of the Solar System includes elements of Esperanto, alongside many other languages. In the books, vocabulary used was chosen on the basis of aesthetics and wasn't supposed to form a real language. For The Expanse television show, Belter Creole would be expanded upon by the linguist and polyglot Nick Farmer, who would develop over 1000 words for the show.

=== Music ===
- American composer Lou Harrison, who incorporated styles and instruments from many world cultures in his music, used Esperanto titles or texts in several of his works.
- The New York City-based record label ESP-Disk was originally founded to release Esperanto-based music.
- The musician credits for Blood and Chocolate, a 1986 album by Elvis Costello & the Attractions, were written in Esperanto.
- The Symphony No. 1 of composer David Gaines is subtitled "Esperanto", and features a mezzo-soprano soloist singing in Esperanto. It has been recorded by the Moravian Philharmonic.
- Words and phrases in Esperanto are used several times in the artwork for the Radiohead album OK Computer. It is also used several places on the current version of their website.
- The band They Might Be Giants mentions Esperanto briefly in their song "Alienation's for the Rich", from the album They Might Be Giants.
- Sonic Youth / Jim O'Rourke released an EP called SYR3: Invito Al Ĉielo ("Invitation to Heaven") on Sonic Youth Records (SYR) in 1998, with all titles and credits in Esperanto.
- Michael Jackson uses Esperanto in the beginning of the promotion video for HIStory.
- Pixies use roughly translated Esperanto lyrics in the bridge section of the song Andro Queen from the album Indie Cindy.

=== Video games ===
- Esperanto was used in Castle Infinity, an early MMORPG where the world is populated by creatures who speak "Dinosaur". Throughout the game, characters exclaim "Sin gardi! Estas cerbo suksoso!" which translates as "Look out! It's a Brainsucker!"
- In The Elder Scrolls III: Morrowind, there is an in-game book titled "N'Gasta! Kvata! Kvakis!", meant to be an obscure arcane text on necromancy. The book is written in an altered form of Esperanto. The "arcane tome" is actually part of La Ranetoj, the newsletter of the Stockholm Esperanto Society. The book is also present in The Elder Scrolls IV: Oblivion and The Elder Scrolls V: Skyrim.
- In Sam & Max Save the World, there is an out of business Esperanto bookstore on Sam and Max's street.
- In Sunless Sea, a minor character named the Delightful Adventuress occasionally speaks in Esperanto.
- In the Grand Theft Auto series, beginning with Grand Theft Auto III, there is a car based on the Cadillac Eldorado named Esperanto.
- In I Was a Teenage Exocolonist, the language that characters speak in-universe is Esperanto.
- In Divinity: Original Sin Esperanto is used as the native language of a group of people to help identify them as 'foreign' to the player characters.
- In Metaphor: ReFantazio, the lyrics of multiple songs are chanted in Esperanto by a Buddhist monk.
- In Arknights, Esperanto is majorly featured within the names of abilities for the English translation for Kal'tsit Esperanta

== In Europe ==
- Beginning in 1929, the Swedish satirical magazine Grönköpings Veckoblad published a series of articles about Transpiranto, a parody of Esperanto, with comical translations of well-known Scandinavian songs and poems.
- Esperanto is featured in the Swedish novel Populärmusik från Vittula by Mikael Niemi, published in 2000, and its film adaption, released in 2004. One of the main characters, Niila, learns Esperanto from a radio program during his childhood in the 1960s. Later, at a church service, Niila finds a use for the language. While the church is receiving a translated sermon from a Congolese guest preacher, the translator faints and is taken away. To continue, the priest asks if anyone speaks English, French, Arabic or Esperanto. Niila raises his hand and translates the sermon delivered in Esperanto into Swedish.
- Another Swedish novel that features Esperanto is Fredrik Backman's My Grandmother Asked Me To Tell You She's Sorry, in which the titular grandmother as well as another character, Wolfheart, both speak Esperanto.
- German synthpop band Elektric Music released an album in 1993 entitled Esperanto, whose title track contains several Esperanto phrases spoken using a phoneme generator.
- Italian rapper Lorenzo Jovanotti shows a poster in Esperanto in his music video Ti porto via con me.
- Ukrainian alt-rock band Pichismo plays esperantocore, with lyrics in Esperanto and other constructed languages.

== In Japan ==
- The name of the Japanese beverage Yakult (yakuruto) is derived from jahurto, an Esperanto word for "yogurt" (though jogurto is also widely in use).
- The yaoi manga La Esperança notes that its characters use Esperanto (although, for readers' benefit, it has been translated into English/Japanese/French, etc...). The words on Cecile's letter to Erwin (volume II) can be clearly seen as actual Esperanto.
- The anime Aria the Origination features a song sung in Esperanto, Lumis Eterne ("It shone eternally").
- In the final level of Katamari Damacy, the King of All Cosmos greets the player in Esperanto.
- The introductory video for Final Fantasy XI features Memoro de la Ŝtono ("A Memory of the Stone"), a choral music with lyrics in Esperanto. According to its composer, Nobuo Uematsu, the choice of language was meant to symbolize the developers' hope that their online game could contribute to cross-cultural communication and cooperation. Unlike many similar massively multiplayer games which dedicate individual "copies" of their virtual worlds to players of a specific area or primary language, FFXI is deliberately designed to force players in all regions to share worlds.
- Esperanto is used in the yuri visual novel The Expression Amrilato, where it is called "Juliamo", and uses a slightly altered Latin alphabet. The protagonist wanders into a strange world where Juliamo is the primary language, and gradually learns the language through the help of the love interest and a teacher. The game also includes a study mode where the player can practice basic phrases and grammar.
- The ending theme of the anime film Patema Inverted, Patema Inverse, is sung in Esperanto.
- The anime film adaptation of Night on the Galactic Railroad features captions in Esperanto, as well as other written instances.
- The anime series Fafner in the Azure features an organization who call themselves the Esperantos, whose goal is to promote understanding between humanity and the aliens now inhabiting Earth. The origins of the word and its meaning ("One who hopes") are discussed in Fafner in the Azure: Exodus, and later in Fafner in the Azure: The Beyond, the main antagonist names himself Malespero. ("Despair") Malespero's army is named Benon ("Blessing") and uses propaganda to portray itself as a beneficial force.
- In Guilty Gear: Strive, there is a song named Necessary Discrepancy, which uses Esperanto in some of the lyrics.
- The anime adaptation of Stardust Telepath features a song sung in alien language, which is based on Esperanto with altered alphabet form and pronunciation, Spektro ("Spectrum").
- In Metaphor: ReFantazio, Esperanto is used in-universe and in the vocals of the game's music.

== Films in Esperanto ==
- The earliest film (not of feature length, however) to use the language was titled "Antaŭen!" ("Onwards!"), a silent Esperanto publicity film before World War II.
- There are two instances of feature films being entirely performed in Esperanto. Angoroj (Esperanto for "Agonies"), 1964, was the first feature film to be produced entirely in Esperanto; Incubus (with English and French subtitles), a 1966 black and white horror film directed by Leslie Stevens and starring William Shatner, followed.

== See also ==
- Esperanto culture
- Esperanto literature
- List of Esperanto speakers
- List of Esperanto-language films
