= Abram Kofman =

Russian Esperanto poet (1865–1940)

- Авраам Кофман
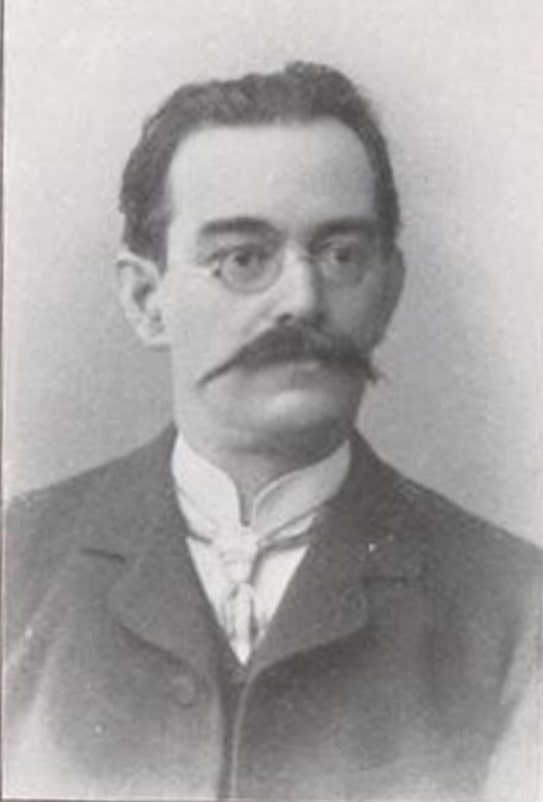
- Kofman in 1906
- Born: 1864–1865; Odesa, Russian Empire
- Died: c. 1940 (aged 74–75)
- Occupations: Bookkeeper, Esperantist, poet
- Writing career
- Language: Esperanto, Russian, Ido, Occidental

Abram Antoni Kofman (Russian: Авраам Кофман; c. 1864–c. 1940), also known as Abraham S. Kofman, was a Russian-Jewish accountant, and poet and translator in several constructed languages. From Odesa, Russian Empire, Kofman learned Esperanto in 1889 and was an early supporter of the language's adoption. He was one of the first Russian Jews to write poetry in Esperanto and has been described by several as a "pioneer". His work appeared in several Esperanto-language magazines and early anthologies, including the Fundamenta Krestomatio. He was the translator of several sections of the Hebrew Bible in both Esperanto and its daughter language, Ido. He was the first Ancient Greek–Esperanto translator, producing a rendition of parts of the Iliad starting in 1895.

Kofman was also involved in the development of the international religion Hillelism by the creator of Esperanto, L. L. Zamenhof in 1901, denouncing it as dangerous to Esperanto. Eventually, Kofman moved away from Esperanto to support Ido, and later Occidental (now Interlingue). He produced works in both languages, including textbooks and poetry. Kofman purportedly died during aerial bombing in Odesa around 1940.

== Esperanto ==
=== Background ===
Kofman was from Odesa, Russian Empire, and was born in 1864-1865. Professionally, he worked as a bookkeeper. He learnt the international auxiliary language Esperanto in 1889, less than two years after it was debuted by Zamenhof in 1887. Ric Berger names him the first in Russia to promote Esperanto; he was one of the first Esperantist Russian Jews and one of three Jewish Esperantists in Odesa by 1902.

Scholars of Esperanto literature ramify three periods: Kofman worked in the First (Esperanto: Unua periodo), comprising writers until the First World War. Tazio Carlevalo identifies three schools of thought during this period: Kofman belonged to the "Slavic School", (Note: Also referred to as the "Slav School" by Geoffrey Sutton and the "Slavia" by Nikolaos Trunte.) active between 1916 and 1920. This was the first main school of Esperanto literature: its writers generally wrote from before the 20th century until 1920. The school may be further divided into two generations: Kofman was a member of the first. Kofman's peers in this group were generally Zamenhof's contemporaries, such as authors Vasilij Devjatnin, Leo Belmont, and Zamenhof's brother Felix Zamenhof. The school of thought sought for stylistic freedom, and Carlevalo notes their "relative abundance of pure lyric voices."

=== Work ===
Kofman wrote both original material as well as translations for several Esperanto periodicals; he wrote in a variety of genres, including satirical epigrams and narrative poetry. He appeared in Zamenhof's 1903 anthology Fundamenta Krestomatio (Fundamental Chrestomathy).A short story was featured in Louis de Beaufront's L'Espérantiste, and he collaborated with the Czech magazine Bohema Esperantisto. Several contributions to La Esperantisto and Lingvo Internacia were made under the pseudonym "Amiko" ("Friend"); although initially believed to be from Zamenhof, they were later discovered to be Kofman's works. In 1896, he planned to publish a collection of poems entitled Voices of People (Voĉoj de Popoloj) in eighteen languages, but it was never released. For the texts in Finnish, Estonian, Hungarian, Japanese, and Mordvin, he asked for assistance from the Finnish Esperantist Gustaf John Ramstedt, incorrectly believing that Ramstedt could speak Japanese. In an open letter in the magazine Lingvo Internacia, Kofman stated that he hoped to eventually have 35-50 languages.

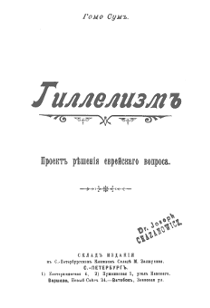
Zamenhof's 1901 brochure for Hilelismo

Kofman was the first Ancient Greek–Esperanto translator, translating Homer's Iliad between 1895 and 1897 as Iliado. He was part of a team of Jewish translators in Odesa which created a translation of the Old Testament into Esperanto, and in 1893 he translated the Book of Esther and the Book of Ruth; Kofman also later translated the Book of Esther into Ido in 1925. In 1902 during the Second World Esperanto Congress, Kofman was elected by the Lingva Komitato (Language Committee) to a commission that corrected errors in the "Universala Vortaro" ("Universal Dictionary") of the Fundamento de Esperanto.

Kofman was a close friend of L. L. Zamenhof, the creator of Esperanto, who communicated with Kofman regarding his ideas for Judaism. On 28 May 1901, Zamenhof sent Kofman a letter (Note: Full text available on Wikisource) about his plans for Hillelism (Hilelismo), his planned version of Judaism that would form an international religion. This included the manuscript form of a brochure for the religion, that Zamenhof would publish later in 1901. Kofman did not read the full brochure, and responded with a letter of disgust, viewing the introduction of a philosophy such as Hillelism dangerous to the reputation of the Esperanto movement; Zamenhof had wanted to use Esperanto as a "neutral language" in the religion. Kofman was one of a number of educated Jews among which Zamenhof allowed the brochure to circulate. He received an overall negative response, particularly from Esperantists in Poland and France.

=== Reception ===
Kofman has received both positive and negative attention. He has been described as a "pioneer" by several, including Julio Baghy and Geoffrey Sutton. István Szerdahelyi writes: "His pioneering work deserves attention from those to come". The hexameter he produced in his translation of the Iliad was criticised by Gaston Waringhien as "unskillful copying", and worse than work by Kálmán Kalocsay. In the 1933 Enciklopedio de Esperanto, Julio Baghy described Kofman as an artistic translator, writing:

Liaj stilo kaj tradukmaniero distingiĝas per arta simpleco kaj viva klareco. Lia pionira laboro meritas atenton de la posteuloj. En la komenca periodo de la literatura lingvo li vekis admiron per sia esprimkapableco.
His style and manner of translation are distinguished by artistic simplicity and vivid clarity. His pioneering work deserves attention by the coming [Esperantists]. In the initial era of the literary language he drew admiration for his capacity of expression.

== Post-Esperanto ==
La Literaturo en Ido [Literature in Ido]

Nia linguo, per sa konstanta [sic] devlopo, divenas sempre plu richa, do sempre plu apta a literatural uzado.

Our language, by its constant development, will become ever richer, thus ever more apt for literary use.

— Abram Kofman, November 1910 in La Belga Sonorilo

Although in 1894, Kofman was one of 157 Esperantists who voted against a reform of Esperanto by Zamenhof, in 1907, he shifted his allegiance from Esperanto to Ido: Idists have used the 1894 reform to support the validity of their movement. Ido was introduced by the Delegation for the Adoption of an International Auxiliary Language, and around a tenth of Esperantists would change movement alongside him. He would later come to support Edgar de Wahl's Interlingue (Occidental), and was author of a later-destroyed manuscript of a Russian-Occidental dictionary. Kofman translated poetry into Occidental; a translation of a poem by Ivan Krylov by Kofman appeared in the magazine International magazine of stenography (Occidental: Revúe internationale de sténographie). In 1979, István Szerdahelyi called Kofman "apparently the only one to have written poetry in three [spoken] constructed languages."

Kofman's date of death is uncertain, but is held to be around 1940. A message in the Occidental-language magazine Cosmoglotta records him as having died "just before the war"; he was reported to have died during aerial bombing in 1940. (Note: Beginning only on 22 July 1941, Odessa was bombed heavily by the German air force during the seventy-three-day Siege of Odessa conducted under Operation Barbarossa.)

== Bibliography ==
Works

- Kofman, Abram; de Beaufront, Louis (1896). Pri la verbigado en L. I. [Concerning verb conjugation in International Languages] (in Esperanto).
- ——— (1907). "Kristino, pretigu la liton!" [Christina, make the bed!]. Lingvo Internacia (in Esperanto).
- ——— (1910). Учебник международного языка Идо [Učebnik meždunarodnago jazyka Ido; English: Textbook of the International Language Ido] (in Russian). Odessa.
- ——— (1910). Словарь международного языка Идо [Slovar' meždunarodnogo jazyka Ido; English: Dictionary of the International Language Ido] (in Russian). Odessa.
- ——— (1925). Nova varianti di antiqua temo / La Libro pri Esther [New variants on an ancient theme / The Book of Esther] (PDF) (in Ido). Stockholm: Per Ahlberg.

Poems (selection)

- Kofman, Abram (year unknown). Filino de Iftah [Jephthah's daughter] (in Esperanto)
- ——— (year unknown). Malpli kaj Multpli [Much less and Much more] (in Esperanto)
- ——— (1930). Criterie [Criteria] (in Occidental)

Translations

- Homer; Kofman, Abram (1895–97). Iliado [Iliad] (in Esperanto). Nuremberg: W. Tümmel. cantos 1-9.
- von Goethe, Johann Wolfgang; ——— (1900). "La kanto de Margareto" [The song of Margaret]. Faust. Sinfonia magazine (in Esperanto). Moscow.
- Byron, George; ——— (1896). Kain, Mistero [Cain: A Mystery] (in Esperanto). Nuremberg: W. Tümmel.
- Heine, Heinrich; ———; Gernet, Vladimir [in Esperanto] (1897). Pentraĵoj el vojaĝo [Paintings from a journey] (in Esperanto). Nuremberg: W. Tümmel.
- Beaumarchais, Pierre; ——— (1898). Edziĝo de Figaro [The Marriage of Figaro] (in Esperanto). Nuremberg: W. Tümmel. Act One.
- Stanchinskiy, A. P.; ——— (1928). Lenin montras a ni la voyo [Lenin shows you the way] (in Ido). Leipzig.

== Footnotes ==
=== Sources ===
- Künzli, Andreas (2010). L.L. Zamenhof (1859-1917): Esperanto, Hillelismus (Homaranismus) und die "jüdische Frage" in Ost- und Westeuropa (in German). Otto Harrassowitz Verlag. ISBN 978-3-447-06232-9. Archived from the original on 20 November 2023.
- Szerdahelyi, István [in Esperanto] (1979). "Antoni Kofman". Krestomatio de esperanta literaturo: tekstoj, dataro, bibliografio [Chrestomathy of Esperanto literature: texts, dates, biographies] (in Esperanto). Budapest: Tankönyvkiadó. pp. 373–378.

=== Further reading ===
- Delcourt, Marcel; Amouroux, Jean [in Esperanto] (2000). Abraham S. Kofman: kolekto de poezioj: lia vivo [Abraham S. Kofman: collection of poems: his life] (in Esperanto). publisher unknown.
