= Plena Vortaro de Esperanto =

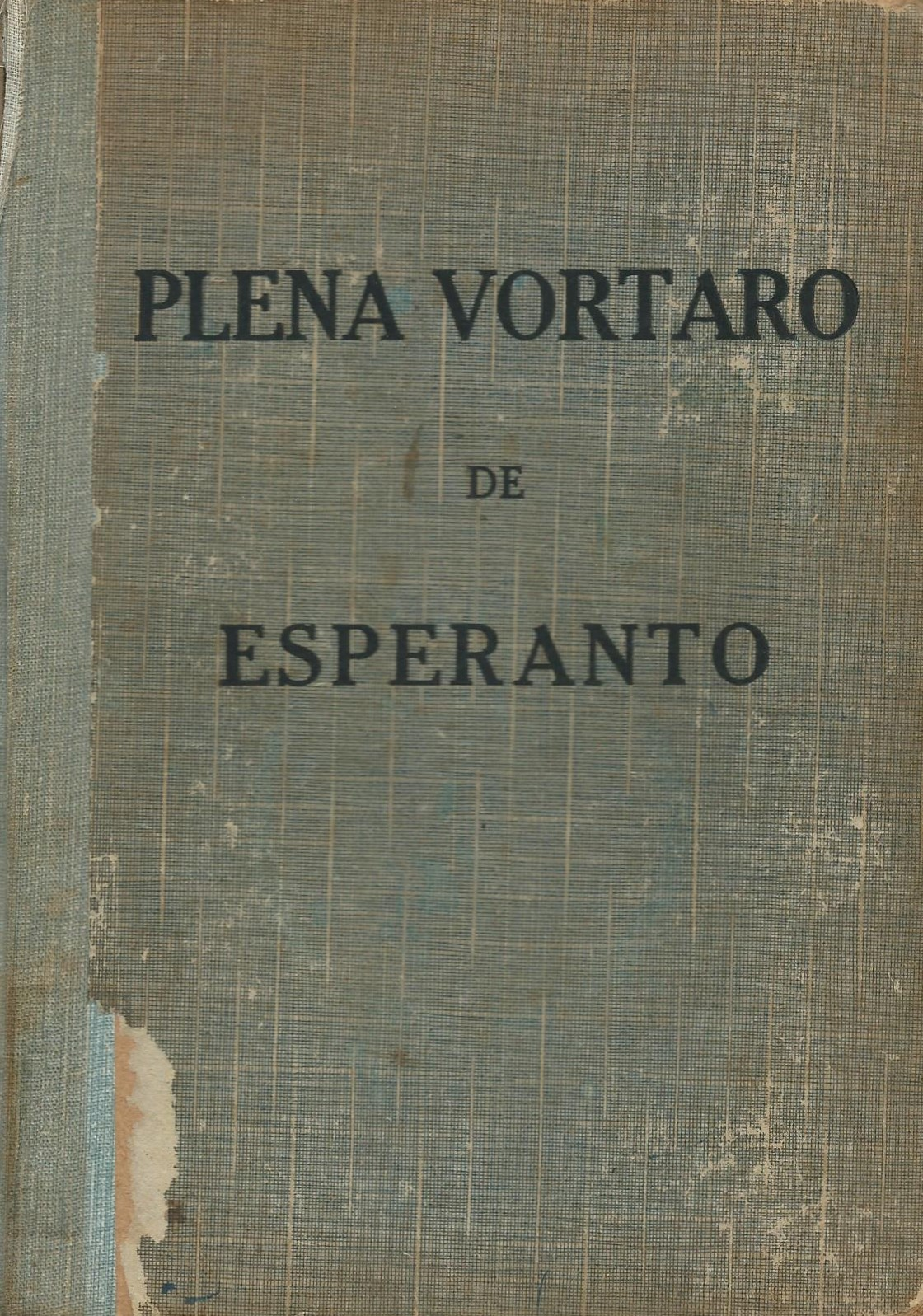
- Publication date: 1930

Plena Vortaro de Esperanto (PV; English: Complete Dictionary of Esperanto) was a monolingual dictionary of the Esperanto language first published by the Sennacieca Asocio Tutmonda (SAT) in 1930, largely considered the first truly comprehensive dictionary written entirely in Esperanto.

== History ==
French academic Émile Grosjean-Maupin was the original chief editor of the PV, with additional contributions over the years from Albert Esselin, Salomon Grenkamp-Kornfeld, and Gaston Waringhien.

PV was first published in 1930. Between 1930 and 1996, SAT published 11 editions of the PV, but following the revised and corrected second edition of 1934, revisions over the decades were infrequent. The most significant post-1934 addition was a 63-page supplemental section contributed by Gaston Waringhien to the fourth edition in 1953. The 1934 edition included 6,900 roots, while Waringhien's supplement added an extra 966.

== Influence ==
Widely lauded upon its first appearance, the Plena Vortaro has largely been superseded by its successor, the Plena Ilustrita Vortaro de Esperanto (PIV), which first appeared in 1970 and is now considered the standard reference dictionary of the language. However, in addition to forming the foundation of the PIV, the PV is also the basis for the Reta Vortaro online dictionary launched in 1997, as well as many bilingual Esperanto dictionaries still in use.

== See also ==
- Vortaro de Esperanto
- Plena Ilustrita Vortaro de Esperanto
