= Michel Duc-Goninaz =

French Esperantist (1933–2016)

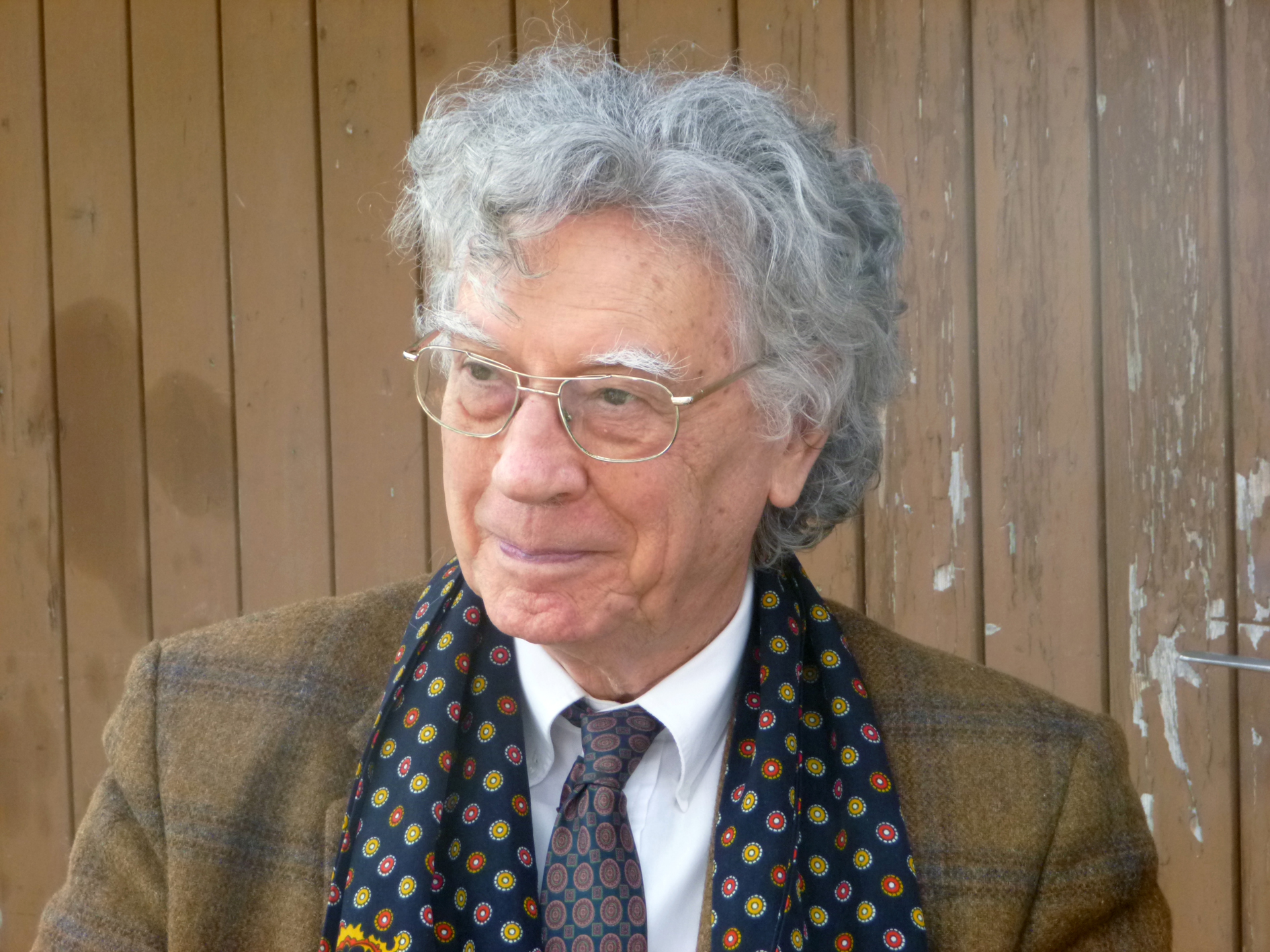
Michel Duc Goninaz

Michel Duc Goninaz (6 September 1933 – 26 March 2016) was a French Esperantist known worldwide for his 2002 revision of La Plena Ilustrita Vortaro de Esperanto (English: Complete Illustrated Esperanto Dictionary).

A member of the World Esperanto Youth Organization (TEJO) during the 1950s, he served as co-editor of La Folieto, distributed mainly among young Esperantists of Île-de-France. In 1956 he married Arlette Lecourtois. He played a role in the 1964 Esperanto-language feature film Angoroj.

Notably, he compiled Vocabulaire Espéranto (Laŭtema esperanta franca vortareto), a thematic French-Esperanto dictionary published by Ophrys in 1971 (2nd edition, 1990), and he adapted Alexander Pushkin's play The Stone Guest into Esperanto as La Ŝtona Gasto. He also translated The Stranger by Albert Camus and Dream Story by Arthur Schnitzler into Esperanto. For many years he was a lecturer in Russian and Esperanto at the University of Provence (Aix-Marseille). Duc Goninaz is now a lecturer at the International Academy of Sciences in San Marino and is a regular contributing editor to the Esperanto-language monthly magazine Monato.

In 2002, he and Claude Roux updated and revised La Plena Ilustrita Vortaro de Esperanto, a monolingual reference dictionary of Esperanto by Gaston Waringhien that had originally been published in 1976. In 2002 the journal La Ondo de Esperanto named Duc Goninaz as Esperantist of the Year in recognition of his work as chief editor for the dictionary revision. Another revised edition (2005) corrected numerous typographical errors, many of which had been noted by Esperanto grammarian and lexicographer Bertilo Wennergren.

== Selected works ==
- 2005. La Plena Ilustrita Vortaro de Esperanto. Paris: Sennacieca Asocio Tutmonda, 1265 pp. ISBN 2-9502432-8-2.

== Articles ==
- 1979. "Esperanto en Perspektivo: Faktoj kaj analizoj pri la internacia lingvo" ("Esperanto in perspective: Facts and analyses about the International Language", Ivo Lapenna, Ulrich Lins, Tazio Carlevaro: Compte-rendu) in Language Problems and Language Planning, 3:1, 40–45.
- 1983 (with Denis Creissels). "Les langues d'U.R.S.S.: Aspects linguistiques et sociolinguistiques" ("Languages of the USSR: Linguistic and sociolinguistic aspects") in Language Problems and Language Planning, 7:2, 198 ff.
- 2000. "L’espérantologie en revue (2)" ("Esperantology in review") in Language Problems and Language Planning, 24:2, 197–200.
