= Vortaro de Esperanto =

Esperanto dictionary by Kazimierz Bein

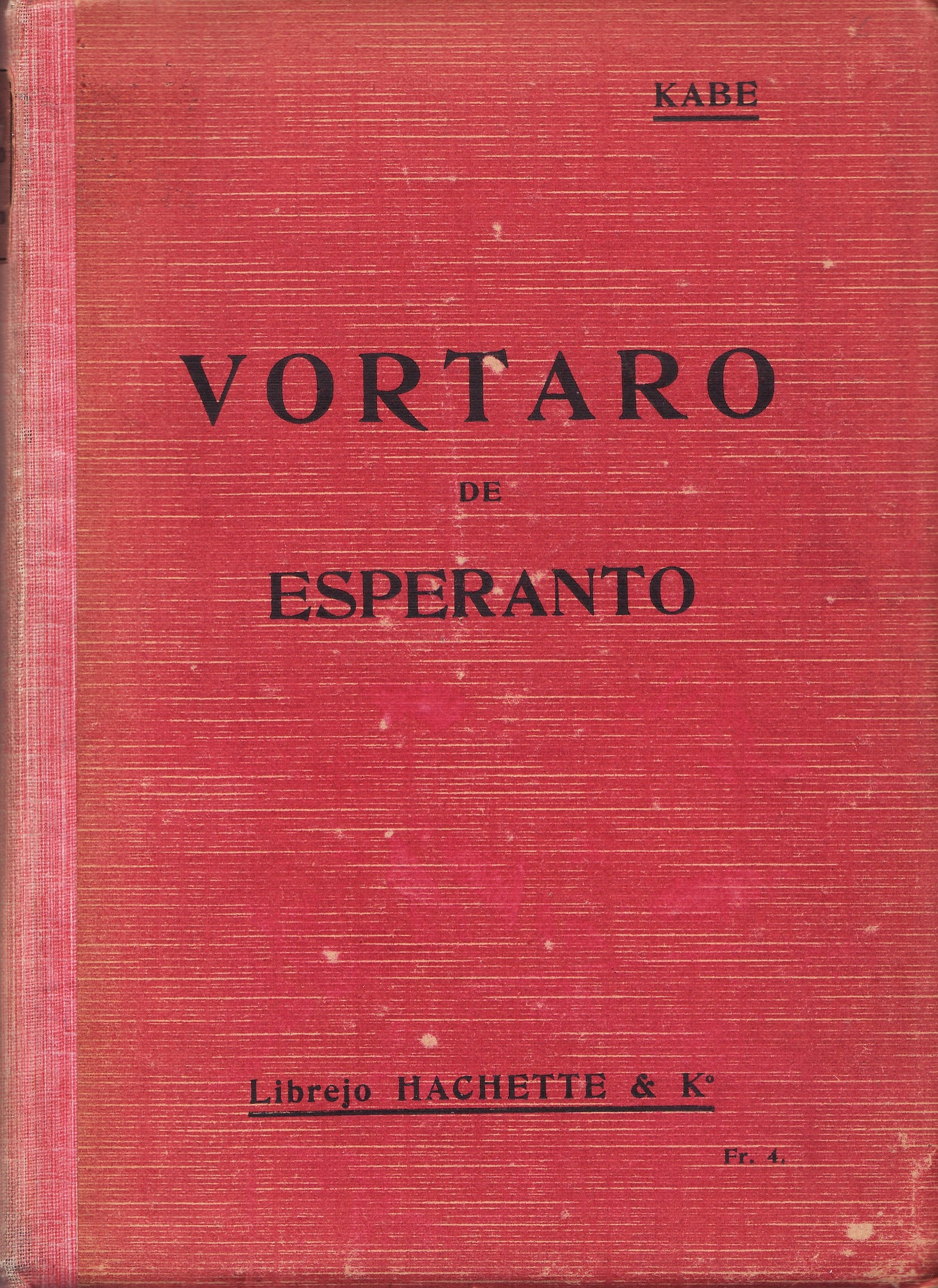
- Author: Kazimierz Bein
- Language: Esperanto
- Genre: Dictionary
- Publication date: 1911
- Pages: 175

The Vortaro de Esperanto (English: Dictionary/Lexicon of Esperanto), published by Kazimierz Bein in 1911, was the first monolingual dictionary ever published in Esperanto.

It is considered the predecessor of the Plena Vortaro de Esperanto, published in 1930, and of the current Plena Ilustrita Vortaro, whose last edition came out in 2020.

The first edition of the Vortaro de Esperanto was published in 1911, the second in 1922 and the third in 1925 (they were, in truth, merely reprints). Overall 8500 copies of the dictionary were printed; the book was 175 pages long.

The only Esperanto dictionary published previously had been the Plena Vortaro, an Esperanto–Esperanto and Esperanto–French dictionary published in 1909 by Émile Boirac; nevertheless, it contained somewhat imprecise definitions in its monolingual section.

Esperantologists consider the Vortaro de Esperanto a valuable source of information about the Esperanto of the early 20th century, given the presence of many archaisms and old-fashioned meanings of words.

== Structure ==
The definitions, brief but clear, contain example phrases. However, the dictionary lacks any etymological references to the first use of a word and does not mention whether or not a word was personally introduced to the language by Zamenhof, or possibly even mentioned in his Fundamento de Esperanto.

The structure has remained essentially the same throughout the Plena Vortaro of 1930 and in the modern Plena Ilustrita Vortaro.

== See also ==
- Plena Vortaro de Esperanto
- Plena Ilustrita Vortaro de Esperanto
