= The Measure of All Things =

- Film poster
- Directed by: Sam Green; Ymusic
- Cinematography: Andrew Black; Peter Sillen
- Music by: Mark Dancigers
- Production companies: ArKtype; C41
- Release date: January 20, 2014 (Sundance)
- Running time: 65 minutes
- Country: United States
- Language: English

The Measure of All Things is a 2014 documentary film co-directed by Sam Green and yMusic. The film had its premiere at the 2014 Sundance Film Festival on January 20, 2014.

== Synopsis ==
The film explores the fascination of people of all over the world with the Guinness Book of World Records.

== Reception ==
The Measure of All Things received positive reviews from critics. Dennis Lim in his review for The New York Times said that "(it is) a singular experience, and a collective one, with the potential for human connection and human error." Susan Gerhard of Fandor, praised the film by saying that "Sam Green has long taken joy at unpacking utopian promises of the past, many deluded, others inspired, and offering them up for re-evaluation and appreciation."
