= Rollen Stewart =

American kidnapper (born 1944)

Rollen Fredrick Stewart (born February 23, 1944), also known as Rock'n Rollen and Rainbow Man, is an American man who was a fixture in American sports culture during the 1970s and 80s. He was best known for wearing a rainbow-colored afro-style wig and, later, holding up signs reading "John 3:16" at stadium sporting events around the United States and overseas. He was convicted of multiple kidnapping charges following an incident in 1992 and is serving three life sentences in California.

== Early life ==
Stewart grew up in Spokane, Washington. Both his parents were alcoholics. His father died when Stewart was 7 and his mother died in a house fire when he was 15, the same year his sister was strangled by a boyfriend. He operated an auto parts store until his wife left him and he closed the shop and moved to the mountains. From 1972 until at least 1977, he operated a ranch with a new wife in Cle Elum, Washington.

== Publicity ==
Stewart and his wife, Linda, were dyeing their hair rainbow colors by 1977 at the latest. A 1977 article in The Everett Herald described the duo as "amateur disco dancers" who traveled to clubs and festivals throughout the Pacific Northwest, including the Portland Rose Festival. Stewart said the couple called themselves "the People Pleasers" and their goal was to make it onto The Gong Show. His first major television appearance was at the 1977 NBA Finals; by the time of the 1979 MLB All-Star Game, broadcasters actively tried to avoid showing him.

After the 1980 Super Bowl, he discovered televangelist Charles R. Taylor and was inspired to become a born again Christian. Shortly thereafter, he began carrying a "John 3:16" sign during his appearances. He "appeared behind NFL goal posts, near Olympic medal stands, and even at the Augusta National Golf Club." At the 1982 Indianapolis 500, he was behind the pits of race winner Gordon Johncock. Stewart would strategically position himself for key shots of plays or athletes. He made no money from this and was homeless for a period. He is believed to have acquired tickets as donations from supportive Christians. Stewart's fame led to a Budweiser beer commercial and a Saturday Night Live parody sketch, in which he was portrayed by Christopher Walken.

Stewart was briefly jailed by Moscow police at the 1980 Summer Olympics. In the late 1980s, he began a string of stink bomb attacks. Targets included Robert Schuller's Crystal Cathedral, the Orange County Register, the Trinity Broadcasting Network, and a Christian bookstore. The stated intent of an attempted attack at the American Music Awards was to show the public that "God thinks this stinks."

== Arrest ==
Stewart was arrested in 1992 after a standoff in a Los Angeles hotel. He had entered a vacant room with two men whom he tried to recruit for a job. The men later fled the scene after he attempted to kidnap a surprised maid who then locked herself in the bathroom. Reportedly, Stewart believed that the Rapture was due to arrive in six days. During the standoff, he threatened to shoot at airplanes taking off from nearby Los Angeles International Airport, and covered the hotel room windows with "John 3:16" placards.

Stewart was charged with eight felonies, including three counts of kidnapping and hostage taking. He rejected a plea deal of 12 years in order to spread his message in open court. He was convicted on all charges and sentenced to three consecutive life sentences. After being sentenced, he began a religious tirade and had to be restrained by bailiffs. Stewart is currently serving three consecutive life sentences in prison on kidnapping charges, He became eligible for parole in 2002, but it was denied. He was also denied parole in 2005, 2008, 2010, 2017, 2019 and 2020. After this conviction, he was found guilty of four stink bomb attacks.

Stewart ran a blog until the time of his parole denial. He is the subject of the 1997 documentary Rainbow Man, directed by Sam Green. In a 2004 interview with ESPN, he admitted that if he had had a chance to do it all over again, he would have taken the plea deal. However, he said that the standoff happened "at the wrong time."

== Personal life ==
Stewart was married four times. In November 1964, he married Suzanne Hoffarth in a Catholic ceremony in a chapel of St. Paul Cathedral in Yakima, Washington. He was next married to Janet Longneeker in Skagit County, Washington in April 1968. Janet was granted a divorce in Pierce County, Washington in October 1971 on the grounds of "burdensome home life." He was married again in a Lutheran ceremony in King County to Linda J. Orff in July 1976 but was divorced by January 1979.

He was most notably married to Margaret Hockridge. The two met at a church in Virginia in 1984. They began traveling across the country together in 1985. While on the road, they married in St. Louis in 1986. During the 1986 World Series, Hockridge said that Stewart tried to choke her for standing in the wrong spot with a "John 3:16" sign. They divorced in 1990, but kept in touch for many years.
