= Esperanto in Poland =

International auxiliary language in Poland

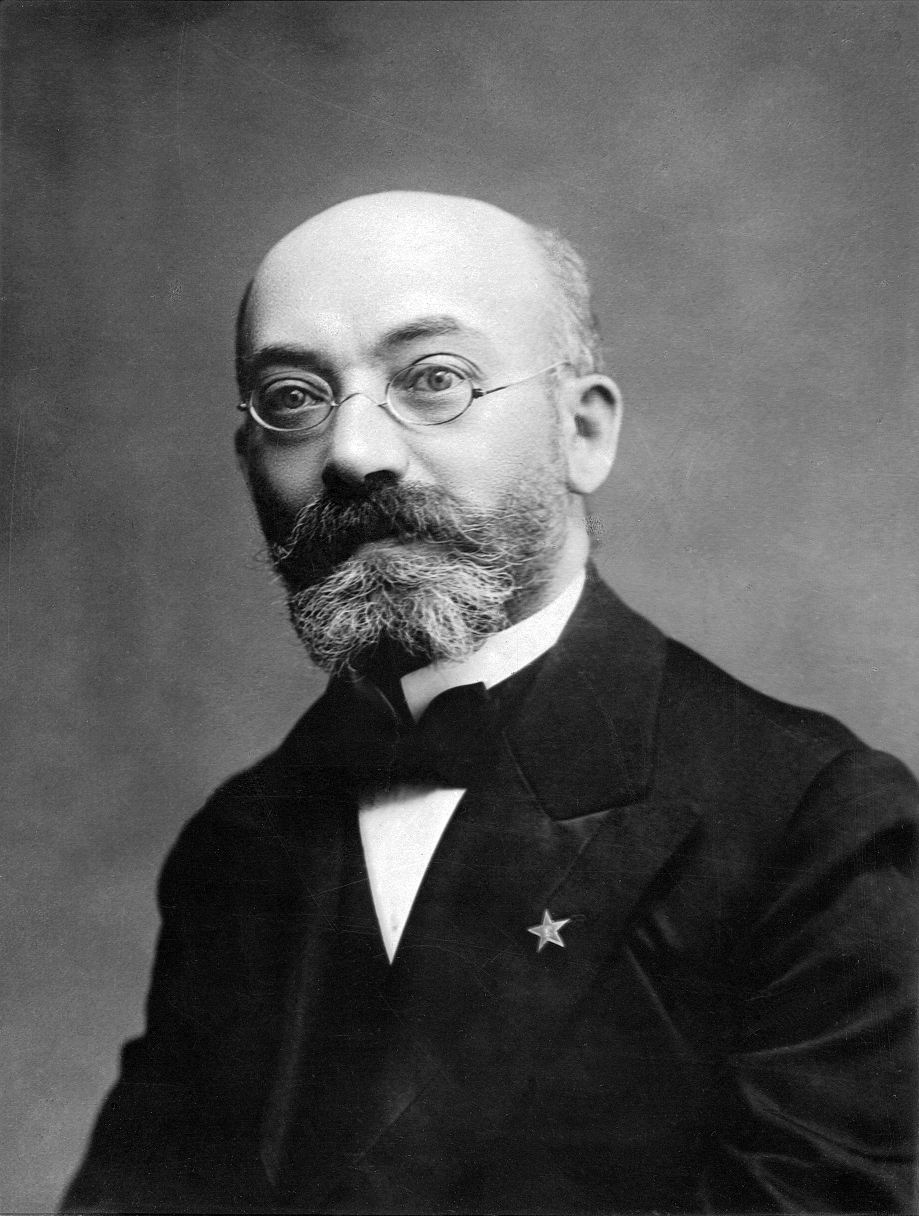
Polish ophthalmologist L. L. Zamenhof, founder of Esperanto.

Esperanto was constructed in Poland by L. L. Zamenhof. It maintained a notable presence in Poland until the Occupation of Poland during World War II and the subsequent Communist rule resulted in the persecution of Esperantists.

== Linguistics ==
Esperanto was primarily constructed from Romance languages, but some words in Esperanto were derived from Polish. These include pilko from the Polish piłka to mean "ball", luti from the Polish lutować to mean "to solder", and ŝelko from the Polish szelki to mean "suspenders". Zamenhof also borrowed from the Polish language's system of honorifics to use the word moŝto as an address to a king, derived from the Polish mość. All of the sounds used in Esperanto are also found in Polish. The name of Poland in Esperanto is Pollando, derived from the English name of Poland.

== History ==
The Esperanto language was constructed in Poland by ophthalmologist L. L. Zamenhof and published in Unua Libro in 1887. Zamenhof's creation of the language was influenced by Poland's political status at the time, having been partitioned between the major east European powers. Polish ophthalmologist Kazimierz Bein was an early Esperanto writer and an advocate of an international league for Esperanto, believing that it would not be persecuted so long as it was not conflated with socialism. Esperanto was often associated with Judaism, and antisemitism led to distrust against Esperantists in Poland. Stanisław Zygmunt Braun and Stanisław Karolczyk founded the Polish Esperanto Association in Łódź. Julian Tuwim was a Polish poet that translated many works to Esperanto. Eugeniusz Matkowski was a Polish violinist that learned Esperanto in 1932 and began writing Esperanto poetry.

Following the invasion of Poland in 1939, Esperantists were persecuted by the Nazis, and in many cases people were killed because they were advocates of Esperanto. Zamenhof's children and grandchildren were specifically targeted by the Nazis due to their connection to the Esperanto movement as well as for their Jewish ancestry. By the end of the Nazi occupation, Esperanto no longer had a significant presence in Poland, and the subsequent Soviet occupation ensured that it was not revived. Esperanto radio broadcasts ended in 1950, and most Esperanto groups were shut down. The Association of Esperantists in Poland continued to exist, and it published the Tra la Mondo kaj Literaturo newsletter. The Esperanto movement was revived in Poland along with other Communist states in 1955. In the 1980s, Esperanto groups in Poland held democratic elections to determine their leadership, preceding the liberalization of the country.

In 2017, Zamenhof's hometown of Białystok declined to commemorate the 100th anniversary of his death.

== Demographics ==
In 1928, there were 4,690 recorded Esperantists in Poland. In 1964, there were 3,493 Esperantists that were members of Esperanto groups in the country.

== See also ==
- Demographics of Poland
- History of Esperanto
- Languages of Poland

== Bibliography ==
- Forster, Peter G. (1982). The Esperanto Movement. ISBN 9789027933997.
- Lins, Ulrich (2016). Dangerous Language — Esperanto Under Hitler and Stalin. Palgrave Macmillan. ISBN 9781349715053.
- Lins, Ulrich (2017). Dangerous Language — Esperanto and the Decline of Stalinism. Palgrave Macmillan. ISBN 9781352000207.
- Sutton, Geoffrey (2008). Concise Encyclopedia of the Original Literature of Esperanto, 1887-2007. Mondial. ISBN 9781595690906.
