= Angoroj =

1964 French feature film in Esperanto

- Title Screen
- Directed by: Jacques-Louis Mahé
- Written by: Atelier Mahé
- Produced by: Jacques-Louis Mahé
- Starring: Michel Duc-Goninaz; Raymond Schwartz; Gaston Waringhien
- Release date: 1964 (France)
- Country: France
- Language: Esperanto

Angoroj (Agonies) is a 1964 film. It is the first feature film to be produced entirely in Esperanto. It was directed and produced by Jacques-Louis Mahé, a friend of Raymond Schwartz who, under the pseudonym 'Lorjak', had previously produced a silent Esperanto publicity film before World War II titled Antaŭen! (Onwards!).

== Overview ==
At the start of the 1960s, Mahé, a professional photographic and cinematic expert, invested in the production of the first fictional film in Esperanto. Using a scenario by Mahé himself, the actors of the Internacia Arta Teatro (International Arts Theatre) presented a crime story, set in the Parisian periphery of petty thieves and cheats. Other notable people who played parts in the film included Schwartz (the commissioner), Gaston Waringhien (the voice-over) and many from the environs of the contemporary Paris, including Michel Duc-Goninaz.

== Production ==
The film was produced from 1963 to 1964, but the market did not react favourably. Mahé, who lost a large sum of money, accused Universala Esperanto-Asocio of a boycott. At the highest point of his depression, he destroyed almost all copies: only two remain (acquired eventually by the Château de Grésillon and the British Esperanto Association, both already used) as well as the original, which LF-koop (Kooperativo de Literatura Foiro) rescued in 1991, distributing a 61-minute videotape.

== See also ==
- Incubus
- List of Esperanto-language films
