= Internacia Televido =

Short-lived 24/7 television station in Esperanto

Internacia Televido (International Television) was an internet-based Esperanto-language television station, launched on 5 November 2005 by the Ĝangalo news site from São Paulo, Brazil. A 24-hour streaming service funded primarily by viewer donations, the station ceased operation in August 2006.

== History ==
The channel was a goal from a fund-raising campaign by Flávio Rebelo, the owner of Ĝangalo, which included lectures in Europe and was funded by an Asian patron. In April 2004, the basic version of the plan was announced as service streamed over the internet, that would broadcast a four-hour block in order to reach out to a wide international audience. At first Rebelo wanted to finance with local banks, but the offers were rejected. He then turned to an audience of interested viewers that wanted to take part in the project. The €35,000 plan was going to involve advertising and cable television agreements.

Before its birth, it was revealed that the concept of an Esperanto-language television channel was "shrinking before its birth". ITV had failed to achieve its goals, having only received €19,910 out of the €35,000 Ĝangalo wanted to collect to sustain the service. A "cut" version of ITV was planned to go on air in August 2005, with limited programming.

ITV in its first weeks seen with a mixture of "enthusiasm and criticism". As a result of the lack of money in the fundraising campaign, ITV launched with a limited program offering. One of the scheduled programs, Teleĵurnalo, the first Esperanto newscast, wasn't in the initial schedule. It and the children's program Infanurbo (Kids City) would have only been possible if ITV had reached its initial goal. The limited schedule included "old" content made in advance for the service. On two randomly chosen days at the end of November, ITV carried a 1980s Polish documentary film about Esperanto, the Esperanto course "Esperanto, "Pasporto al la tuta mondo" ("Passport to the World"), produced by ELNA, a Brazilian documentary video with Esperanto translation and, in addition, silent "Amuzajn videojn" (Funny Videos). The limited schedule consisted of three half-hour programs, which were repeated one after the other, a total of 18 times a day. Throughout the week, part of the programs were repeated, because in total there were only five half-hour program items, continuously repeated for at least one week. The web stream also reported difficulties from users.

Both the ITV and Ĝangalo websites suffered from malfunction in January 2006, the cause being frequent storms in São Paulo at the time, which damaged its servers. On January 15, ITV announced that its website was working properly, but was receiving frequent error messages, not formally restarting until January 28.
