= Incubus (1966 film) =

American horror film

- Promotional re-release poster in 1996
- Directed by: Leslie Stevens
- Written by: Leslie Stevens
- Produced by: Anthony M. Taylor
- Starring: William Shatner; Milos Milos; Allyson Ames; Ann Atmar; Eloise Hardt; Robert Fortier
- Narrated by: Paolo Cossa
- Cinematography: Conrad Hall; William A. Fraker (uncredited)
- Edited by: Richard K. Brockway
- Music by: Dominic Frontiere
- Distributed by: Contempo III Productions
- Release date: October 26, 1966 (SFIFF)
- Running time: 78 minutes
- Country: United States
- Language: Esperanto
- Budget: $125,000 (est.)

Incubus (Esperanto: Inkubo) is a 1966 American horror film directed by Leslie Stevens. It was filmed entirely in the constructed language Esperanto, shortly before its star, William Shatner, began his work on Star Trek. The film's cinematography was by Conrad Hall, who went on to win three Academy Awards for his work on the films Butch Cassidy and the Sundance Kid, American Beauty, and Road to Perdition.

Incubus was the second feature film to use Esperanto, following the 1964 film Angoroj. The use of Esperanto was intended to create an eerie, otherworldly feeling, and Stevens prohibited dubbing the film into other languages; however, on the Special Features section of the DVD the makers claim that Esperanto was used because of perceived greater international sales. Esperanto speakers are generally disappointed by the pronunciation of the language by the cast of Incubus. The film was considered to be lost for many years, until a copy with French subtitles was found at Cinémathèque Française in 1996.

== Plot ==
The film is set in the village of Nomen Tuum (Latin, "your name"), which has a well that can heal the sick and make a person more beautiful. Because of the latter, many conceited or corrupt individuals come to the village for this cosmetic effect. The village has notoriety for its magical water, as well as being a ground for darkness and demons. Along the village, succubi entice the tainted souls who come to Nomen Tuum and lead them to their deaths in order to offer their souls to Hell/the God of Darkness. A prominent young succubus named Kia loathes the routine of herding sinners to hell. Kia claims her powers are being wasted, and needs something/someone more stimulating as her prey. Her sister succubus, Amael, warns Kia of the danger that a pure soul will bring: love. Kia persists anyway and attempts to find a clergyman to seduce into darkness. After watching their behaviour, however, she realizes these men are just as iniquitous and shrewd as her previous victims.

She soon stumbles upon a suitable victim: Marc, a young soldier, who with his sister Arndis. comes to the sacred water in order to heal his battle wounds. Kia then continues to follow the siblings and pretends to be lost. After a brief eclipse, Kia convinces Marc to accompany her to the sea. During the eclipse, Arndis becomes blind from looking into the sky. Disoriented, she stumbles around in order to find Marc. Marc and Kia quickly become attracted to each other.

Marc will not have closer relations with Kia unless they marry. As Kia sleeps, Marc takes her to the village cathedral. Kia flees from the cathedral, bewildered by the sight of Christ and the saints. She is repulsed by both the Godly images and Marc's pure love. His purity makes her ill.

Amael and Kia meditate revenge on Marc for "defiling her" with an "act of love". Amael summons an incubus that attempts to kill Marc and rapes and murders Arndis. As Marc prays for his sister, he makes the sign of the cross and the lurking demons cringe in horror. Defending himself from the incubus' attack, he appears to have killed him and Amael tells him he has the sin of murder on his hands. Kia follows Marc, who is dying, to the cathedral where she professes her love for him. The resurrected incubus intervenes and claims she belongs to the God of Darkness. Kia defies him and makes the sign of the cross, surprising even herself. The incubus transforms into a goat and wrestles her to the ground.

After the struggle, she says "I belong to the God of Light," and crawls toward Marc, who immediately embraces her. The final scene shows the couple staring in disbelief at the boundary of the cathedral, with the goat gazing back at them.

== Cast ==
- William Shatner as Marc
- Allyson Ames as Kia (succubus)
- Eloise Hardt as Amael (succubus)
- Robert Fortier as Olin
- Ann Atmar as Arndis
- Milos Milos as incubus
- Jay Ashworth as monk (Uncredited)
- Forrest T. Butler as monk (Uncredited)
- Paolo Cossa as narrator (voice) (Uncredited)
- Ted Mossman as monk (Uncredited)

== Production ==
=== Pre-production ===
After the ABC Television Network cancelled producer Leslie Stevens' science fiction series The Outer Limits in 1965, Stevens wrote a horror script to make use of the talents of the Outer Limits team he had brought together – including cinematographer Conrad L. Hall and composer Dominic Frontiere – with an eye to marketing it to art houses.

Stevens and producer Anthony M. Taylor wanted a device to make the film unique, and, to this end, chose Esperanto as the film's language. The script was translated into Esperanto, and the actors rehearsed for 10 days to learn their lines phonetically, but no one was present on the set to correct their pronunciation during shooting.

=== Filming ===
Principal photography took place over 18 days in May 1965. Location shooting took place at Big Sur Beach and at the Mission San Antonio de Padua near Fort Hunter Liggett in Monterey County. Concerned that the authorities would not grant permission to shoot a horror film in these places, especially the Mission, Stevens concocted a cover story that the film was actually called Religious Leaders of Old Monterey, and showed the script, in Esperanto, but with stage directions and descriptions about monks and farmers.

== Release ==
=== Theatrical release ===
The premiere of Incubus took place at the San Francisco Film Festival on October 26, 1966, where, according to producer Taylor, a group of 50 to 100 Esperanto enthusiasts "screamed and laughed" at the actors' poor pronunciation of the language. Partly because of its Esperanto dialogue, and partly because of the scandal of actor Milos Milos taking his own life and that of his girlfriend Carolyn Mitchell, Taylor and Stevens were unable to find any distribution for the film except in France, where it premiered in November 1966.

=== Restoration and home media ===
Incubus was considered a lost film for many years. When producer Anthony Taylor attempted to prepare Incubus for home video release in 1993, he was told by the company that stored the negative, film elements, and prints, that all were missing and presumed to have been destroyed in a fire.

In 1998, a print was discovered in the permanent collection of the Cinémathèque Française in Paris. However, not only was that print in poor condition, it had French subtitles. A new master was created by frame-by-frame optical printing, and English subtitles were superimposed over the French ones. The Sci Fi Channel funded the restoration from that print and a home video DVD was released in 2001.

On February 14, 2023, CineSavant stated that Le Chat Qui Fume reported that a new 35mm print with "excellent" image quality has been located. A Ultra HD Blu-ray sourced from a restored version of this print was released by Arrow Video on January 14, 2025.

== Reception ==
Stanley Eichelbaum of the San Francisco Examiner called the film "a dud, so pretentious and arty that it nearly drowns in dull, studied technique."

Dennis Schwartz of Ozus' World Movie Reviews awarded the film a grade C+, criticizing the film's "thin" story and Shatner's performance, but commended the film's atmosphere, cinematography, and ability to engage in spite of its flaws.

TV Guide rated the film one out of four stars, calling it "Inept, pretentious, and dull once the novelty wears off, but handsomely shot in Big Sur".

Bill Burke from HorrorNews.net praised the film's cinematography, surreal atmosphere, and uniqueness, calling it "a noble attempt at bargain basement surrealism".

== See also ==
- List of American films of 1966
- List of rediscovered films
