= The Universal Language (2011 film) =

- Directed by: Sam Green
- Starring: Arika Okrent; Renato Corsetti; Humphrey Tonkin
- Release dates: October 10, 2011 (Hot Springs Documentary Film Festival)
- Running time: 30 minutes
- Languages: English, Esperanto

The Universal Language (Esperanto: La Universala Lingvo) is a 2011 short documentary film on the Esperanto language and the movement around it. Using much archive footage from the language's early days, as well as interviews with Esperantists today, the film constructs a linear narrative of Esperanto's history and goals.

The film, directed by Sam Green, won the 2012 Ashland Independent Film Festival award for Juried Best Short Documentary.
