= Raymond Schwartz =

French banker and Esperanto author (1894–1973)

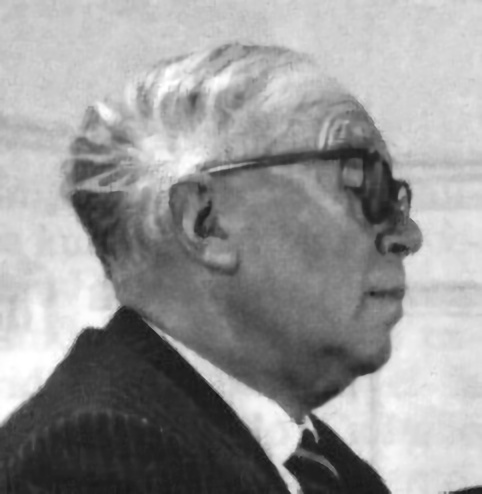
Raymond Schwartz

Raymond Schwartz (8 April 1894 – 14 May 1973) was a French banker and Esperanto author who wrote many poems and novels in Esperanto, as well as skits which he directed for Parisian Esperanto cabarets.

== Biography ==
Schwartz was born into a French-speaking family in Metz, a city in Alsace-Lorraine (German: Elsass-Lothringen) that from 1871 to 1918 was part of Germany. He received a good education in Metz and spoke not only French and German often but also Latin and Greek.

Very early he became an Esperantist and dreamt of a better future through the diffusion of Esperanto. World War I, when he was conscripted into the German army and had to fight on the Eastern Front, was a disaster for him as a pacifist and for the Esperanto movement in general. After the war he did not remain in Metz, now again a French city, but moved to Paris, where he worked in a large banking firm until his retirement.

== Esperanto writings ==
Between the wars he published in different periodicals, particularly in Literatura Mondo (Literary World), and wrote two volumes of poetry. His poetic works Verdkata testamento (The Will of the Green Cat) (1926) and Stranga butiko (The Strange Boutique) (1931) are imaginative and humorous fantasies involving word games, characteristics also found in Prozo ridetanta (1928) (Smiling Prose).

His short novel Anni kaj Montmartre (Annie and Montmartre, 1930) recounts the adventures of a young naîve German woman in Paris; it departs from the conventions of original Esperanto literature, in particular because of its style of writing.

From 1933 to 1935 he published the monthly satirical magazine La Pirato (The Pirate), which made him a sort of enfant terrible of the Esperanto movement, one for whom there were no secrets and for whom everything was an occasion for humour.

His masterwork, published after World War II, is Kiel akvo de l' rivero (Like the water of the river), considered as his most significant and most moving book. This is a partly autobiographical novel of a young Frenchman from the Franco-German frontier who comes to Berlin after graduation but must flee at the outbreak of war in 1914. During the occupation of France by Nazi Germany he joins the French Resistance. After the war he once more meets in Paris the woman he loved as a young man in Berlin. This classic novel about a family torn apart by two world wars is both serious and amusing.

He collaborated on Sennacieca Revuo, an annual cultural review published by Sennacieca Asocio Tutmonda (World Non-National Association), writing a column titled Laŭ mia ridpunkto, literally "According to my laughpoint", the last word being formed by analogy with the established compound vidpunkto "viewpoint". The column itself was written in a humorous style that included kalemburoj (puns) and antistrofoj (spoonerisms).

== Cabaret ==
Serious and competent in his profession, he showed an altogether different face in the Esperanto cabarets, where he created many skits, creating for Esperantists the character of a merry drunkard. Since 1881 there had been in Paris a famous cabaret known as Le Chat Noir ("The Black Cat"). At Montmartre, on the outskirts of Paris, he founded in December 1920 an Esperanto cabaret called La Verda Kato ("The Green Cat"), which he directed from 1920 to 1926, as well as La Bolanta Kaldrono ("The Boiling Cauldron"), which ran from 1936 to 1939. In 1949 he was joint founder of Tri Koboldoj ("Three Imps"), which continued in existence until 1956. His skits and books were amusing, spiritual and sometime risqué. "If people cannot laugh at themselves, they have not grown up" was a favourite saying of his.

== Bibliography ==
=== Literary works ===
- Verdkata testamento (1926 poetry collection, reprinted 1930, 1974, 1992) With afterword by Reinhard Haupenthal, Iltis-Eld., Saarbrücken: 1992, 121 pp. ISBN 978-3-927613-20-1
- Prozo ridetanta (1928 prose works) Esperantista Centra Librejo, Paris, 1928. 126 pp.
- Anni kaj Montmartre (1930 novel, illustrated by Raymond Laval, reprinted 1974) Solsona, Paris: 1930; 1974 reprint by Dansk Esperanto-Forlag, Aabyhoj. ISBN 978-87-85020-75-8
- La stranga butiko (1931 poetry collection), illustrated by Raymond Laval, Solsona: Paris, 1930., 124 pp.
- La ĝoja podio (1949 poetry collection) Esperantista Centra Librejo, Paris. 271 pp.
- Kia honto (1950 original stories) Regensburg, 50 pp.
- Kiel akvo de l’ rivero (1963 novel, reprinted 1987, 1991) Edistudio, Pisa. 487 pp. ISBN 978-88-7036-048-6
- "La ĝendarmo deĵoras" and "Bapto de l’ sonorilo en Mulmont" in 33 rakontoj (an Esperanto anthology), Régulo, La Laguna: 1964, 328 pp. (Vol. XVII in Bel-literatura eldon-serio.)
- Kun siaspeca spico (1971 humorous essay anthology) Includes all the "Laŭ mia ridpunkto" columns, 215 pp.
- Vole... Novele: aŭ kvindek jaroj da noveloj, 1920 - 1970 (1971 novellas, reprinted 1987) TK: Copenhagen, 1971, 192 pp. ISBN 978-87-87089-01-2; reprinted 1987 by Iltis-Eld., Saarbrücken
- "Bapto de l’ sonorilo en Mulmont" (from La ĝoja podio), "La pipo de Prosper" and "La ĝendarmo deĵoras" in Trezoro: la Esperanta novelarto 1887-1986, Reto Rossetti and Henri Vatré, eds., Hungara Esperanto-Asocio, Budapest: 1989. ISBN 978-963-571-105-5
- "La ĝendarmo deĵoras" in Vivo kaj morto de Wiederboren Sezonoj:Jekaterinburg, 1998, 80 pp.

=== Articles ===
- Ne kiel Meier: Invito al revizio de niaj konceptoj pri la konjugacio en Esperanto, Unuiĝo Franca por Esperanto, Paris, 1930, 47 pp., reprinted 1964.
- Foreword by Raymond Schwartz in Cezaro Rossetti's Kredu min, sinjorino, Heroldo de Esperanto, Scheveningen, 1950, 260 pp., reprinted 1974, 1990
- "Sen mistiko kontraŭ mistifiko" in La Zamenhofa Esperanto, Hendrik A. de Hoog, ed., Régulo: La Laguna (1961), 329 pp.
- "Kompleta inventaro de la pasivaj participoj -ata kaj -ita kunligitaj kun la formo de la verbo esti en la verko La rabistoj." Paris: 1968, 10 pp., reprinted 1995
- "Lirica e praticità; Liriko kaj praktiko; Le diverse età dell' uomo; La diversaj aĝoj de l' homo" in El la nova ĝardeno (Dal nuovo giardino), Dante Bertolini, ed., Pedrazzini: Locarno, 1979, 100 pp.
- "Esperantisto, ekesto kaj malapero" and "Esperanta eliksiro" in Nova Esperanta krestomatio, William Auld, ed., Universala Esperanto-Asocio: Rotterdam: 1991, 509 pp., ISBN 978-92-9017-043-3. Series title: Jubilea kolekto Jarcento de Esperanto

=== Musical lyrics ===
- Paris toujours Paris (Parizo ĉiam Parizo). French lyrics by L. Bergen le Play, tr. into Esperanto by Raymond Schwartz; music composed by J. M. Hamonic. Omnium, Paris: 1930.
- Ĉiu ĉiu. French lyrics by André Hornez, tr. into Esperanto by Raymond Schwartz; music composed by Nicanor Molinare. Ed. Musicales Imperia, Paris, 1948.
- Koro estas eta instrument sekreta. Esperanto lyrics by Raymond Schwartz, tr. into Polish and arranged by Zbigniew Sochacki. Music composed by Oktawian Kalmanowicz. Pola Esperanto Asocio, Lublin, 1960.

=== Literary appreciation and criticism ===
- Marie-Thérèse Lloancy, Esperanto et jeu de mots dans l’oeuvre de Raymond Schwartz, thesis dissertation for Université René Descartes, Paris, 1985
- Marie-Thérèse Lloancy, "Les jeux de mots de Raymond Schwartz dans trois ouvrages en Espéranto publiés par Stafeto - La Zamenhofa Esperanto, Kiel akvo de l’ rivero et Kun siaspeca spico" in Serta gratulatoria in honorem Juan Régulo. Universidad de La Laguna, Salamanca, 3,266 pp., 1986 ISBN 978-84-600-4290-7
- Jean Thierry, "Raymond Schwartz (1894-1973) la vortĵonglisto" in La stato kaj estonteco de la internacia lingvo Esperanto (Proceedings of the first symposium of the Esperanto Academy (Prague, 1994). Petr Chrdle, ed., LinkKava-Pech: Prague, 1995, 190 pp. ISBN 978-80-85853-08-7
- Paul P. Gubbins, "Majstra muzikado: Berlino en romanoj de Varankin kaj Schwartz" in Lingva arto. Vilmos Benczik, ed., Universala Esperanto-Asocio, Rotterdam: 1999, 217 pp. ISBN 978-92-9017-064-8

=== Biographical works ===
- Roger Bernard, Raymond Schwartz: lia vivo kaj verkaro. Kultura Centro Esperantista, La Chaux-de-Fonds: 1977.
