= Kazimierz Bein =

Polish ophthalmologist (1872–1959)

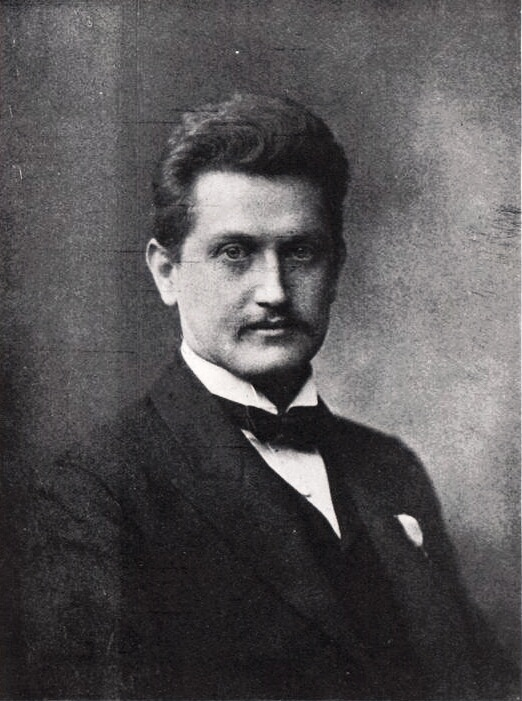
- Born: 1872
- Died: 15 June 1959 (aged 86–87)
- Occupation: Ophthalmologist
- Writing career
- Pen name: Kabe
- Genre: Esperanto

Kazimierz Bein (1872 – 15 June 1959), often referred to by his pseudonym Kabe, was a Polish ophthalmologist, the founder and sometime director of the Warsaw Ophthalmic Institute (Warszawski Instytut Oftalmiczny).

He was also, for a time, a prominent Esperanto author, translator and activist, until in 1911 he suddenly, without explanation, abandoned the Esperanto movement. Bein became at least as well known for his involvement with Esperanto as for his medical accomplishments, and as much for the manner in which he left the Esperanto movement as for what he had accomplished within it.

== Life ==
As a young man, Bein participated in the Polish movement for independence from Russia, for which he was exiled for several years; thus he was forced to finish his medical training in Kazan. Bein authored many technical books and articles, and founded the Warsaw Ophthalmic Institute and the Polish Ophthalmological Society. He was also a noted amateur photographer.

== Esperanto movement ==
Bein was among the earliest adopters of Esperanto, the international language that had been created by a fellow Polish ophthalmologist, L. L. Zamenhof. Bein became an eminent pioneer of Esperanto prose, writing under the pseudonym, "Kabe," an abbreviation of his actual name (and also the Polish pronunciation of his initials, "K.B."). In 1904 he gained fame with his translation of a 1900 novel by Wacław Sieroszewski, Dno nędzy (The Depths of Misery; Esperanto title: Fundo de l' Mizero).

In 1906 Bein became vice-president of the Academy of Esperanto. He had a profound influence on the language's early development. The highlights of his career were most likely his Esperanto translation of Bolesław Prus's historical novel, Faraono (Pharaoh), and one of the first Esperanto dictionaries, Vortaro de Esperanto.

Bein is, however, probably best known for his sudden, comment-less 1911 disappearance from the Esperanto scene. Interviewed twenty years later, in 1931, by the Esperanto magazine, Literatura Mondo (World of Literature), he spoke of Esperanto's stalled progress, and said that he no longer regarded the language as a viable solution to the need for an international language.

Shortly after he left the movement, Esperantists coined the word kabei, after "Kabe," meaning "to fervently and successfully participate in Esperanto, then suddenly and silently drop out." The expression, kabei, remains in use by Esperantists to this day.

== See also ==
- Constructed languages
