= Sam Green =

American documentary filmmaker

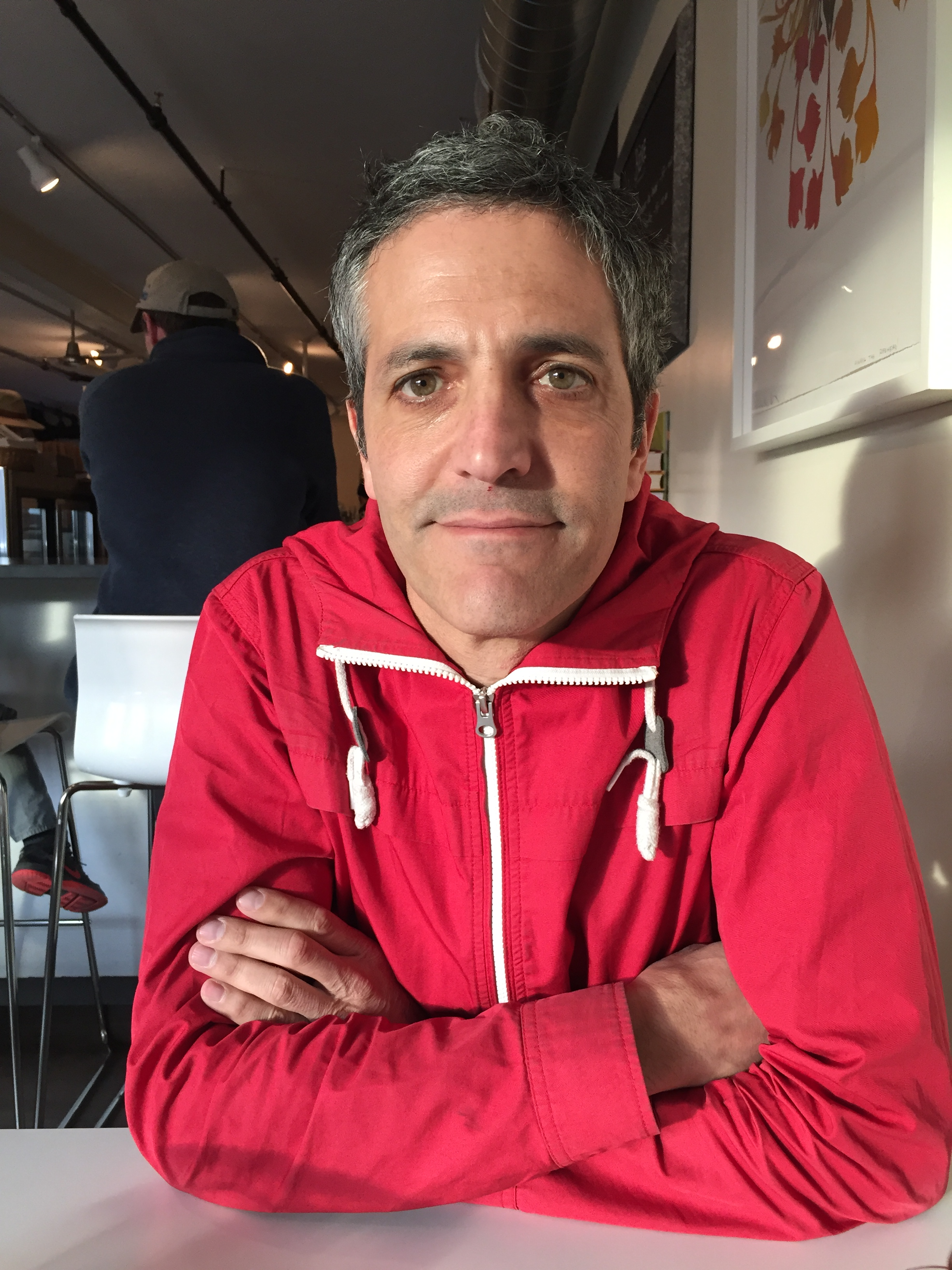
Sam Green in 2016

Sam Green is an American documentary filmmaker. His most recent projects are “live documentaries” in which he narrates a film in-person while musicians perform a live soundtrack. His 2018 project A Thousand Thoughts features a live score by the Kronos Quartet, and his 2012 project The Love Song of R. Buckminster Fuller featured a live score by the band Yo La Tengo. Green's 2004 film The Weather Underground was nominated for an Academy Award, included in the Whitney Biennial, and broadcast nationally on PBS.

== Early life ==
Green was raised in East Lansing, Michigan, and is a graduate of East Lansing High School. He earned his undergraduate degree from the University of Michigan, Ann Arbor. He received his master's degree in journalism from the University of California, Berkeley, where he studied documentary with filmmaker Marlon Riggs.

== Career ==
One of Green's earliest films, The Rainbow Man/John 3:16, focuses on the life of Rollen Stewart, who became famous during the 1970s by appearing at thousands of televised sporting events wearing a rainbow-colored wig. The film premiered at the 1997 Sundance Film Festival, where director of programming Trevor Groth described it as "a parable about alienation, the media, and the meaninglessness that often defines American life." Green received the Creative Capital Moving Image Award in 2001.

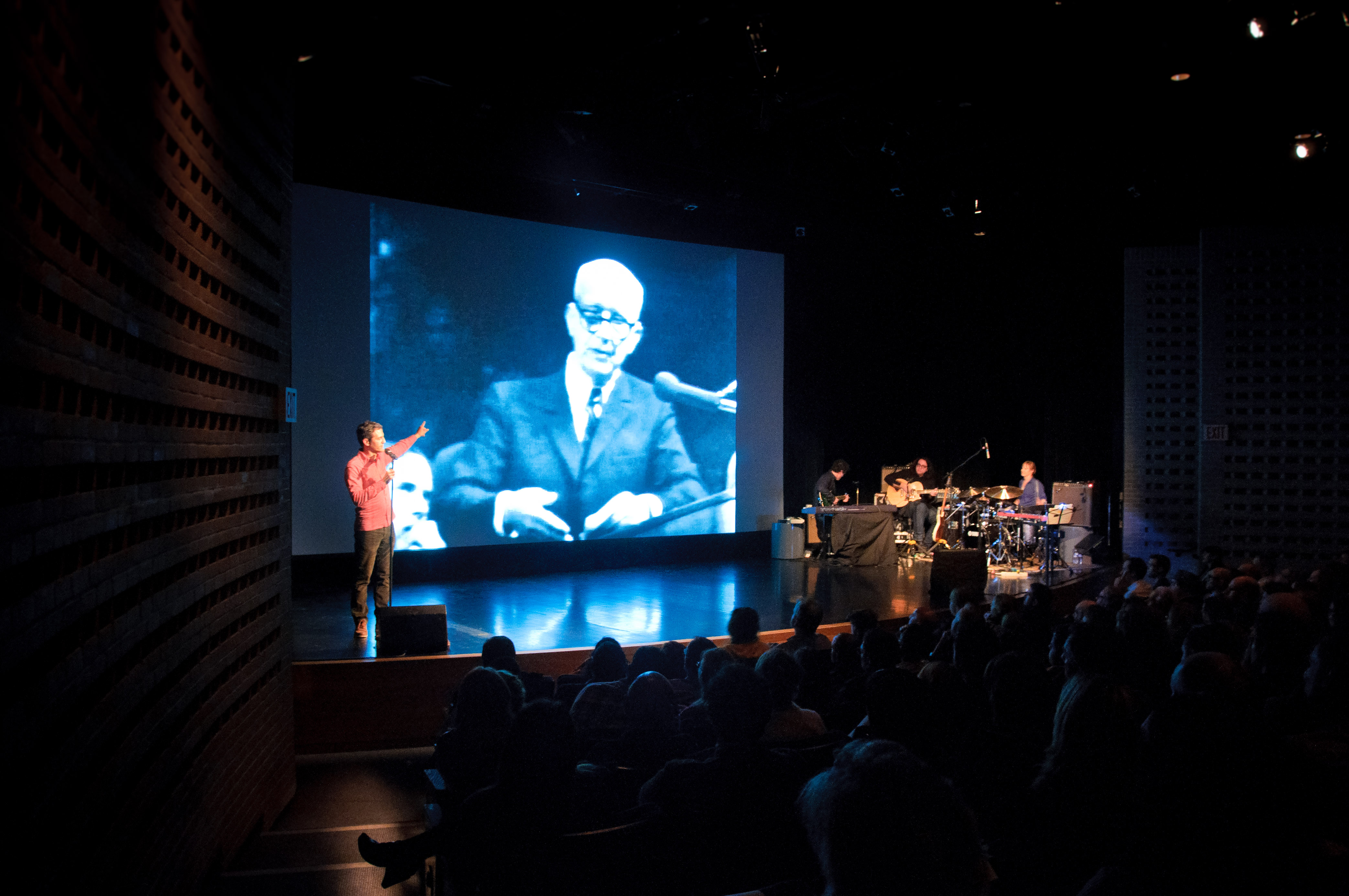
Sam Green and Yo La Tengo performing "The Love Song of R. Buckminster Fuller" at SFMOMA, May 2, 2012

Green's feature-length documentary film The Weather Underground focused on the group of violent extremists of the same name, who during the late 1960s and '70s attempted to violently overthrow the United States government. The film premiered at the 2003 Sundance Film Festival and was nominated for a 2003 Academy Award for Documentary Feature category. The award winning film interweaves extensive archival material with modern-day interviews to explore the story of the Weather Underground. The New York Times film critic Elvis Mitchell called the documentary a "terrifically smart and solid piece of film-making."

Sam Green's documentary Utopia in Four Movements (2010) also premiered at the Sundance Film Festival, in the category entitled "New Frontiers." In this "live" documentary, Green narrates the 75-minute film while a live band performs the score; the film examines various topics, including an American exile in Cuba, the world's largest shopping mall (located in China), the treatment of mass graves, and the history of the man-made language Esperanto.

Green’s 2012 live documentary, The Love Song of R. Buckminster Fuller, is a portrait of the theorist and designer Buckminster Fuller and features a live score by the band Yo La Tengo. The piece combines in-person narration and live music alongside projected film clips and photographs. It was commissioned by the San Francisco Museum of Modern Art and premiered at the San Francisco Film Festival in May 2012.

Green’s 2014 live documentary, entitled The Measure of All Things, is based very loosely on the Guinness Book of World Records. The piece premiered at the 2014 Sundance Film Festival and is screened with live scores by the chamber group yMusic and a trio made up of Brendan Canty (Fugazi), T. Griffin, and Catherine McRae.

Green's 2018 live documentary, A Thousand Thoughts, chronicles the multi-decade career of the Kronos Quartet. The piece premiered at the 2018 Sundance Film Festival and won the San Francisco Film Festival audience award. The piece is screened with a live score performed by the Kronos Quartet.

32 Sounds, Green's most recent live documentary, is a collaboration with electronic musician JD Samson. The film, which premiered at the 2022 Sundance Film Festival and played at SXSW 2022, is described as a "meditation on the power of sound to bend time, cross borders, and profoundly shape our perception of the world around us". In a review for Rolling Stone, David Fear called 32 Sounds, 'the greatest documentary you've ever heard.' Writing for IndieWire, Eric Kohn says of 32 Sounds, 'the project’s long-term viability provides a valuable case study for how unconventional, smaller-scale non-fiction filmmaking can remain sustainable. Staying small and strange is a way to stay safe.'

== Filmography ==
- The Oldest Person in the World (2026)
- 32 Sounds with JD Samson (2022)
- Annea Lockwood/a Film About Listening (2021)
- 7 Sounds with JD Samson (2021)
- Don’t Call Me Gay Zelig with live music by JD Samson (2019)
- A Thousand Thoughts with the Kronos Quartet (2018)
- Julius Caesar was Buried in a Pet Cemetery (2018)
- This is What the Future Looked Like, co-directed with Gary Hustwit (2017)
- Brent Green/Sam Green: Live Cinema (2016)
- The Measure of All Things, with the chamber music group yMusic and a trio made up of Brendan Canty (Fugazi), T. Griffin, and Catherine McRae (2014)
- A Cinematic Study of Fog in San Francisco, co-directed with Andy Black (2013)
- Love Letter to the Fog (2013)
- The Love Song of R. Buckminster Fuller, with the band Yo La Tengo (2012)
- The Universal Language (2011)
- (Commissioned) Portrait of Las Vegas (2011)
- Utopia in Four Movements, co-directed with Dave Cerf (2010)
- Utopia, Part 3: The World's Largest Shopping Mall, co-directed with Carrie Lozano (2009)
- Clear Glasses (2008)
- Lot 63, Grave C (2006)
- N-Judah 5:30 (2004)
- The Weather Underground (2003)
- Pie Fight '69, co-directed with Christian Bruno (2000)
- The Fabulous Stains: Behind the Movie, co-directed with Sarah Jacobson (1999)
- The Rainbow Man/John 3:16 (1997)
