= Plena Ilustrita Vortaro de Esperanto =

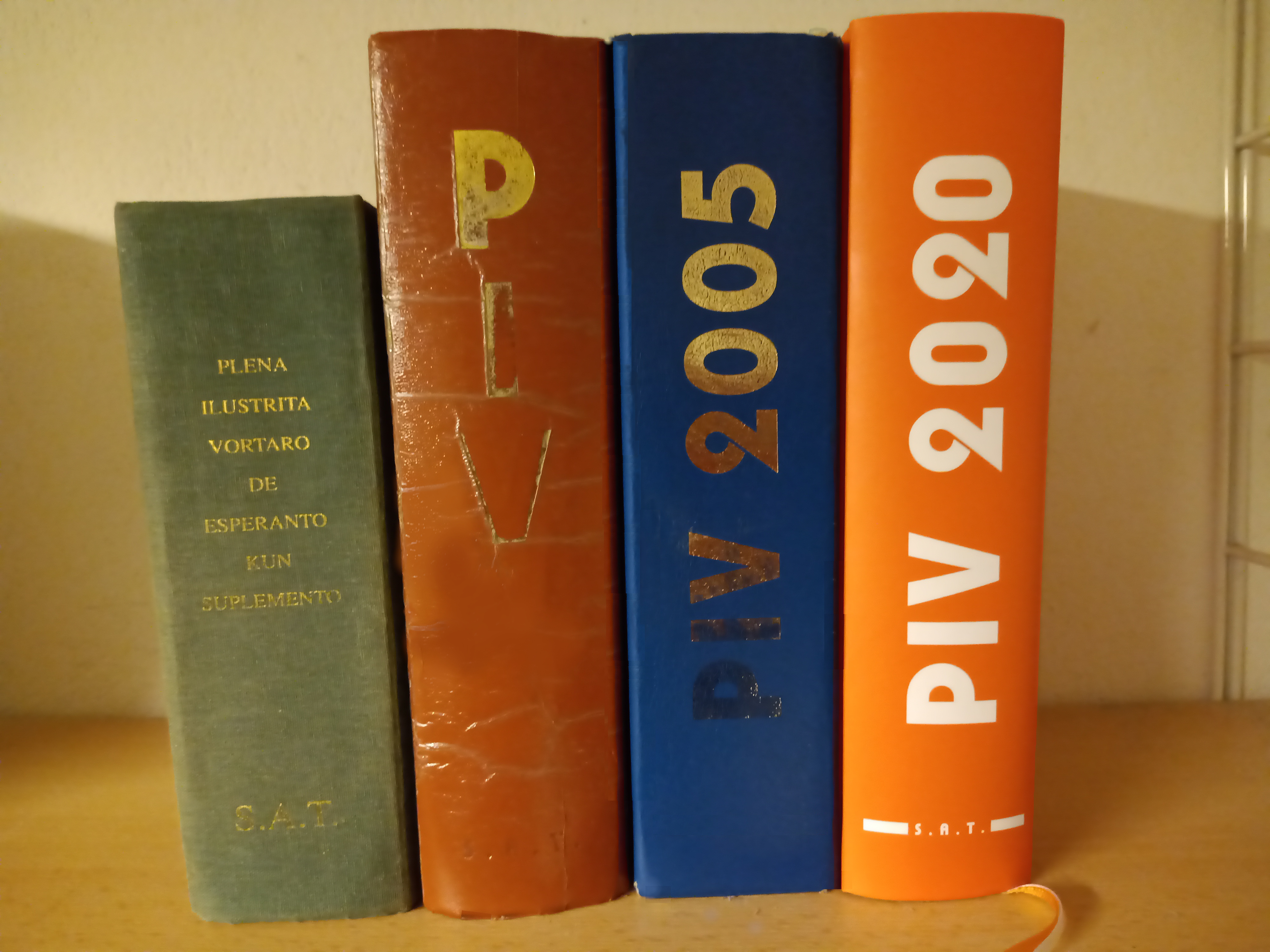
PIV 1987, PIV 2002, PIV 2005 and PIV 2020

Plena Ilustrita Vortaro de Esperanto (PIV; Complete Illustrated Dictionary of Esperanto) is a monolingual dictionary of the language Esperanto. It was first compiled in 1970 by a large team of Esperanto linguists and specialists under the guidance of Gaston Waringhien and is published by the Sennacieca Asocio Tutmonda (SAT). It may be consulted online for free.

The term "illustrated" refers to two features: 1 - The use of clipart-like symbols rather than abbreviations for certain purposes (eg, entries pertaining to agriculture are marked with a small image of a sickle rather than a note like "Agri." for "Agrikulturo".) 2 - The occasional use of a line-art sketch illustrating the item being defined. These sketches are not used for most entries. The entries that do have a sketch are most commonly plants and animals, and sometimes tools.

== History ==
=== First Esperanto dictionary ===
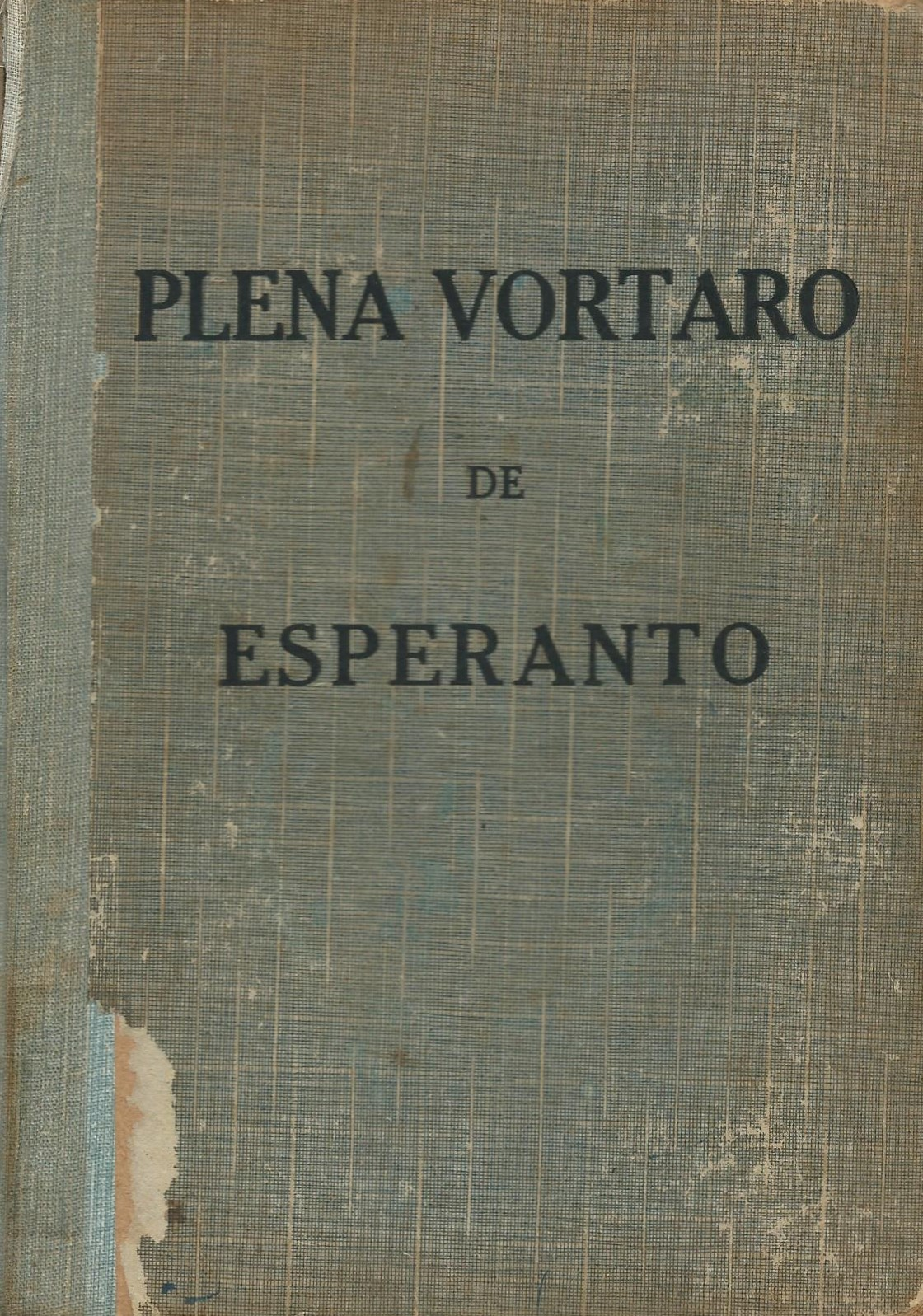
Cover of the Plena Vortaro de Esperanto

The first complete Esperanto dictionary, Plena Vortaro de Esperanto (PV), was published in 1930 and was modeled after the French dictionary Le Petit Larousse Illustré. The second edition of PV was published in 1934 and became the dictionary of choice for Esperanto as it contained 6,900 lemmas and 5,000 compounds.

=== Original publication ===
First published in 1970, the PIV has undergone two revisions to date and is considered by many to be something of a standard for Esperanto, thanks mainly to its unchallenged scope—15,200 words and 39,400 lexical units. However, it is also criticized as excessively influenced by the French language and politically biased. Moreover, its few and often outmoded illustrations appeared only as an appendix.

=== Supplement of 1987 ===
In 1987, a supplement was separately published, produced under the guidance of Gaston Waringhien and Roland Levreaud. It covered approximately 1000 words and 1300 lexical units.

=== 2002 and 2005 editions ===
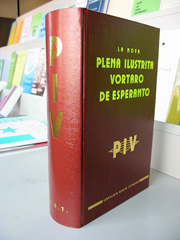
2004 edition of Plena Ilustrita Vortaro

In 2002, after many years of work, a new revised edition appeared with the title La Nova Plena Ilustrita Vortaro de Esperanto (The New PIV), also dubbed PIV2 or PIV2002. Its chief editor was Michel Duc-Goninaz. PIV2002 (much like PIV2005) includes 16,780 words and 46,890 lexical units. Its illustrations are no longer located on the last pages, but rather are incorporated into the text itself.

The edition was first presented to the SAT congress in Alicante, Spain in July 2002. The stock of 2000 printed books ran out in 2004, and a new edition, La Plena Ilustrita Vortaro Eldono 2005 ISBN 2-9502432-8-2 with corrected typos and detailed modifications, appeared in March 2005.

Bertilo Wennergren—a member of the Akademio de Esperanto, a group which attempts to define standards of good Esperanto usage—has compiled a 25,000-word critique of the 2002 and 2005 editions. (Misprints and erroneous usages from the 2002 edition that were corrected in the subsequent edition have been retained for archival reasons but are shown on his web page as struck out.) One may note, for example, that the PIV still contains a Gallicism or two; Wennergren mentions that the PIV headword tamul/o is defined as one who belongs to an ethnic group in "Tamulio" (Tamil Nadu) and Sri Lanka, where words like tamilo and Tamilio, respectively, might have been preferable. He suggests that the "i" vowel in the second syllable is more internationally recognizable than "u", suggesting that the form tamulo is supported only in the French word tamoul, but the PIV does not include a headword tamil/o or even list it as a synonym.

=== 2020 edition ===
The last traditionally printed edition of the book was published in the year 2020, the 50th anniversary of the PIV. After that it is planned to permanently update the website of the project and to offer a Print on demand edition of the book based on the latest version of the website.

=== PIV online ===
In August 2010, it was announced that SAT reached an agreement with the educational organization E@I to convert the PIV into an online searchable version. The SAT, which previously put off a PIV electronic edition out of fear of undercutting the market for the paper version, is donating the rights to use the PIV text free of charge. However, E@I estimated that the conversion process will cost a minimum of 10,000 euros, which would need to be contributed by Esperanto organizations and individual Esperantists.

Although at the beginning of 2011, the fundraising efforts had yet to reach the halfway point, several large donations pushed the vortaro.net fund to 13,540 euros by April 14, 2011 and E@I reported work on the online PIV was underway. On April 4, 2012, a beta version of the online PIV system was made available to the public for testing.

== See also ==
- Vortaro de Esperanto
