= Gaston Waringhien =

French linguist, lexicographer, and Esperantist

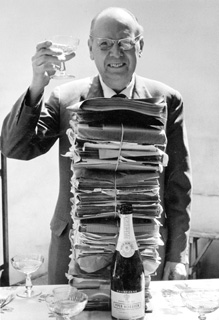
- Born: July 20, 1901; Lille
- Died: December 20, 1991 (aged 90); Paris
- Citizenship: French
- Occupations: Linguist, writer, Esperantist, and lexicographer

Gaston Waringhien (July 20, 1901 – December 20, 1991) was a French linguist, lexicographer, and Esperantist. He wrote poems as well as essays and books on linguistics. He was chairman of the Akademio de Esperanto.

== Books ==
- Plena Vortaro (1930)
- Plena Ilustrita Vortaro (1970)

== Other works ==
- Parnasa gvidlibro (with Kálmán Kalocsay, 1932)
- Kontribuo al poemkolekto Dekdu Poetoj, 1934
- Plena (analiza) gramatiko (with Kálmán Kalocsay, 1935, 1938, 1981)
- Facilaj esperantaj legajhoj (redaction, 1935)
- Maximes de La Rochefoucauld (translation, 1935)
- Leteroj de L.L.Zamenhof (redaction, 1948)
- Poemoj de Omar Kajam (translation, 1953)
- Eseoj I: Beletro (1956)
- La floroj de l' malbono ("Les fleurs du mal" (The flowers of evil) by Charles Baudelaire, translator and redactor, 1957)
- Kantoj kaj romancoj (translation with Kálmán Kalocsay)
- La trofeoj (translation 1977)
- Tra la parko de la franca poezio: La renesanca periodo / La klasika periodo (translations, 1977/1980)
- La ĥimeroj (translations, 1976)
- Lingvo kaj vivo (essays, 1969)
- Ni kaj ĝi (essays, 1972)
- 1887 kaj la sekvo (essays, 1980)
- Kaj la ceter' - nur literaturo (essays, 1983)
- Duonvoĉe (original poems, 1939 and 1963)
