= Berzsenyi Dániel Gymnasium =

Dániel Berzsenyi Gymnasium
- Berzsenyi Dániel Gimnázium
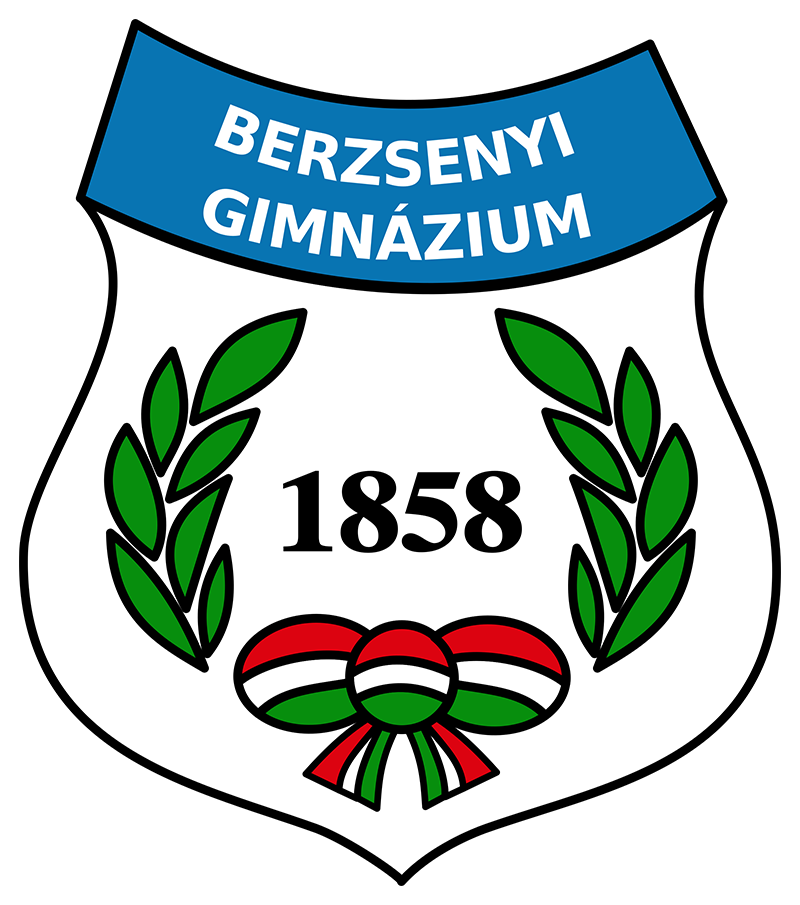

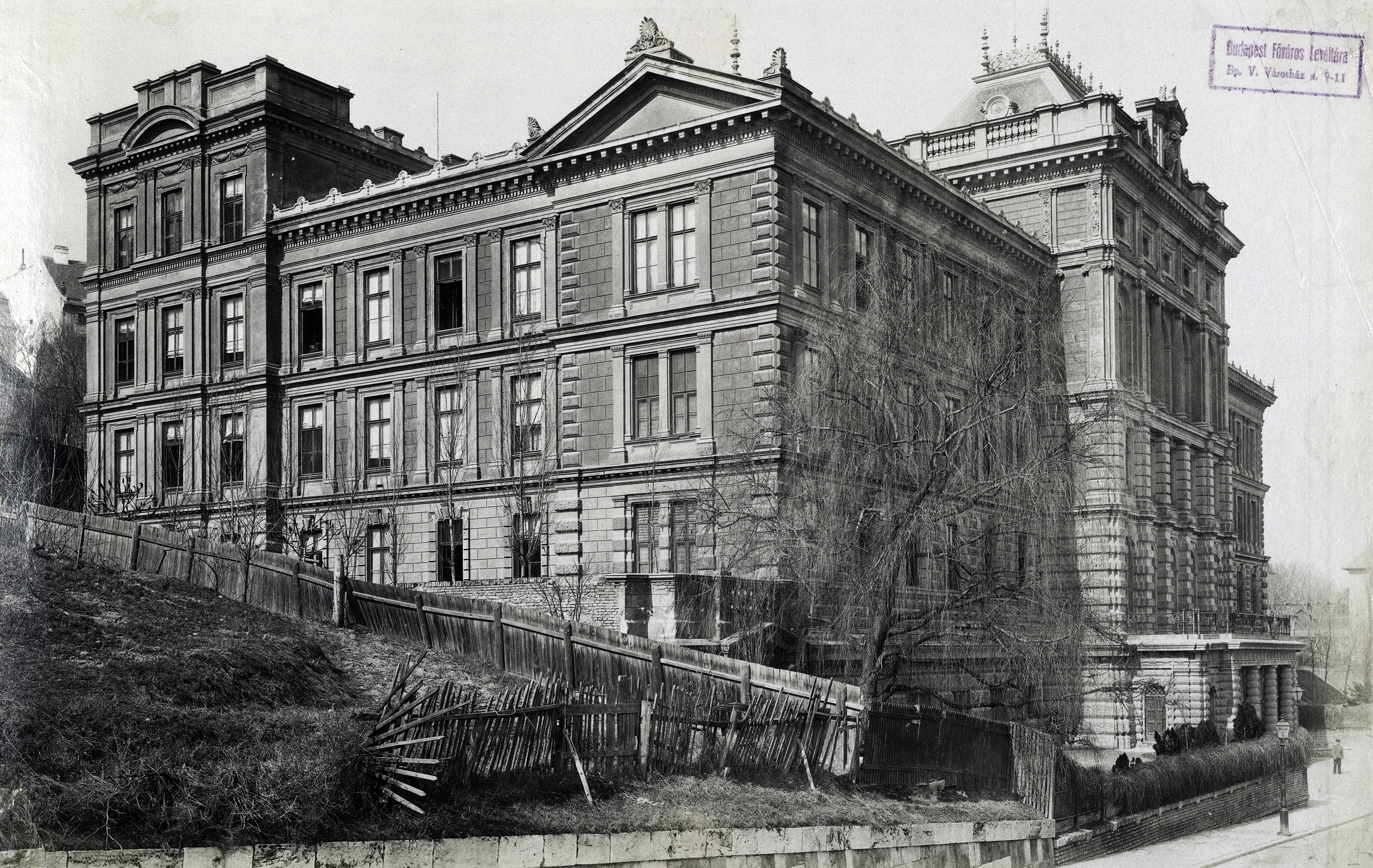
- The original building

Location
- 49-53 Kárpát Street, Budapest, Hungary; Budapest, Hungary 1133; 47.5269°N 19.0578°E

Information
- Former names: Pest Imperial and Royal Catholic High School ("Pesti császári és királyi Katolikus Főgimnázium"); Budapest-Terézvárosi Állami Főreáltanoda
- School type: Public secondary school
- Established: 1858
- Status: Operates
- School district: 13th district of Budapest
- Headmaster: Gyöngyi Kiss (since 2016)
- Teaching staff: 68
- Grades: Humanities; Natural science Formal science Modern languages
- Years offered: 4 or 6
- Age range: between 14 and 18
- Capacity: 550
- Classes: 18
- Average class size: 34
- Language: Hungarian
- National ranking: ▲14th (2025)
- Website: www.berzsenyi.hu/

Dániel Berzsenyi Gymnasium (Hungarian: Berzsenyi Dániel Gimnázium) is a secondary school in Vizafogó, Budapest, Hungary. Founded as the German-style "Kaiserlich-Königliches Gymnasium in Pesth" in 1858, the school was renamed in 1920 for Hungarian poet Dániel Berzsenyi (1776–1836). It moved to its present building in 1986, from a previous location in the downtown of the city.

Notable alumni include Mihály Károlyi, former prime minister and president of Hungary, poets Miklós Radnóti and Frigyes Karinthy, Hungarian-American businessman György Soros, and Olympic champion swimmer Alfréd Hajós.

== Notable alumni ==
- Donát Bánki, mechanical engineer
- Emanuel Beke, mathematician
- Gabor Carelli, classical tenor
- Gábor Darvas, composer and musicologist
- István Eörsi, writer, novelist and poet
- Dennis Gabor, Nobel Prize-winning physicist and mechanical engineer
- Marcel Grossmann, mathematician
- Alfréd Hajós, Olympic champion swimmer
- Jenő Heltai, poet
- Judit Hernádi, actress
- Victor Jacobi, operetta composer
- Frigyes Karinthy, author, playwright, poet and journalist
- Mihály Károlyi, politician, former prime minister and president of Hungary
- George Klein Hungarian–Swedish microbiologist
- Zsuzsa Koncz, singer
- André Kostolany, speculator
- Tom Lantos, American politician
- George Pólya, mathematician
- Miklós Radnóti, poet
- Gusztáv Rados, mathematician
- György Sárközi, poet
- George Soros, businessman, investor, and philanthropist
- Bence Szabolcsi, music historian
- Zsófia Szamosi, actress
- Tibor Szanyi, politician
- György Szepesi, radio personality, journalist and sports executive
- Gábor Tardos, mathematician
- Bence Tordai, politician
- Péter Zollman, scientist, engineer and inventor

== See also ==
- List of notable secondary schools in Hungary
