= Ada Karinthi =

Hungarian painter (1880–1955)

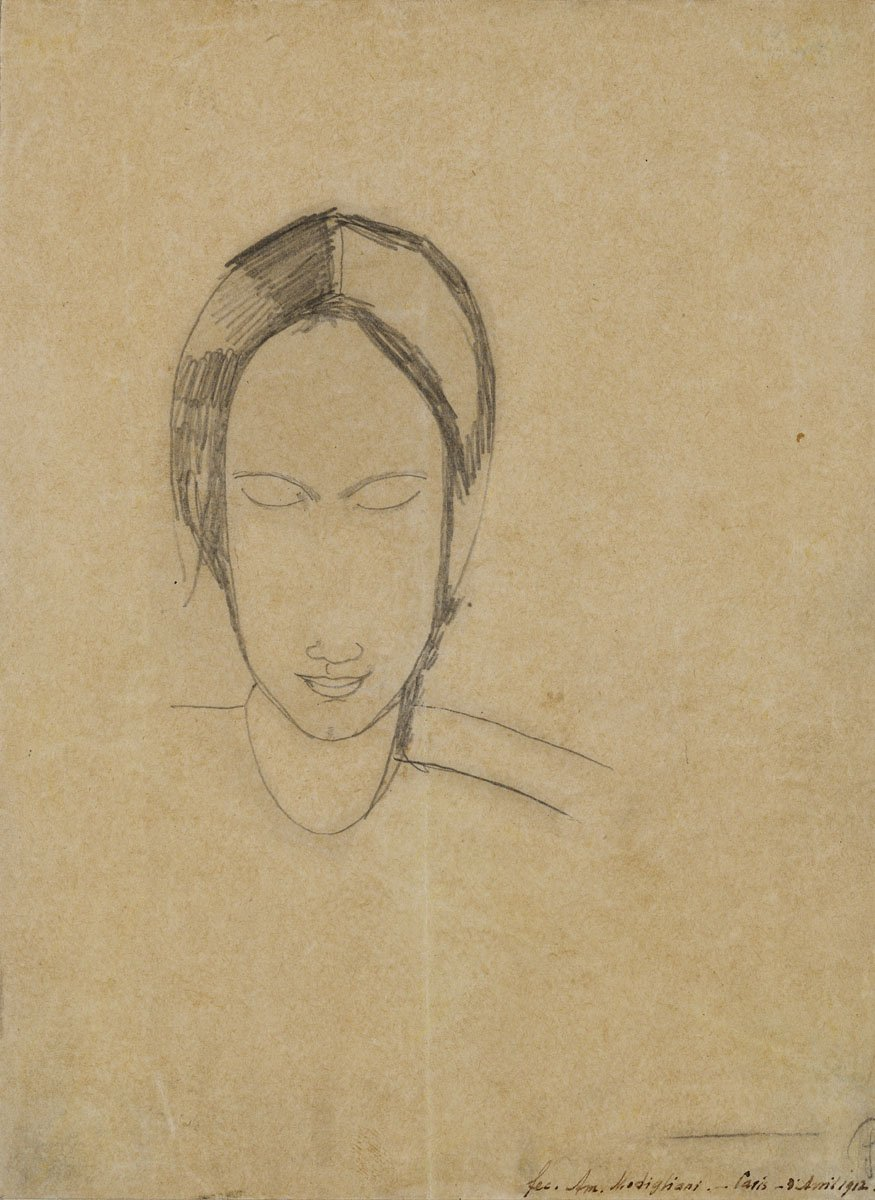
- 1912 drawing of Karinthi by Amedeo Modigliani
- Born: 20 October 1880; Budapest, Austria-Hungary
- Died: 31 May 1955 (aged 74); Budapest, Hungary
- Education: Nagybánya artists' colony
- Movement: Nagybánya artists' colony
- Spouse: Viktor Erdei
- Relatives: Frigyes Karinthy (brother)

Ada Noémi Karinthi, born Etelka Karinthi, later Adél Jusztina Karinthi, name variant: E. Ada Karinthy (20 October 1880, Budapest, – 31 May 1955, Budapest, Józsefváros) was a Hungarian painter and illustrator. She was the sister of writer Frigyes Karinthy and the wife of the painter Viktor Erdei.

== Life ==
Daughter of József Ernő Karinthi and Karolina Szeréna Engel, a bourgeois family in Budapest. Her family was originally Jewish, but converted to Lutheranism shortly before her brother Frigyes was born (1887). Young Etelka played piano and wrote poems in childhood, before studying at the free school in Nagybánya artists' colony between 1906 and 1912. She exhibited at the National Salon (1914, 1916, 1917) and at the 1916/17 winter exhibition of the Hall of Art, mainly watercolors. She also produced works of applied art and book illustrations. On 14 June 1908 Viktor Erdei married non-denominational Ada in Budapest. Their marriage was dissolved in 1922, but they married again on 21 June 1924 in Budapest. Her death was caused by myocardial degeneration and pneumonia.

== Bibliography ==
- Magyar zsidó lexikon. Ed. Peter Ujvári. Jewish Lexicon, 1929.
- "Karinthi Ada Noémi | PLM Namespace". PLM Namespace.
- Magyar asszonyok lexikona. Compiled, prefaced and provided by Margit Bozzay. 1931. Stephanum St.
- Gulyás Pál: Magyar írók élete és munkái. Hungarian Association of Librarians and Archivists, 1939–2002. From volume 7 to the press, reg. János Viczián.
- Karinthy E. Ada /Karinthy Ada Noémi, Erdei Viktorné/ (1880-1955) OMIKE
