= Kredu min, sinjorino! =

Esperanto novel by Cezaro Rossetti

Believe me, Madam!
- First edition
- Author: Cezaro Rossetti
- Original title: Kredu min, Sinjorino!
- Language: Esperanto
- Publisher: 1st Heroldo de Esperanto; 2nd SATEB; 3rd.; 4th. Edistudio
- Publication date: 1950, 1974, 1990, 2012
- Publication place: 3rd. Pisa, Italy?
- Media type: Print (paper)
- Pages: 278
- ISBN: 88-7036-040-7
- OCLC: 39388977

Kredu min, Sinjorino! (Believe me, Madam!) is an Esperanto-language novel by the Scottish writer Cezaro Rossetti. It is listed in William Auld's Basic Esperanto Reading List and was published for the first time in 1950, the same year in which Rossetti died.

== Depiction of the life of a travelling salesman and hawker ==
The book, which the author dedicated to his brother Reto, is an autobiographical novel, which tells of his life and work as a travelling salesman and hawker.

== Translations ==
The book was translated into Hungarian by Sándor Szathmári (Tréfán kívül, 1957). In 2013 the Milan Esperanto Club prepared a translation into Italian, which was then published by the Italian Esperanto Federation.
