= Sándor Szathmári =

Hungarian writer and Esperantist (1897–1974)

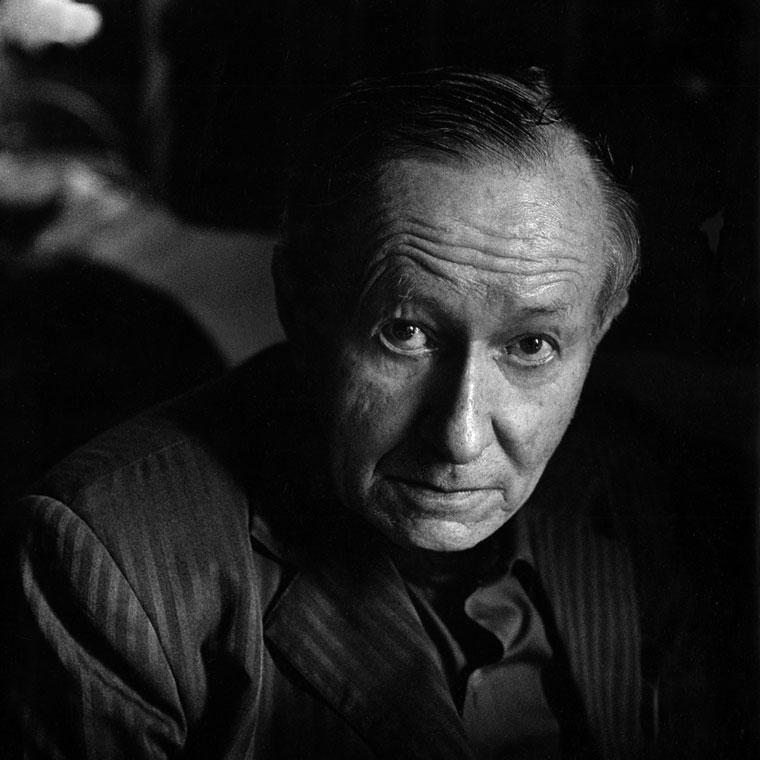
- Born: 19 June 1897; Gyula, Hungary
- Died: 16 July or 27 September 1974 (aged 77); Budapest, Hungary
- Resting place: Farkasréti Cemetery
- Occupations: Writer, translator, mechanical engineer

Szathmári Sándor (Hungarian: [ˈsɒtmaːri ˈʃaːndor]; 19 June 1897 – 16 July 1974) was a Hungarian writer, mechanical engineer, Esperantist, and one of the leading figures in Esperanto literature.

== Biography ==
=== Family background ===
Szathmári was born in Gyula. Szathmári's grandfather was a woodworker who gave 100 forints for the founding of a local music school. His father, also called Sándor, studied law. He was an official of the Austro-Hungarian Empire. He authored law books as a hobby, played the violin and painted. His father, the first intellectual in the family, and his ancestors spelt the family name with a "y" (Szathmáry). Szathmári's mother (Losonczy-Szíjjártó Margit) came from a pharmacist family in the city of Szeghalom, where she was the sole daughter of the family and lived well. She bore 11 children, of whom only seven grew to adulthood.

=== Early life ===
The family moved often. They lived in Gyula, Szombathely, Alsókubin, Sepsiszentgyörgy, and Lugos during Szathmári's early years. The young Szathmári was sickly with a weak body and a sensitive nervous system up through his fifteenth year. He disliked wrestling, horseplay, and boxing. The youth suffered almost continually from angina; he was also tormented by typhus, measles, chickenpox, whooping cough, diphtheria, and sinusitis.

According to a fragment of an unpublished biography Hogy is volt hát? ("So how did it happen?"), his grandfather wanted to train and educate him in patriotism and nationalism, but was unsuccessful. "..my grandfather told me the anecdote in which the gypsy asked to be shown the enemy before a battle, because he wanted to make peace with them. At that time, I thought the anecdote true, and considered the gypsies more advanced, as they were the only ones able to think right.”

After the death of his two older brothers, he became the eldest child (the fourth sibling died later), and often had to take care of the younger ones. That task quite exhausted him, and when the five-month-old little brother John died of meningitis, he went into shock. "The weeping suddenly weakened and finally stopped. After a few minutes pause, I heard my father's voice: When will we bury this child?" For a long time after that, he was unable to sleep peacefully.

While attending the first class in elementary school, he finished the exercises in his mathematics text in one week, without knowing the formulas. He was, by some accounts, more intelligent than his teacher, which led to his teacher giving him a failing grade to force him to repeat the school year. He was let through regardless. This conduct, which he never forgot for the rest of his life, had a lasting impact on him. He referred to his perceived enemies as "muscle-fools".

=== Later studies ===
Szathmári was proficient in other natural sciences, as well as knowledgeable in physics and chemistry. He had a good imagination, liked to experiment and wanted to become an engineer. Szathmári graduated in Lugos (now Lugoj, Romania) and in 1915 enrolled in the mechanical engineering program at the Technical University of Budapest (Hungary), but found this dull and, as he perceived it, limiting to his thoughts. During his studies, conducted under wartime conditions, he lacked sufficient funds and often went hungry. He took a break from his studies from 1919 to 1921 and returned to Lugos. Initially, he wanted to leave Budapest only provisionally due to the communist rule, but an opportunity to teach students at home arose.

=== Life after graduation ===
Following the Treaty of Trianon, Lugos was part of Romania. The Romanians made life difficult for Hungarians and Hungarian officials. In 1921, Szathmári's father had to choose whether to continue serving the Romanian government or to travel to Hungary. The father stayed with the six children and undertook the process of becoming a Romanian official, which cost him the sympathy of his acquaintances, the local Hungarians. After this sacrifice, the Romanian government retired him and forgot to pay his pension.

The Szathmári siblings did not get an opportunity to study at a college or university. Szathmári himself had to interrupt his studies often to help his family. He began working in 1920 in the Ruskica marble mine as a technician. There, he noticed that the mine was tricking the workers by paying a single banknote to three workers. The workers had to travel and spend their own money and time to obtain change. He protested, but did not dare further to make waves.

Although the Hungarian army had found him unsuitable for recruitment six times, the Romanian army required him to enlist. Szathmári decided to return to Hungary and finish his studies. In the spring of 1921, he returned and was approved for a tuition waiver. He completed his studies in 1926 after five years. During 1921-1922, he was unhappy, hungry, and often homeless or living in unheated mass accommodations.

In 1923, Szathmári worked as an office worker in Gyula and lived with relatives. (Earlier, he had taken gravely ill and had been hospitalised). In July 1923, his father died. He lived in actual student housing between 1924 and 1926. Later, he studied next to his work in the Gschwindt plant, and afterwards in the Martin-and-Sigray plant. Starting in 1924, he worked at MÁVAG, a railway machinery plant, and began his true professional life.

==== Politics while a student ====
During his studies, Szathmári participated in the Székely Egyetemi és Főiskolai Hallgatók Egyesülete (SZEFHE, Association of Students of the Székely University and Institutions of Higher Learning), where he became acquainted with the Habsburgellenes Liga (Anti-Habsburg League) and the BARTHA Miklós Társaság (Association of Bartha Miklós). When Charles IV sought to retake the Hungarian throne in 1921, young people took up arms at the call of these organisations and awaited battle at Kelenföld, but without adequate ammunition.

== Professional life ==
From 1924 to 1957, Szathmári worked as an engineer at the Hungarian State Wagonworks (Hungarian acronym: MÁVAG) in the Hungarian Ministry of Heavy Industry and in the project bureau.

== Beliefs ==
=== Esperanto ===
In the empire, the family most often worked among minorities (Slovaks in Alsókubin; Romanians and Germans in Lugos). The young Szathmari was struck early with the problem of inter-ethnic communication. Some Slovaks, for example, laughed at him when he couldn't understand them. He felt himself already an Esperantist in spirit, having begun to wish for a language that would bind the ethnic groups together.

In a bookshop in Lugos, he found and purchased a book of Esperanto grammar. He began to learn Esperanto in 1919, when he returned to Lugos, where he organised the Széchenyi Circle, which served as the basis for the Free Organisation of Christian-Socialist Students. With his friends in the circle, he set about learning Esperanto, but without a teacher. They were successful. Szathmári became a speaker of the language starting in 1935, when he participated in a workers' culture course in Budapest, taught by the famous Esperantist poet Emeriko Baranyai, who helped Szathmári find his way to SAT, of which he remained a member until his 1974 death in Budapest.

=== Other ideologies ===
Szathmári became acquainted with Christian-socialist ideas in 1918. He believed in Jesus, but, following his father's example, did not attend churches. When the family lived in Szombathely, his father wanted to enrol him in the Roman Catholic School, as it was the closest. The school would not admit him because he was not a Roman Catholic. The instructors were surprised, but accepted his father's offer to have his son baptised. The baptism did not take place, but he was still allowed to attend elementary school. Szathmari remained reformed for life, and when he was buried, the services were even led by a reformed pastor.

When the family moved to Alsókubin, the Lutheran pastor explained that they had previously learned errors and could only learn true (Lutheran) faith. Although he left the church, Szathmári remained devout.

=== Politics after his studies ===
In the mid-1920s, Szathmári discovered the ideas of Szabó Dezso and spent some time on the ideological right. As he was the chief secretary of the Anti-Habsburg League, his landlord evicted him. He served as managing director of the BARTHA Miklós Association from 1932 to 1933. Beginning in 1935, he worked in collaboration with the Hungarian Communist Party, but in 1948, he became disillusioned and disowned Communism.

== Szathmari and literature ==
At an early age, Szathmári enjoyed Bible stories, but until 1917 did not take an interest in literature. His high school literature teacher was Vajthoó László, who inspired many students to take an interest in literature. The young Szathmáry thought writing novels a bore compared to inventing ideas for a machine.

In 1917, Szathmári became acquainted with the works of Frigyes Karinthy, whom he later came to adore. Influenced by Karinthy, he began working on a mathematics textbook from 1919 to 1921 and put into writing his first small attempts at belles lettres, titled The Serious Person (A komoly ember). This work evinces a satirical view of someone who speaks of pacifist convictions, but who, in the end, resorts to violence.

Between 1930 and 1934, Szathmári worked on a trilogy of novels, but upon completing them, he did not recognise them as his own work and decided to let them remain unpublished.

In 1935, he began his magnum opus, Kazohinia (Gulliver utazása Kazohiniában, Budapest 1941; Kazohinia Budapest 1957, 1972), a work of satirical science fiction. The 1946 edition contains text that was previously omitted due to military censorship, as well as new details. He would modify the 1957 edition.

=== Works in Esperanto ===
The international Esperanto movement became acquainted with his name only in 1958, after the appearance of his novel Kazohinia in Esperanto (Vojaĝo al Kazohinio). However, he himself stated that his first article in Esperanto was published in 1934 in Sennaciulo (The Nationless). Between the years 1937 and 1942, Szathmari was the managing president of the Hungarian Esperanto-Society.

In addition to Vojaĝo al Kazohinio, which was initially written in 1935, and before the appearance of the Esperanto original, which was published three times in Hungarian translation, there appeared in book form Szathmári's short story collection Maŝinmondo ("MachineWorld") (J. Régulo, 1964), Tréfán kívül, a translation into Hungarian of the Esperanto novel Kredu min, sinjorino! (Believe me, Madam!) by Cezaro Rossetti (1957) and the Esperanto translation of a Hungarian children's book Ĉu ankau vi scias? ("Do you know it too?"). Szathmári is represented in the short story anthology "33 Rakontoj" (lit. '33 Stories') by J. Régulo (1964) with one short story.

Other short fiction by Szathmári appeared in reviews such as Norda Prismo, La Nica Literatura Revuo, Belarto, Monda Kulturo and Hungara Vivo. He contributed articles about the Esperanto movement and about literary themes to other magazines. Szathmari was not prolific, but, despite stylistic deficiencies (which some have emphasised), put himself up as one of the most serious contributors to Esperanto prose and was arguably the only writer of Esperanto prose notable outside of its circle of speakers. His work frequently addressed the future of humanity.

=== The Matter of Tamkó Sirató Károly ===
In 1924, in his new lodgings, he met a youth, with whom he became friends and later enemies. His roommate at school was Tamkó Sirató Károly, then still Tamkó Károly, who was studying law and later became an eminent figure in Hungarian avant-garde poetry. He started a lawsuit in 1958 against Szathmári, claiming that he had also collaborated in the writing of "Kazohinia". Szathmári won the lawsuit. (Tamkó began the lawsuit only after the third edition (1957)). Szathmári's novel Hiába ("In Vain") could be proven to be in the same style as that of the winner, but the appearance of this anti-Communist work in 1958 would have put him in danger of prison. Tamkó read Szathmári's trilogy only in 1936, when he returned from Paris.

== List of works ==
=== Original ===
==== In Esperanto ====
- Vojago al Kazohinio (SAT, 1958) ("Voyage to Kazohinia")
- Masinmondo kaj aliaj noveloj (1964) ("MachineWorld and other Stories")
- Kain kaj Abel (1977) ("Cain and Abel")
- Perfekta civitano (La Laguna, 1964) (1988) ("A Perfect Citizen") (a short story collection with bibliography)

==== Satirical works ====
- Perfekta civitano (1956) ("A Perfect Citizen")
- Pythagoras (1957?)
- Logos (1961)
- La fluidumo de la ciovido (1962)
- Honorigo (1963)
- Liriko (1964)
- Genezo (1965)
- Enciclopeditis (1966)
- Budapesta ekzameno (1968)
- Kain kaj Abel (1968)
- Tria prego de Pygmalion (1969) ("Pygmalion's Third Prayer")
- La falsa auguro (1970) ("The False Prophecy")
- La guarbo (1970)
- Kuracistaj historioj (1972) ("Physician's Stories")
- La barbaro (1972) ("The Barbarian")
- Superstico (1972?) ("Superstition")

==== In Hungarian ====
- M. Fehér asszony, fekete férfi (Budapest, 1936)
- Halálsikoly az áradatban (Budapest, 1937)
- Kazohinia (Budapest, 1941)
- Gépvilág és más fantasztikus történetek (Budapest, 1972)
- Hiába (Budapest, 1991)

=== Translations into Hungarian ===
- Kredu min, Sinjorino ("Believe me, Madam!") de Cezaro Rosetti

== Sources ==
Vikipedio article in Esperanto
