= Voyage to Faremido =

1916 novel by Frigyes Karinthy

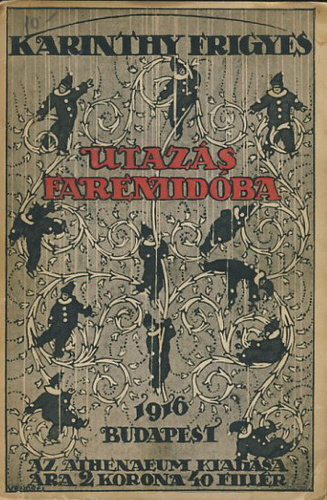
- Voyage to Faremido book cover
- Author: Frigyes Karinthy
- Original title: Utazás Faremidóba
- Translator: Paul Tabori
- Cover artist: Lilla Lóránt
- Language: Hungarian
- Genre: Novel
- Publisher: Corvina Press
- Publication date: 1916
- Publication place: Hungary
- English publication date: 1965
- Media type: Print (Hardback & Paperback)
- Followed by: Capillaria

Voyage to Faremido (Hungarian: Utazás Faremidóba, 1916) is a utopian-satirical novel by Frigyes Karinthy. Written as a further adventure of Lemuel Gulliver of Gulliver's Travels, it recounts the story of a World War I pilot who crashes on a planet of inorganic beings. Their ideal society is contrasted with that of the contemporary world.

== Plot summary ==
The novel describes the adventures of a pilot who loses his way and comes to a world inhabited by intelligent beings that consist of inorganic materials (thus having a superficial similarity to robots). They help the protagonist to see the beauty of their world and also help him to return home. The closing chapters elaborate that these beings not only understand the secrets of nature, but they are the secret of nature themselves — they are nature personified.

== Language and title ==
The term "Faremido" has a clear explanation: the inhabitants of Faremido use a language consisting purely of musical sounds (thus, their language is harmonic in the most literal sense). Every word is transcribed in the novel using syllables of solfege: sequences of the syllables Do, Re, Mi, Fa, So, La, Si. For example: "solasi", "Midore", "Faremido" etc. (Such a language had indeed been devised earlier: See Solresol.) In fact, all terms should be intoned instead of pronounced. Thus, in this world a musical language is used. The protagonist remarks that their speech is both wise (in the meaning) and beautiful (as music), thus thought and feeling are blurred to be the same for these beings.

== Related works ==
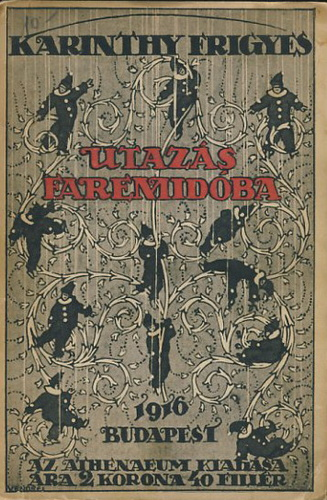
First edition

Kazohinia (written by Sándor Szathmári) is another example of utopian-satirical literature, contrasting the contemporary world (in this case society before WW2) with a fictional paradise. Its main topic is similar: nature, mankind's relatedness to it; rationality versus emotion; intelligent beings as part of a cosmic order.

In 2010, Hungarian conductor-composer Gregory Vajda composed an instrumental work, Gulliver in Faremido, based on Voyage to Faremido. The work is for five instruments and narrator.

Voyage to Faremido has a sequel, Capillaria: both are written by the same author, and they are presented as Gulliver's subsequent travels.

== Publishing history ==
- Karinthy, Frigyes (1916). Utazás Faremidóba; Gulliver ötödik útja (in Hungarian). Budapest: Athenaeum.
- Karinthy, Frigyes (1921). Capillária (in Hungarian) (first ed.).
- Karinthy, Frigyes (1957). Utazás Faremidóba. Capillária (in Hungarian). Budapest: Szépirodalmi Könyvkiadó.
- Karinthy, Frigyes (1965). Voyage to Faremido. Capillaria. Introduced and translated by Paul Tabori. Budapest: Corvina Press.
- Karinthy, Frigyes (1966). Voyage to Faremido. Capillaria. Introduced and translated by Paul Tabori. New York: Living Books.
- Karinthy, Frigyes (1983). Die neuen Reisen des Lemuel Gulliver (in German). Translated by Hans Skirecki. Berlin: Verlag Das Neue Berlin.
