= Viktor Erdei =

Hungarian sculptor and painter (1897–1945)

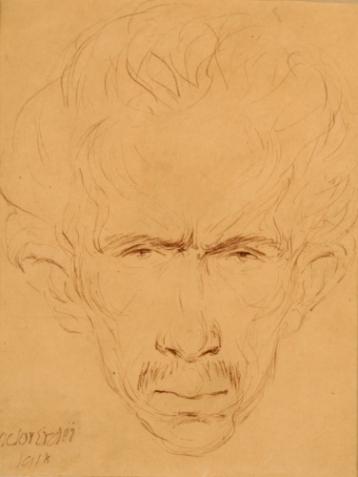
- Self portrait of Viktor Erdei
- Born: 16 October 1879; Budapest, Austria-Hungary
- Died: 9 March 1945 (aged 65); Budapest, Hungary
- Education: Hungarian University of Fine Arts
- Movement: Nagybánya artists' colony, OMIKE
- Spouse: Ada Karinthy

Viktor Erdei, known as Győző Epstein until 1906 (Budapest, 16 October 1879 – Budapest, 9 March 1945) was a Hungarian sculptor, graphic artist and painter. He was the husband of Frigyes Karinthy's sister, the painter Ada Karinthy.

== Life ==
He was born as the son of Vilmos Epstein and Róza Kuttner. In the summer of 1899, he visited Simon Hollósy's free school in Nagybánya artists' colony, and in the same year he exhibited charcoal drawings in the Hungarian National Salon. He was a student of Bertalan Székely at the Model Drawing School (today: Hungarian University of Fine Arts) in 1899–1900. In 1903, he worked again in Nagybánya, then with Károly Ferenczy. In 1905 he participated in the exhibition of the Hall of Art (Old man, charcoal drawing), in 1907 he organized his first collection exhibition of oil paintings, drawings, etchings and a head sculpture. KÉVE was founded around this time he was a founding member of an artist group and participated in the group's exhibitions.

On 14 June 1908 he married Ada Karinthy, sister of Frigyes Karinthy, daughter of Ernő József Karinthi and Karolina Szeréna Engel. Their marriage was dissolved in 1922, but they married again on 21 June 1924 in Budapest.

In 1908-1909 he went on a study trip to Munich, and in 1912 to Paris. In 1911 he presented his works in Nagyvára and in 1912 in Szeged, and in 1915 he appeared at the Military and Public Health Exhibition with his charcoal drawings of soldiers lying in hospitals. He produced lithographs for Béla Révész's Beethoven, Miniature volumes. He emigrated after the fall of the Council of Ministers. He returned home from Vienna in 1924 and settled in Nagyszőlős.

In 1926, he held his second collection exhibition at the National Salon in Budapest. "There is no corrupting quality in him, no charm of color, no charming temperament, but even more aloofness, puritanism of expression, abstinence to the point of coldness from all cheap influences." Artúr Elek described his art in the West. – [Erdei is] “not one artist, but two. One is represented by his paintings, portraits, landscapes, smaller compositions, the other by his drawings. The first is the fine tone painter he was trained to become in Nagybánya. In addition, however, he is also a soul seeker, who tenderly evokes the mirror flashes of the shameful soul from the shadows. In his entire work, these portraits are his most finished creations, because in them the will, the intention, the instinct have united into reality in the most complete harmony."

During the decade spent in Nagyszőlős, he studied the life of Transcarpathian Jews, drawing and painting their traditions and lives. He presented the fruits of this era in his third collection exhibition in 1934, this time at the Ernst Museum. After that, he lived in Budapest again. From 1939, his drawings appeared at the exhibitions of the fine arts group of OMIKE, the last time in March 1944. He was forced to experience the siege of the capital in the Budapest ghetto, where he died shortly after its liberation. He was remembered by György Sándor Gál as "a wonderfully fine graphic artist."

== Gallery ==
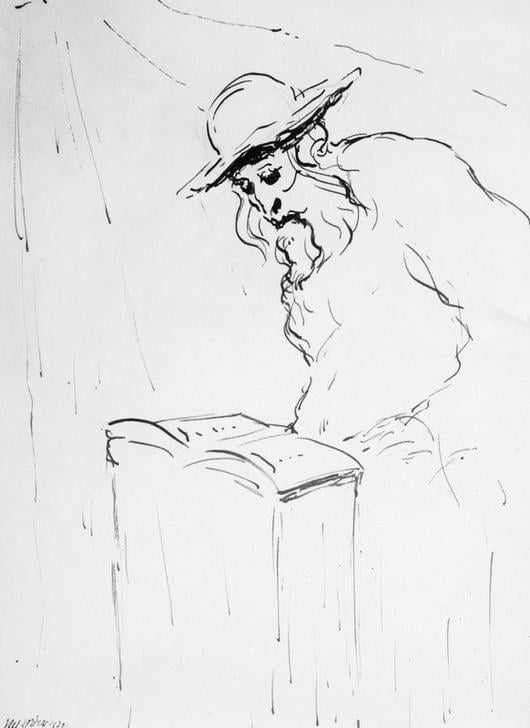

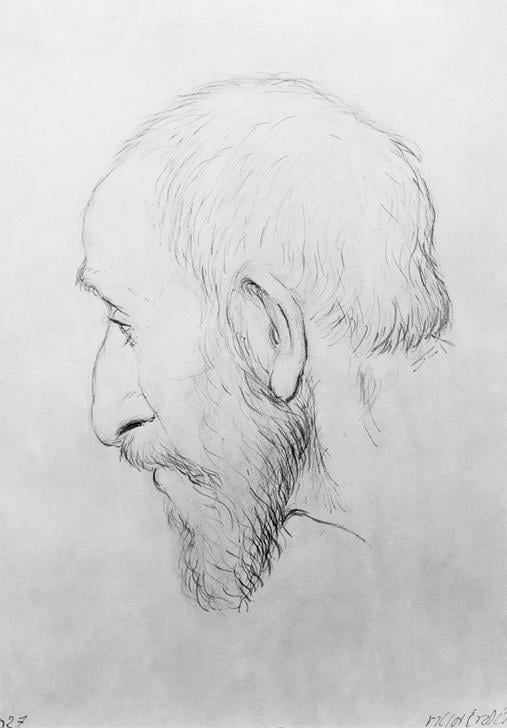

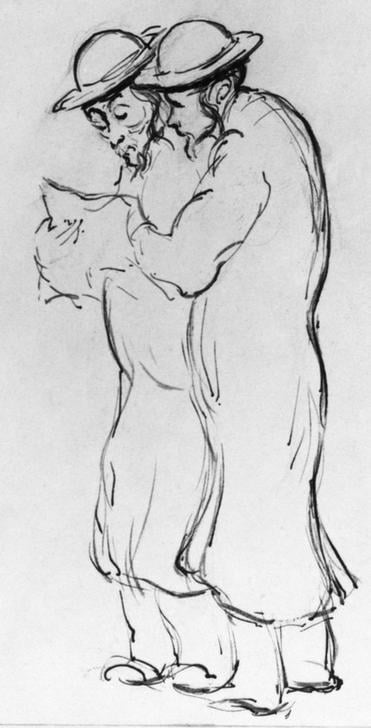

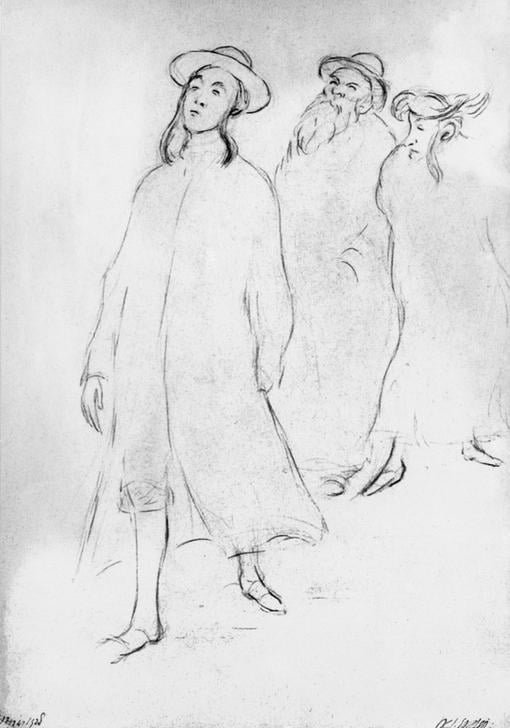
