= Láng Machine Factory =

Hungarian machine factory

Láng Machine Factory (Hungarian: Láng Gépgyár) was a Hungarian machine factory in Vizafogó that played an important role in supplying Hungarian power plants and factories with steam engines, turbines and diesel motors.

Founded in 1868 by László Láng as a machine repair workshop, the company started producing steam engines in 1873 and became the largest manufacturer of steam engines for factories and ships by the 1890s. The company also made equipment for the distilling, sugar, and canning industries. The generators providing electric power to the Millenium Underground Railway were generated by Láng steam engines.

From 1890, the company produced pumps, compressors, hydraulic tools, and electric crane machines. In 1893, the firm started to produce electric elevators. From 1905, the production of steam turbines for alternators began. In 1910 the factory extended its product portfolio with boilers and Diesel Engines for factories, power plants and ships. During the Great Depression it manufactured printing machinery as well.

Capital was needed for the continuous renewal: the family business became a joint-stock company in 1911, the founder László Láng retired and his son Gusztáv Láng was appointed as CEO. The factory continued to keep pace with technical progress and maintained its leading role in Hungarian machinery manufacturing. The increasingly powerful, stationary four-stroke diesel engines were primarily designed for power and industrial plants.

The product range was constantly expanding. In addition to traditional products such as industrial power engines and boilers, the company also produced complete plants for the chemical and food industries, and during the economic crisis, printing machinery. The equipment for Hungarian sugar factories was supplied mainly by the Láng machinery factory, but its tomato concentrating lines also became famous. In the meantime, a decades-long tradition of vehicle and ship engine production gradually developed. In Hungary, the Láng factory was the first to produce diesel engines for railway traction. Diesel engines for buses and lorries were also produced until nationalisation.

On July 1, 1915, another significant event occurred in the history of the factory: Láng Gépgyár merged with the Hazai Machine Factory Company. The latter included the Eisele Machine Factory, which was adjacent to the Láng factory. The machines from this factory were very popular and were used in the buildings of the Water Works, the Gas Works, and the Electric Works. The buses of the 1930s and 40s operated with Diesel engines manufactured by Láng Gépgyár.

During the Second World War, the factory's production was adapted to the needs of the army, but it continued to produce steam turbines and boilers for civilian use.

After being nationalised in 1948, power generating machinery became the main focus of the company. Due to dwindling contracts and obsolete technology the production of Láng declined in the 1980s and it was acquired by ABB in 1990.

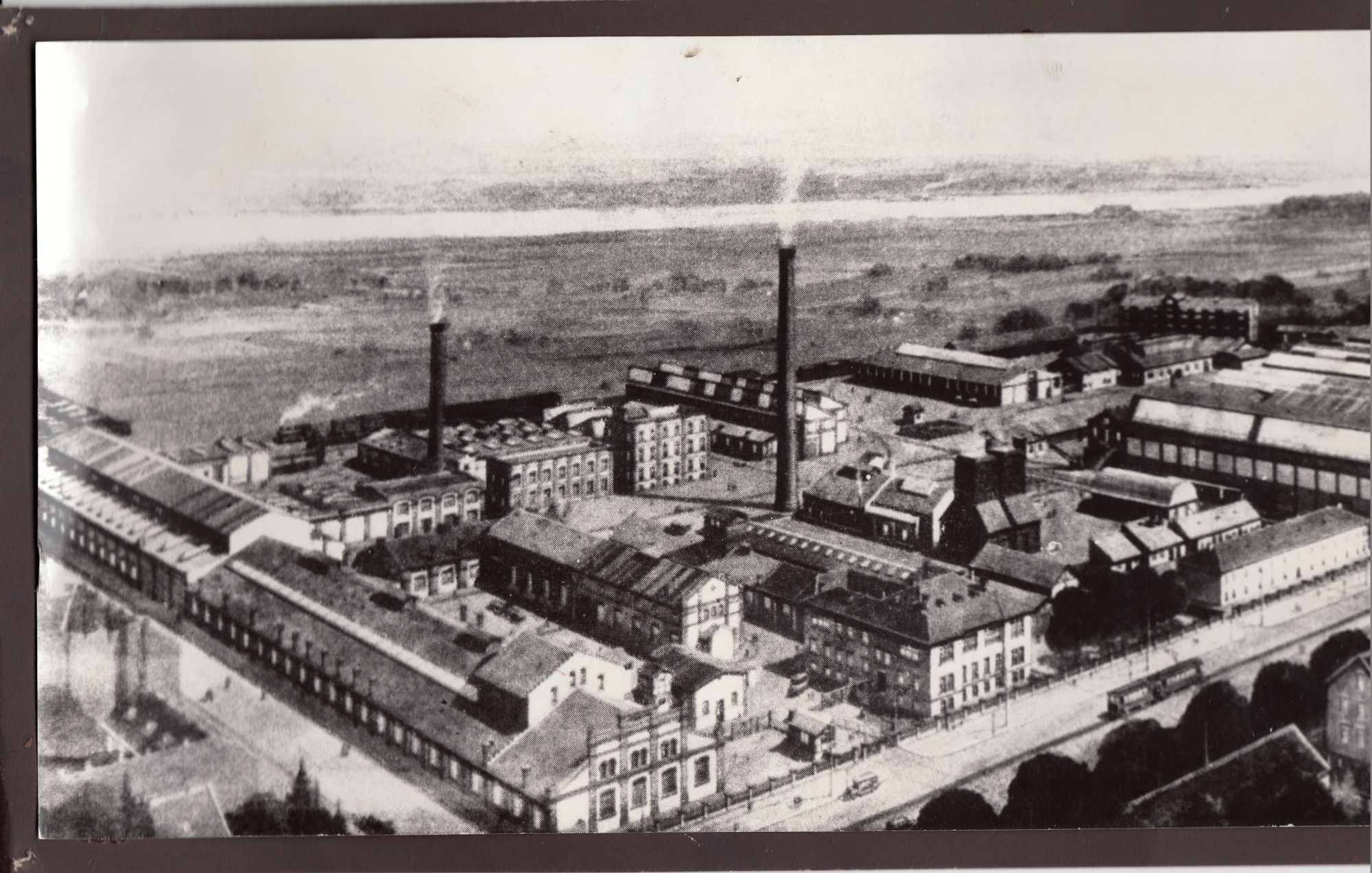
Láng Machine factory in 1908

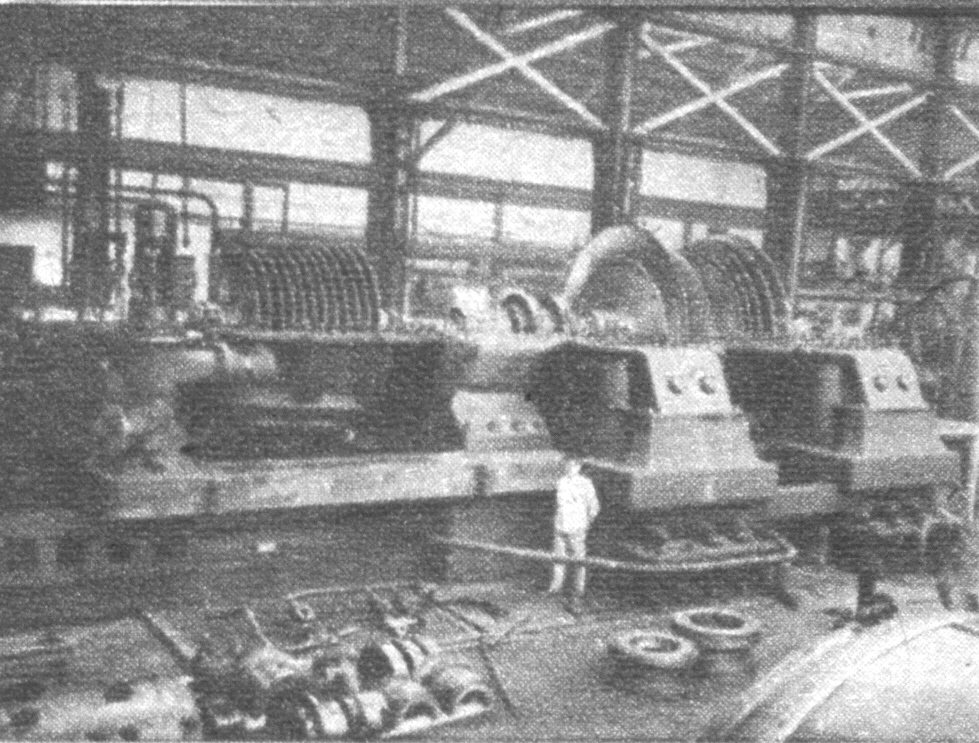
36 700 hp steam turbine under construction, 1913

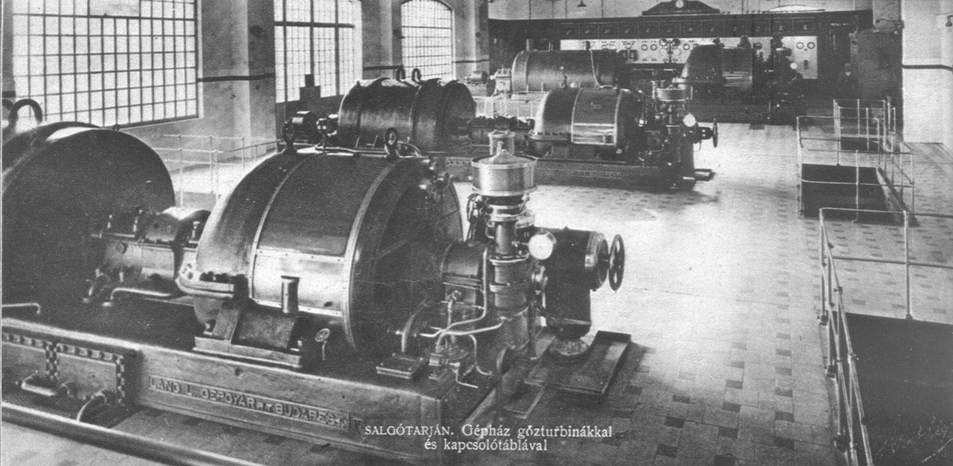
Láng turbogenerators in the Salgótarján Colliery Company, 1915

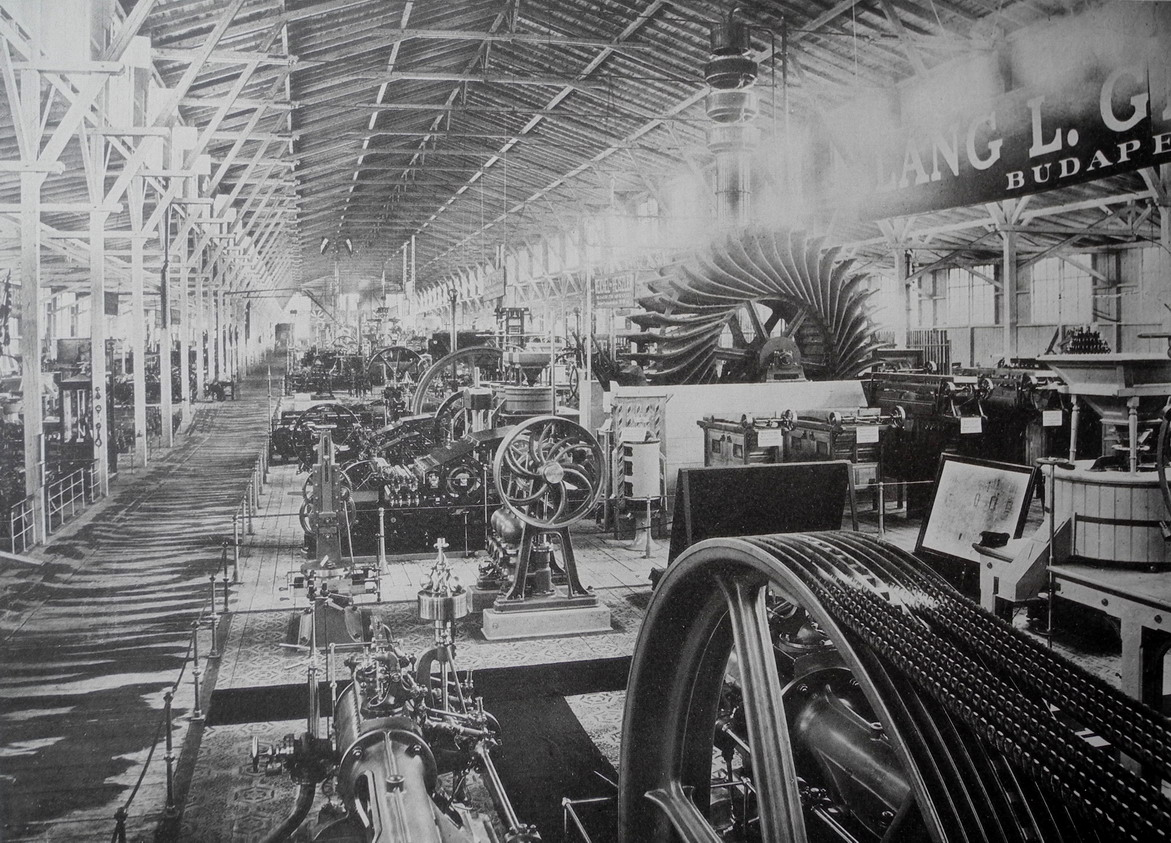
Diesel Engines of the Láng Machine Factory in 1910.

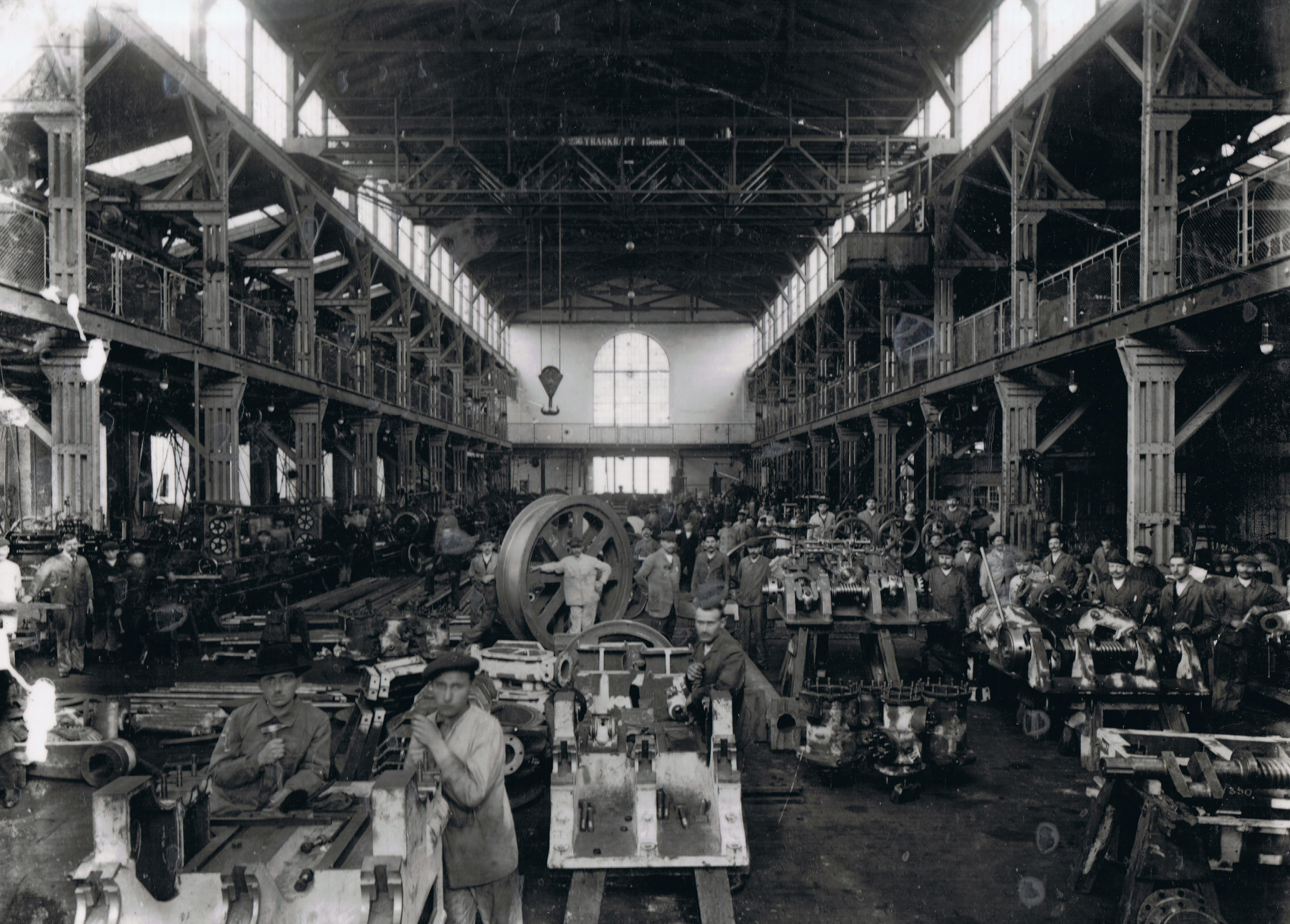
One of the assembly halls for Diesel Engines in 1910

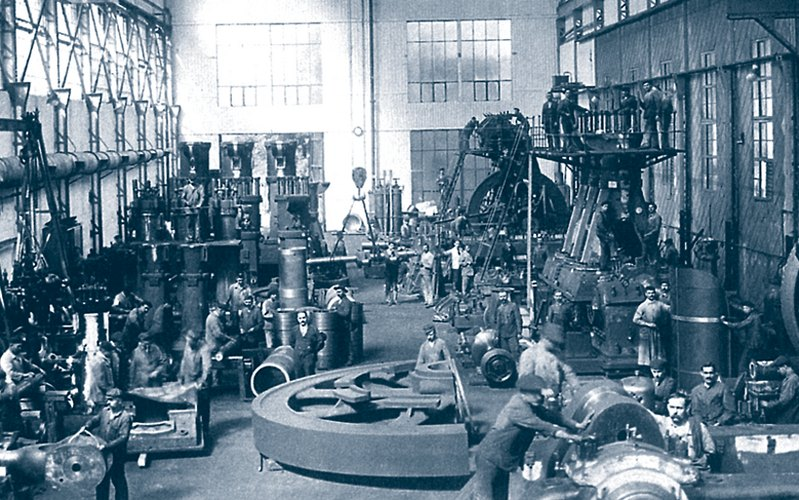
Assembly hall for large Diesel Engines in 1911

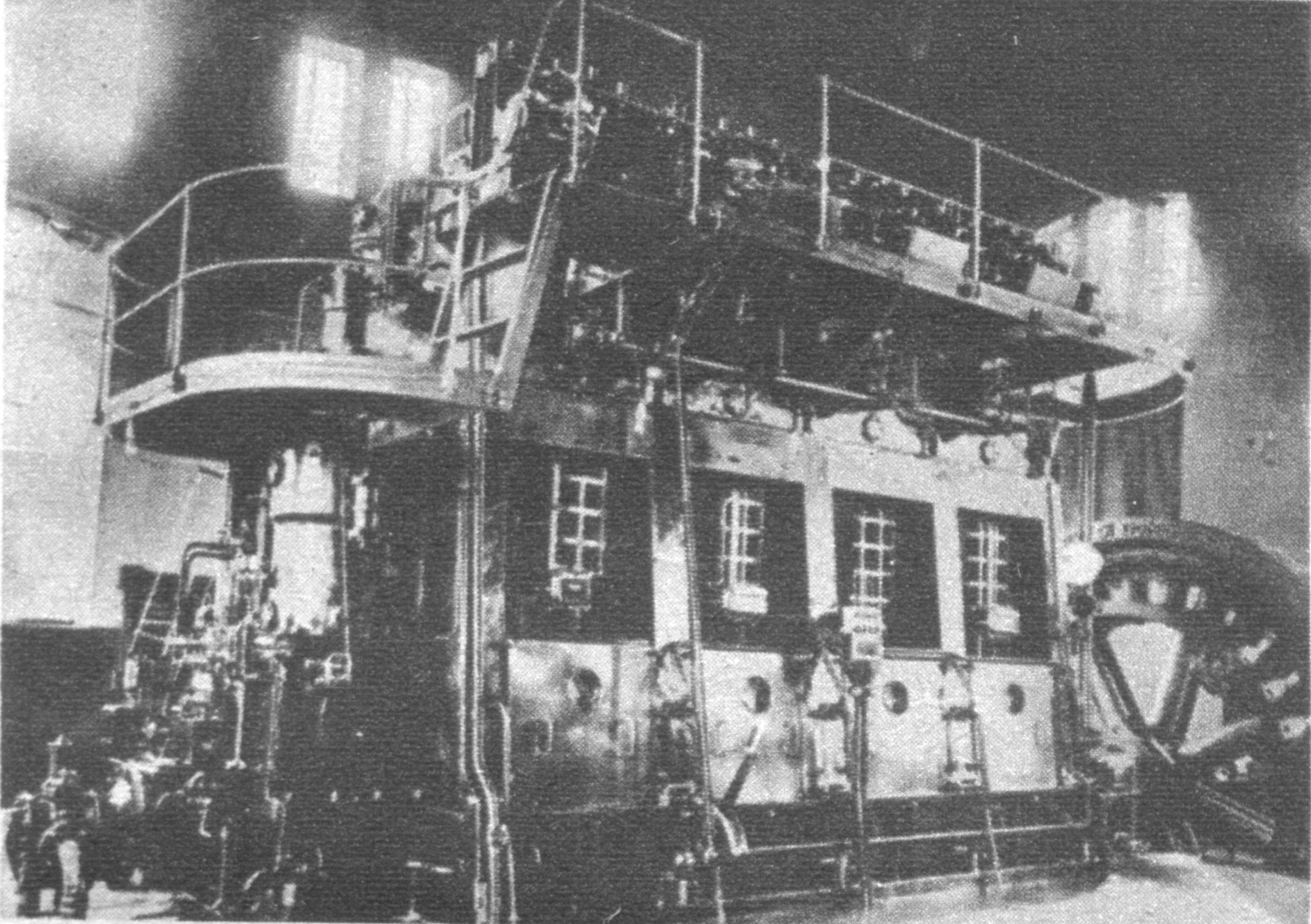
Láng Diesel Engine for power stations (1913)

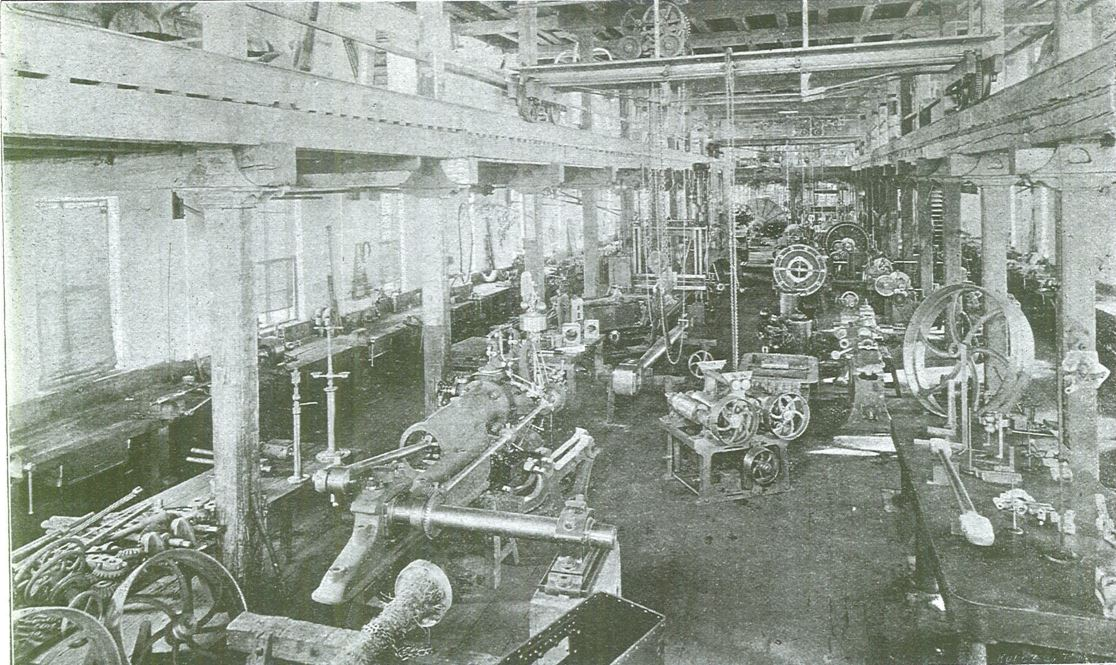
Petrol engine assembly hall, 1896

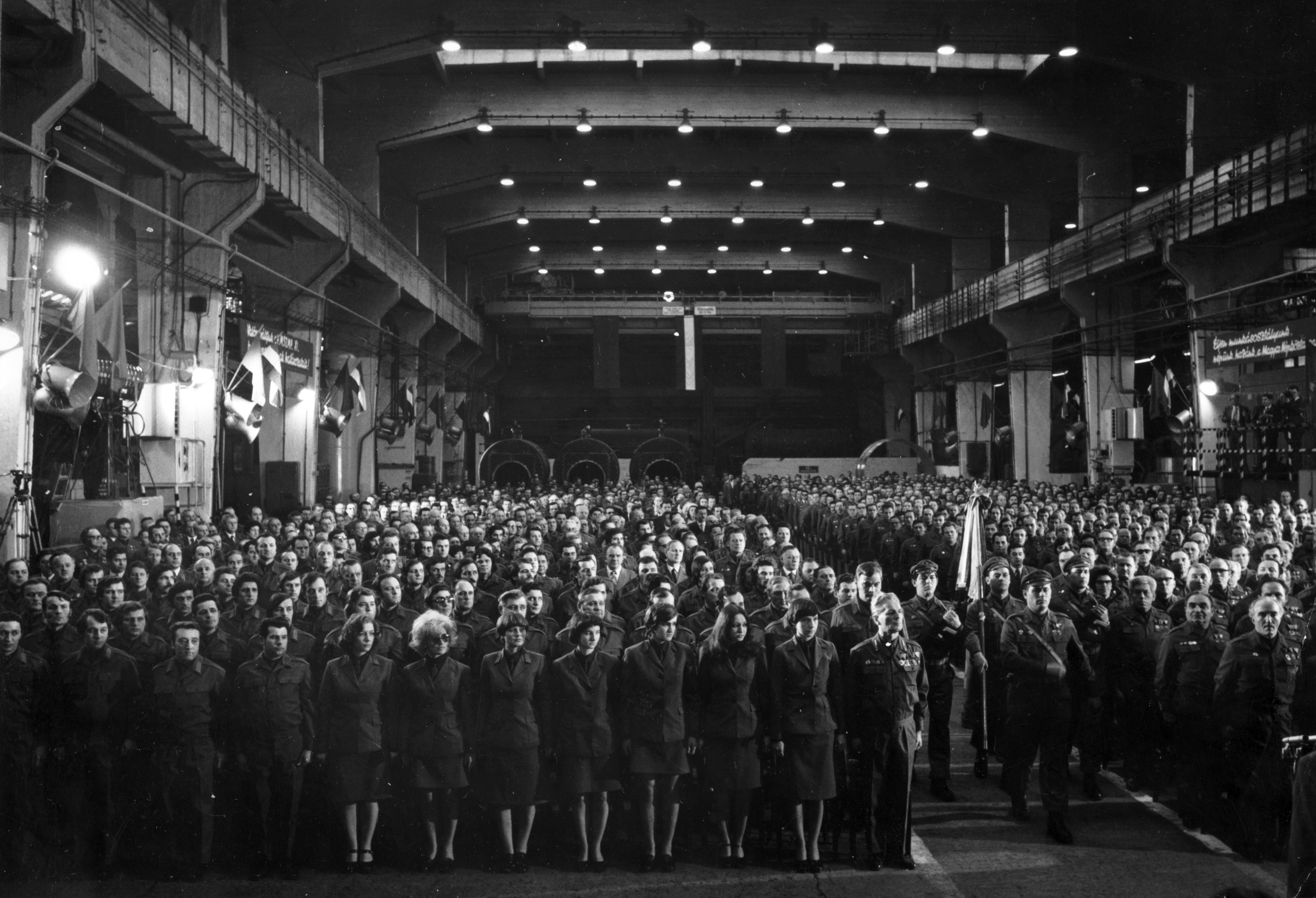
Workers' Militia event inside the factory, 1977
