= Ferenc Karinthy =

Hungarian writer

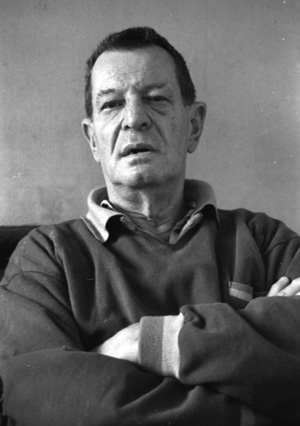
Ferenc Karinthy in 1991

Ferenc Karinthy (June 2, 1921 – February 29, 1992) was a Hungarian novelist, playwright, journalist, editor and translator, as well as a water polo champion. He authored more than a dozen novels. His father was the writer and journalist Frigyes Karinthy. His mother, the psychiatrist Aranka Böhm, was killed in 1944 in Auschwitz.

Spring Comes to Budapest was the first of Karinthy's novels to be translated into English (Corvina Press, 1964). His novel Epepe was later translated into English as Metropole and published by Telegram Books in 2008.

== Biography ==
Ferenc Karinthy was born in Budapest, the second son of the Hungarian writer Frigyes Karinthy. He wrote his first novel, Don Juan éjszakája (Don Juan's night) in 1943 while studying literature and linguistics at Pázmány Péter University. In 1945 he was awarded a PhD in linguistics.

Karinthy worked as a script editor for Nemzeti Színház and Madách Theatre, as well as theatres in Miskolc, Szeged and Debrecen. Between 1957 and 1960, Karinthy translated a number of writers into Hungarian including Machiavelli and Molière. He won a number of awards for his own writing including the Baumgarten Prize, the Attila József Prize and the Kossuth Prize.

Karinthy died in Budapest in 1992. Napló (Journal), the diary Karinthy kept between 1969 and 1991, was published posthumously in 1994.

== Epepe (Metropole) ==
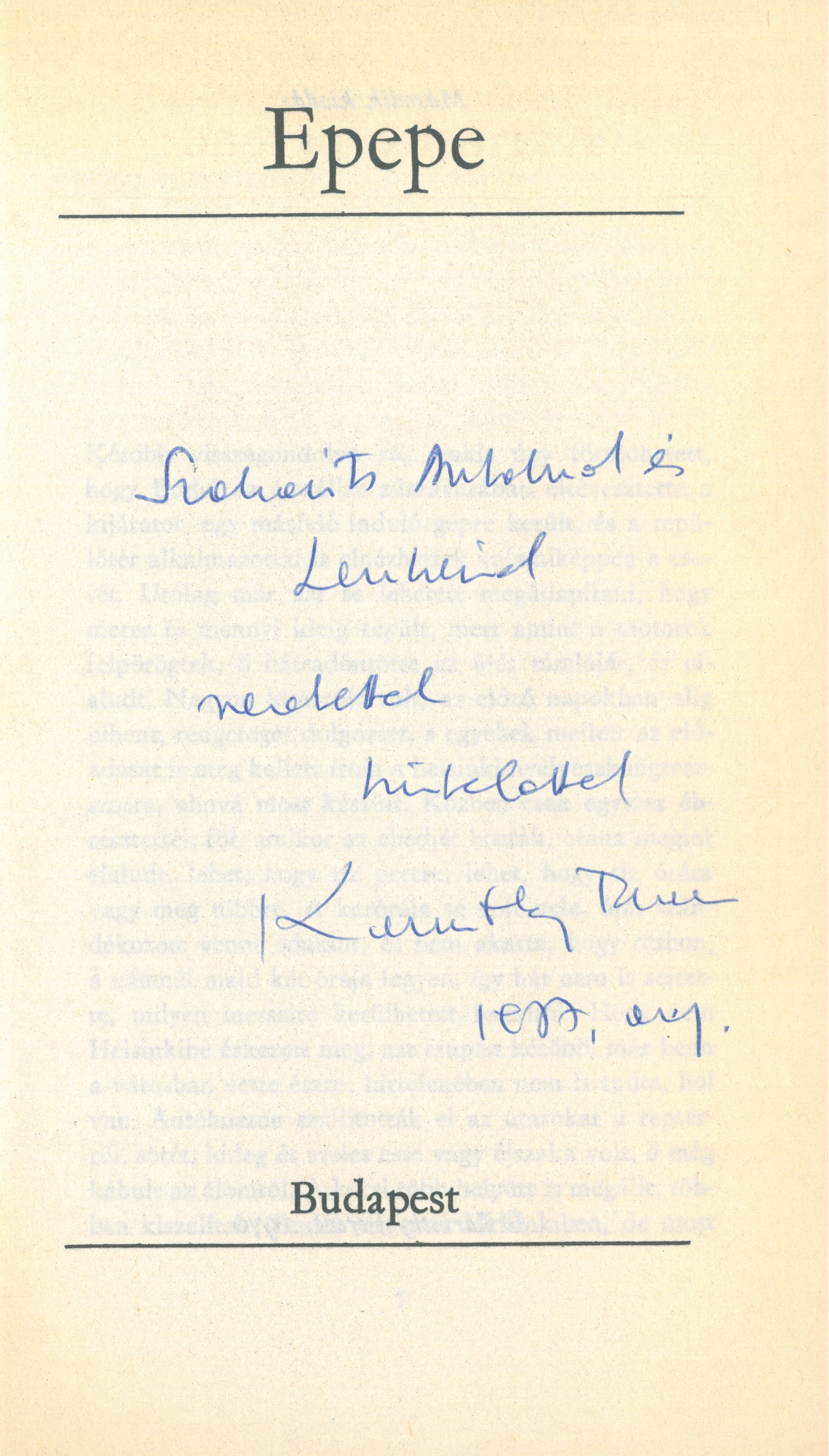
Epepe

Epepe, written in 1970, is the most well-known of Karinthy's novels to be translated into English, appearing as Metropole in 2008.

This essentially Kafkaesque tale follows the travails of Budai, a linguist who steps off a plane expecting to be in Helsinki but finds himself in a sprawling and densely populated metropolis whose residents speak an unknown and unintelligible language. Budai is swept along with the crowd to a hotel, where he tries in vain to explain his predicament.

With no route home apparent, Budai spends his days trying to learn what he can about the city and the language but is frustrated at every turn. The only person with whom he has any kind of relationship is Epepe, who operates the lift in his hotel. But even she can't help when Budai's money runs out and his situation becomes ever more desperate.

== Bibliography ==
- Don Juan éjszakája (Don Juan's night) (1943)
- Szellemidézés (1947)
- Budapesti tavasz (Spring Comes to Budapest) (1953)
- Hazai tudósítások (Reports from Home) (1954)
- Irodalmi történetek (Literary Stories) (1956)
- Ferencvárosi szív (A Fan of Ferencváros) (1959)
- Négykezes (Piece for Four Hands) (1967)
- Epepe (Metropole) (1970)
- Harminchárom (Thirty-three) (1977)
- Napló (Journal) (1994)
