= Capillaria =

1921 satirical fantasy novel by Frigyes Karinthy

Capillaria.
- Author: Frigyes Karinthy
- Original title: Capillária.
- Translator: Paul Tabori
- Cover artist: Lilla Lóránt
- Language: Hungarian
- Genre: Fantasy
- Publisher: Corvina Press
- Publication date: 1921
- Publication place: Hungary
- English publication date: 1965
- Media type: Print (hardcover & paperback)
- Preceded by: Voyage to Faremido

Capillaria (Hungarian: Capillária, 1921) is a fantasy novel by Hungarian author Frigyes Karinthy, which depicts an undersea world inhabited exclusively by women and recounts, in a satirical vein reminiscent of the style of Jonathan Swift, the first time that men and women experience sex with one another.

Expressing a pessimistic view of gender relations, the novel is set in a world where women, portrayed as emotional and illogical, dominate men, the creative, rational force within humanity who represent the builders of civilization.

The males, known as "bullpops", are of small stature. They spend their time building and rebuilding tall, complex, suggestively phallic towers that the gigantic women destroy as quickly as these structures are erected. Meanwhile, the females engage in sexual adventures, surviving by eating the brains of the miniature men, who have become little more than personified male genitals.

The undersea kingdom is mentioned in the comic book version of The League of Extraordinary Gentlemen.

A readily available summary of the relatively rare novel's plot is provided in The Dictionary of Imaginary Places.

== Adaptations ==
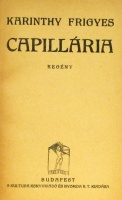
First edition title page

A radio dramatisation of Capillaria titled Voyage to Capiilaria was transmitted on BBC Radio 3 on 17 February 1976. It was adapted for radio by George Mikes and produced and directed by Martin Esslin. It featured the voices of John Rowe as Gulliver, Jane Wenham as the Queen of Capillaria, as well as Norma Ronald, Garard Green and others.

== Related works ==
Capillaria is the sequel to Karinthy's 1916 novel, Voyage to Faremido, in which the protagonist is transported from the battlefields of World War I to Faremido, where he encounters men of steel with musical voices and brains composed of a "mixture of quicksilver and minerals." The two works are presented by the author as the fifth and sixth journeys of Gulliver.

Some publishers have released the two works in a combined volume, one German edition using the title The New Travels of Lemuel Gulliver (German: Die neuen Reisen des Lemuel Gulliver). However, the novels have little in common; Voyage to Faremido is an example of utopian literature, while the main focus of Capillaria is the dystopian coexistence of men and women.

== See also ==
- Voyage to Faremido
- Kazohinia

== Sources ==
- Karinthy, Frigyes (1916). Utazás Faremidóba; Gulliver ötödik útja (in Hungarian). Budapest: Athenaeum.
- Karinthy, Frigyes (1921). Capillária (in Hungarian) (first ed.).
- Karinthy, Frigyes (1965). Voyage to Faremido. Capillaria. Introduced and translated by Paul Tabori. Budapest: Corvina Press.
- Karinthy, Frigyes (1966). Voyage to Faremido. Capillaria. Introduced and translated by Paul Tabori. New York: Living Books.
- Karinthy, Frigyes (1976). Utazás Faremidóba. Capillária (in Hungarian). Budapest: Szépirodalmi Könyvkiadó.
- Karinthy, Frigyes (1983). Die neuen Reisen des Lemuel Gulliver (in German). Translated by Hans Skirecki. Berlin: Verlag Das Neue Berlin.
- Manguel, Albert; Gianni Guadalupi (1999) [1980]. The Dictionary of Imaginary Places. New York: Harcourt, Brace, Jovanovich. ISBN 9780151005413.
