= Reto Rossetti =

Esperantist professor

Reto Rossetti (11 April 1909 – 20 September 1994) was a British poet and an Esperantist professor. He was Italian-Swiss and retained his nationality, although he lived all his life in Britain. His professional career as a teacher in art colleges culminated as Head of the art education department at Bristol university. His elder brother was Cezaro Rossetti, author of Kredu min, sinjorino! (Believe me, Ma'am!). He died at Gosport.

== Creative life ==
His poetry appeared in the compendium, Kvaropo (Quartet). Poems by Rossetti used to appear in the Esperanto (newspaper) press.

With his brother, Cezaro Rossetti (Caesar), he wrote and illustrated 'The Moc Gonnogal' – a collection of poems written as a spoof on the work of the Scottish poet William McGonnogal.

His other works are: Mestizo de l' Mondo (Mestizo of the World), a collection of poems; El la Maniko (Out of my Sleeve); and Pinta krajono (Sharp Pencil), a collection of novellas. His main translation is Otelo (Othello) by Shakespeare. Rossetti did many translations from English poetry. He was the editor and main collaborator on the Angla Antologio.

Three of his works are on William Auld's Basic Esperanto Reading List: El la maniko, 33 Rakontoj, Pinta krajono.

== Works ==
=== Original in Esperanto ===
- Oazo (poetry collection in Kvaropo (1952))
- Mestizo de l' Mondo
- El la maniko (a collection of novellas, 1955)
- Pinta krajono (a collection of poems, 1959)

=== Translations ===
- Otelo

=== Edited publications ===
- 33 Rakontoj, La Esperanta novelaro with Ferenc Szilágyi
- Angla Antologio with William Auld

== Sources ==
The first version of this article is a translation of the corresponding article in the Esperanto Wikipedia.
