= Vizafogó =

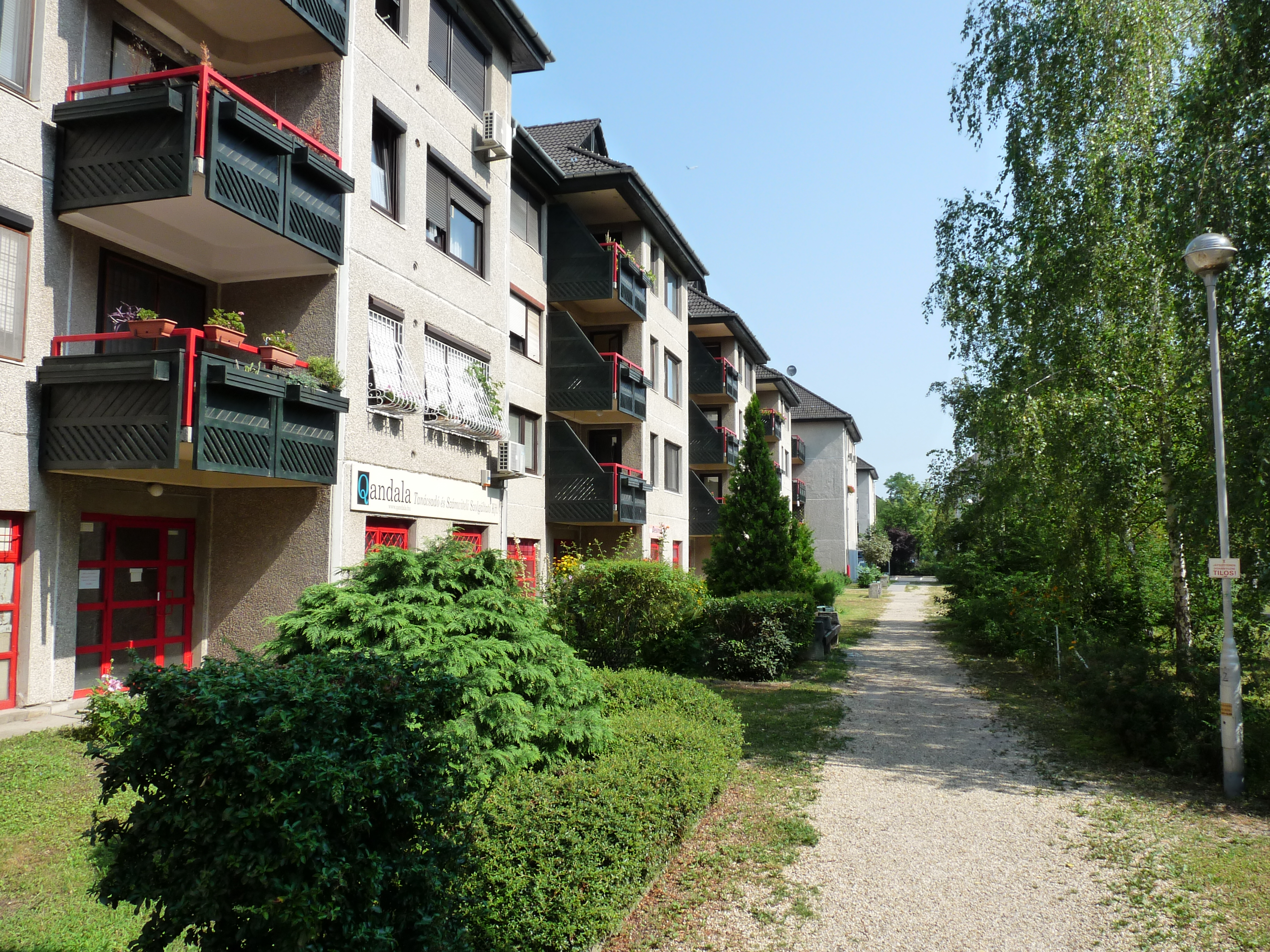
- Between 1987 and 1989, four-story Panelház with tiled roofs were built in the Vizafogó lakótelep (housing estate)
- Interactive map of Vizafogó
- Coordinates: 47°32′59.12″N 19°7′5.94″E
- Country: Hungary
- City: Budapest
- District: 13th district of Budapest

Population (2022)
  - Total: 17,821

Vizafogó is a neighborhood in the 13th district of Budapest. It lies between the Danube and Váci út, north of Újlipótváros, extending to Dráva Street in the south and Meder Street in the north.

== History ==
The area north of the Árpád Bridge, historically known as Lepsi, is protected by the Vizafogó (literally "Beluga sturgeon (Viza) Catcher") dam from which the neighborhood gets its name. It was built between The Dráva and the mouth of the Rákos Stream between 1870 and 1878. In the years following, and by the end of the 19th century a significant industrial area had developed in the area, with numerous factories, steam mills and other plants being constructed. The Árpád Bridge overpass was built on the site of the historical Zarzetzky match factory, and to the north of it the factories founded by László Láng, which were later merged under the name of the Láng Machine Factory. Turbina Street, located here, was originally called László Láng Street.

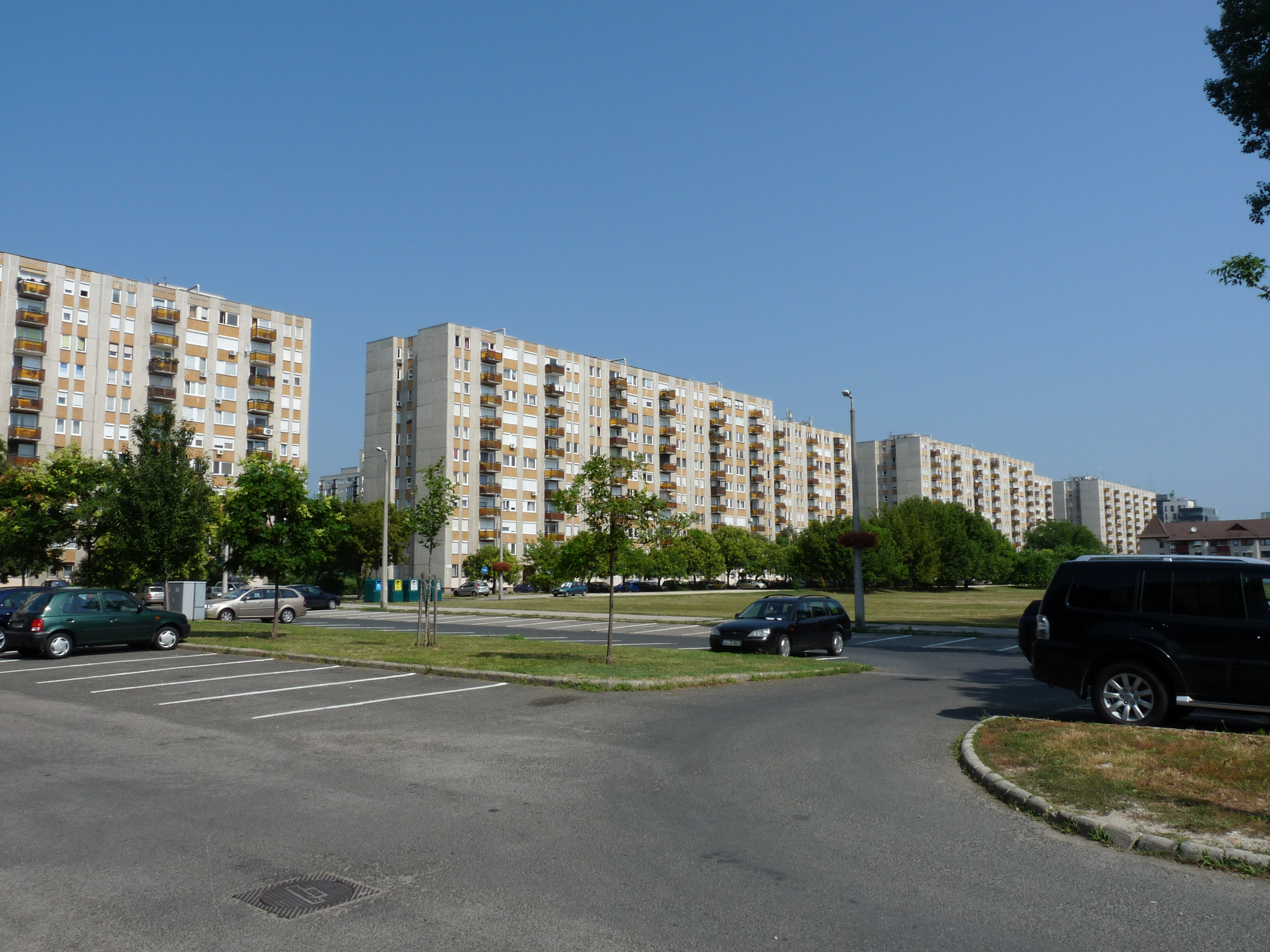
11-story panel buildings in Budapest, 13th district (Vizafogó)

By the beginning of the 20th century, the shrubby Danube bank had been filled in. In the Rákos stream area, the Vuk and Sons Sawmill was located on the site of the present-day sewage treatment plant. In the 1930s, the police houses were built in Dagály Street. The Dagály bath (High-tide Bath) was opened in 1948, then known as Szabadság (freedom) beach bath. Since then, it has been renovated several times. Opposite it, from 1961, were the grounds of the Forestry and Pipe fitting SC respectively. On the northern side of the road leading to Árpád Bridge, further all-comfort cooperative houses were built between 1961 and 1966. In 2006, a housing estate was built on the western part of the Erdért track. On the eastern side, around 1977, a tennis hall was built on the site of the handball court.

South of the Árpád Bridge to Dráva Street, along the siding that used to serve the Vizafogó freight station, a slum, along Váci út, the Hétház and Tirirzáhár houses were home to working-class families. From 1940 on the west side of the railway line, a Romani settlement was established up to Népfürdő Street.

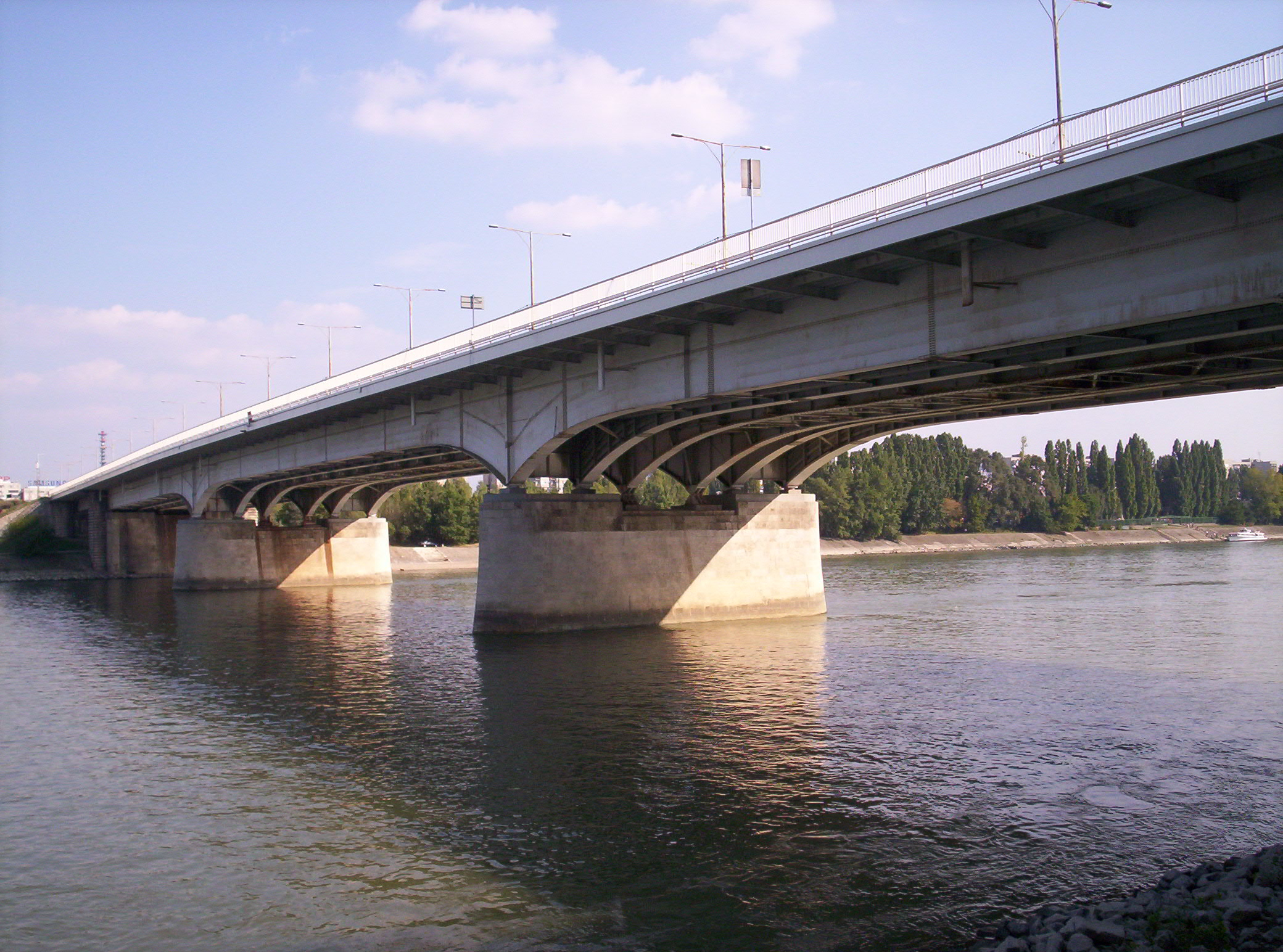
The Árpád Bridge

The Council of Public Works of Budapest drew up the first proposal for the settlement of the area in 1938, which also took into account the abolition of the railway station here. Between 1970 and 1976, the area along Párkány Street was redeveloped, and between 1982 and 1984, the first phase of the Vizafogó residential estate was built on the eastern side of the Budapest Metro, based on the designs of László Bene and Ferenc Szentmártoni. The ten-story buildings, constructed using the technology of a building factory, contained 2,684 apartments. In addition, a 16-room school, a 200-seat kindergarten, a 100-seat daycare and the present building of the Berzsenyi Dániel Gimnázium were built on the site, along with commercial units and a pharmacy. From 1987 onwards, the second phase was built on the site of the freight station, which was completed by 1989. The station building was renovated and is still standing today.

In the north-western part of the neighborhood is the Marina Beach, which began construction in the early 2000s. The 2017 World Aquatics Championships led to the construction of the Danube Arena in the Dagály Bath area, which was associated with the renewal of a large part of the Danube promenade in the district, which was named Moscow Promenade.

Before the Regime Change, the FOKA (River Regulation and Gravel Dredging Company) operated a plant around the artificial Danube bay between the Marina shore and the mouth of the Rákos stream. Today, it functions as a motorboat and small boat harbor.

In January 2021, a large park in Vizafogó near the Árpád Bridge was announced for construction. Construction officially began on June 21 of the same year, and was open to the public on March 8, 2022.
