= André Kostolany =

Hungarian-born French stock broker (1906–1999)

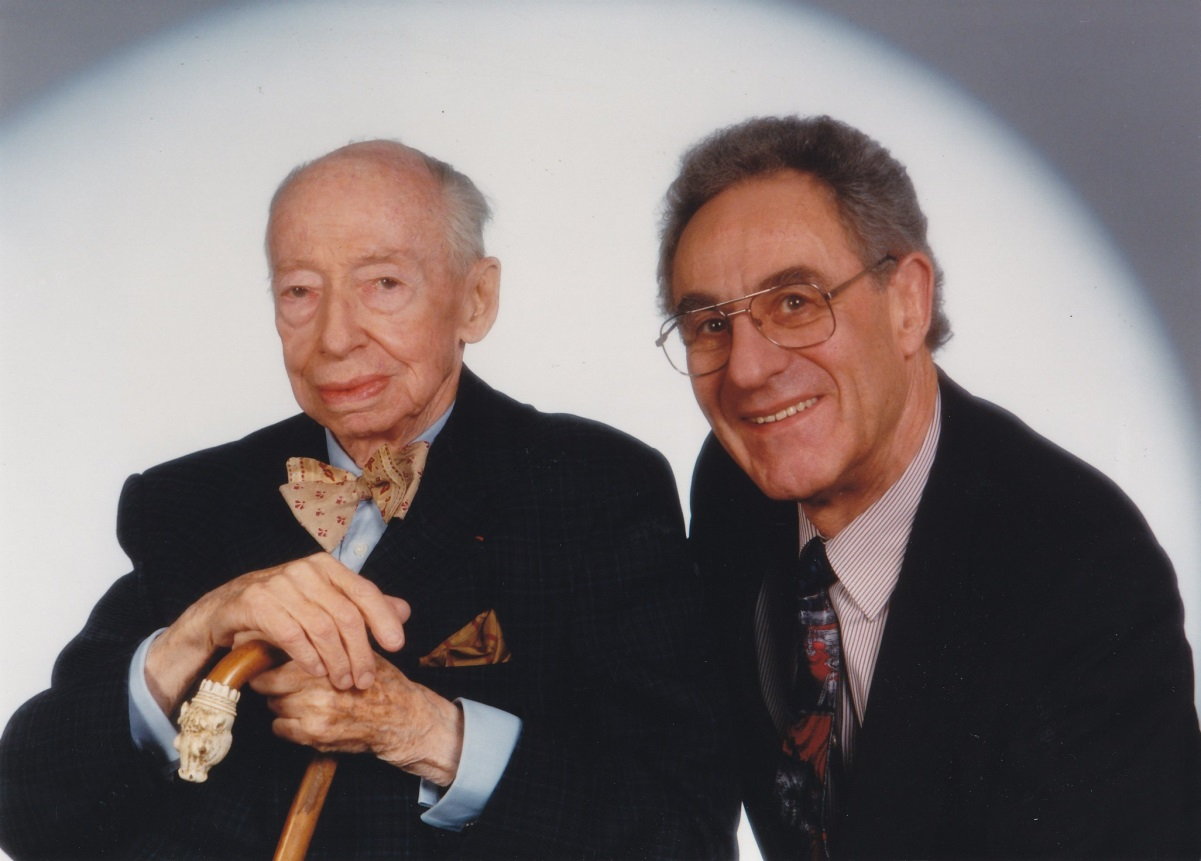
- André Kostolany (left) and Gottfried Heller (right) in 1997
- Born: 9 February 1906; Budapest, Austria-Hungary
- Died: 14 September 1999 (aged 93); Paris, France
- Occupation: Speculator

André Kostolany (February 9, 1906 – September 14, 1999) was a stock market expert, bon vivant and Chevalier de la Légion d'Honneur. He worked most of his life in France and Germany.

== Biography ==
Kostolany was born in Budapest, a Hungarian Roman Catholic of Jewish descent. He originally studied Philosophy and History of Art in Budapest but his father forced him to abandon his studies and sent him to Paris in 1924, to work as a stockbroker. There he began his career as a speculator and arbitrageur. He was able to make a profit during the decline in market prices which began at the end of 1929, having been bearish at the time.

When the Germans occupied France in 1940, he fled to New York. From 1941 to 1950, he was the general director and president of the G. Ballai and Co Financing Company. From 1950 he lived mainly in Paris, with an office in Munich and a vacation home on the Côte d’Azur.

After World War II, he invested heavily in the reconstruction of Germany. The subsequent economic boom helped him build up his fortune. In return, Kostolany spent most of his later life writing columns and holding seminars about the stock market in Germany, where he became famous as a stock market expert. His fame was founded in the vast amount of practical experience he had accumulated during his 70-year career, in different trades, in many markets around the world. He died in Paris at the age of 93.

== His beliefs ==
Kostolany, spurred by his successful investment in Germany after World War II, held a deep respect for “the inherent qualities and capabilities of the German people”, which, according to him, would consequently lead Germany to a new economic boom (see Wirtschaftswunder), after the German economy absorbed the shock of reunification.

Kostolany was a critic of the gold standard, the monetary system that fixes exchange rates to the price of gold, since he believed that whenever it was used, it suppressed economic growth and led to cyclical crises. Consequently, he was a very vocal critic of the monetary policy of the Bundesbank during the 1980s and 1990s.

== Published works ==
Kostolany published a lot of books in various languages, including 13 books that sold more than 3 million copies in total. He was for many years the author of a column in the monthly Capital, a stock market related magazine in Germany (he wrote a total of 414 articles).

Some of his works (in their original titles) are:

- Suez: Le roman d'une entreprise – French (1939)
- La paix du Dollar – French – Der Friede, den der Dollar bringt – German (1957)
- La Grande confrontation – French (1959)
- Si la bourse m'était contée – French (1960)
- L'aventure de l'argent – French (1973)
- … und was macht der Dollar? Im Irrgarten der Währungsspekulationen – German (1987)
- Kostolanys Börsenpsychologie – German (1991)
- Kostolanys Bilanz der Zukunft – German (1995)
- Weisheit eines Spekulanten – German (1996)
- Die Kunst über Geld nachzudenken – German (2000)
