= Gusztáv Rados =

Hungarian mathematician (b. 1862–1942)

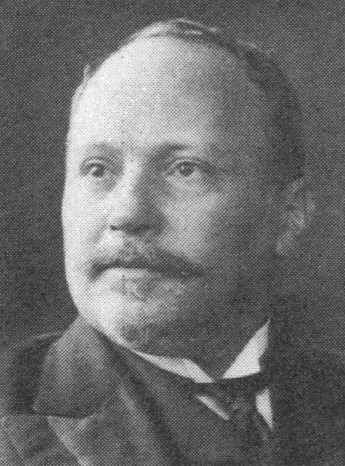
Gusztáv Rados

Gusztáv Rados (22 February 1862 – 1 November 1942) was a Hungarian mathematician. He specialized in number theory, linear algebra, algebra, and differential geometry. In 1936, he was awarded the Grand Prize of the Hungarian Academy of Sciences.

== Education and career ==
Rados was born on 22 February 1862 in Pest. He studied mathematics at the Budapest University of Technology and Economics (1879-1883). In 1884 and 1885 he studied under Felix Klein in Leipzig and in 1885 returned to the Technical University in Budapest, where he became a professor and was temporarily rector.

Along with Julius König, Gaston Darboux and Felix Klein he was on the committee that awarded the Bolyai Prize.

In 1907 he became a member of the Hungarian Academy of Sciences. He was a founding member of the Physical and Mathematical Society in Budapest, and in 1913 its vice president and in 1933 its president. In 1936 he was awarded the Grand Prize of the Hungarian Academy of Sciences.

He was an invited speaker at the International Congress of Mathematicians in Zürich in 1897 and in Rome in 1908.

He died on 1 November 1942 in Budapest.

== Works ==
- Zur Theorie der adjungirten Substitutionen. In: Mathematische Annalen. 48. Band (1897), pp. 417–424
- Zur Theorie der adjungierten quadratischen Formen. In: Verhandlungen des ersten internationalen Mathematiker-Kongresses in Zürich vom 9. bis 11. August 1897. Leipzig: B. G. Teubner, 1898, pp. 163–165
