= Cezaro Rossetti =

Scottish Esperanto writer

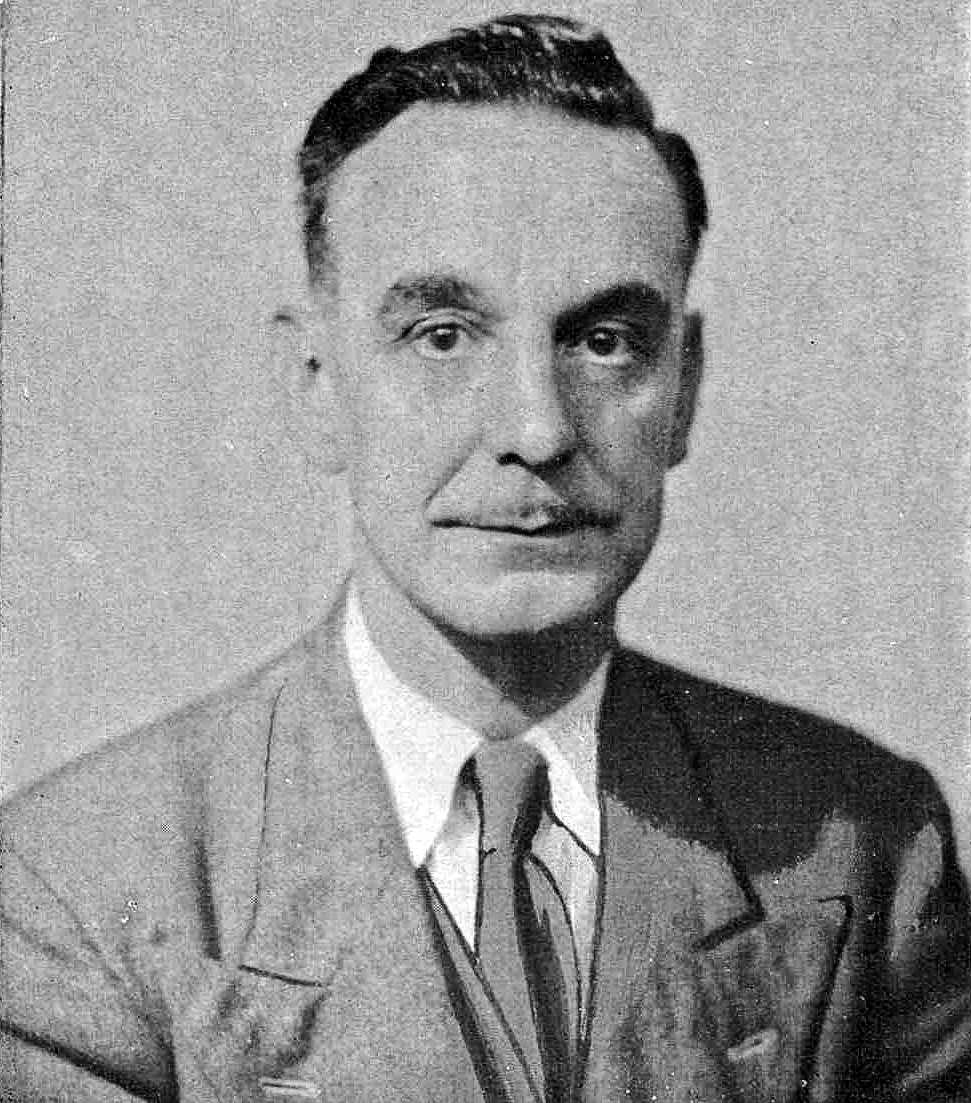
Portrait of Cezaro Rossetti

Cezaro Rossetti (1901 –8 May 1950) was a Scottish Esperanto writer.

Of Italian-Swiss derivation, he was born in Glasgow and lived in Britain. Together with his younger brother, Reto Rossetti, he learned Esperanto in 1928. He studied in Bombay as a restaurant manager, worked as a cook, briefly as a peddler, and afterwards as a hawker at fairs.

Cezaro Rossetti's novel Kredu min, sinjorino! (Believe me, Ma'am!), written at his brother's instigation and reflecting in part his own life experiences, has been translated into Hungarian, Japanese, Polish, and English. In 2013, the Milan Esperanto Club prepared a translation into Italian, which was then published by the Italian Esperanto Federation.
