= György Sárközi =

Hungarian writer

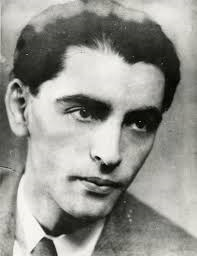
György Sárközi

György Sárközi (1899–1945) was a Hungarian poet, translator and writer, and contributor to the literary review Nyugat, then to the journals Pandora (1927), Válasz (1935–1938) and Kélet Népe (1939). As he was Jewish, in 1944 he was deported to the work camp of Balf and died there.
