= OMIKE =

Hungarian Jewish cultural association (1910–1944)

OMIKE, the Hungarian Jewish Educational Association (Hungarian: "Országos Magyar Izraelita Közművelődési Egyesület") was a Jewish cultural association that existed from 1910 to 1944.

== History ==
=== Beginning ===
OMIKE was founded in 1910 by Budapest chief rabbi, Simon Hevesi, with the purpose to maintain the traditional values of Judaism for people living in secular society. The association set up several cultural and welfare institution, e.g. kitchen for out of town students, library lodging for Jewish industry and trade students, summer camps. Lectures were organized. After the Anti-Jewish Laws from 1938 onwards, actors, singers, artists, and writers who could not work under the anti-semitic restrictions received assistance and protection.

=== Artist Action ===
From 1938 limits were placed on Jewish actors performing in theatres and cinema. The Budapest Opera suggested the possibility of acting in the Goldmark Hall of the Jewish Community. Dr. Géza Ribáry succeeded in obtaining the permission needed for performances, without advertising and with only Jewish audiences, leading to the formation of OMIKE Artist Action (Művészakció) in September 1938.

=== Program ===
The opening performance occurred on January 8, 1940 with Moses by Imre Madách. Oszkár Beregi played the principal role. Other shows were:

- May 4, 1940: Pergolesi: La Serva padrona
- December 7, 1940: Wolff-Ferrari: Susanne's secret
- January 27, 1941: Mozart: Entführung aus dem Serail
- November 4, 1941: Szomory Dezső: Takáts Alice
- December 21, 1941: Donáth Ede: Szulamit
- May 15, 1942: Mozart: Bastien et Bastienne
- December 16, 1942: Kodály evening, with the composer present
- March 22, 1943: Racine: Eszter

The last event took place on March 19, 1944, when during the dress rehearsal of a Molière comedy in Szeged German soldier marched in and shut the theater for any further performances. This ended the four years of activity of OMIKE.

=== Celebration ===
A “Remény”, Jewish social and cultural periodical remembered OMIKE in 1998 on the occasion of the 65. Anniversary.

== Persons ==
=== Management ===
- László Bánóczi, director of the Artist Action
- Oszkár Beregi (1876, Budapest – 1965 Hollywood), actor, director, during the years 1940–1944 principal director of OMIKE Artist Action. In 1944 went into hiding assisted by his brother-in-law, Pataky Kálmán, world famous singer.
- László Weiner (1916 Szombathely – 1944 Luvov), composer, pianist, conductor. Studied at the Academy with Kodály. In 1942 married Vera Rózsa. In 1943 was taken to a camp where he was killed. Not even Kodály could save him.

=== Singers ===
- Vera Rózsa (1921– ), studied at the academy as conductor and later as singer. Her first appearance happened in 1943 at OMIKE. She sang in Handel’s Judas Maccabaeus and Cherubino in Mozart’s Nozze di Figaro. In the Swedish Embassy found refuge during the persecution but lost her husband. After the liberation sand at the Budapest Opera and Vienna State Opera.
- Gabriella Relle (1902, Budapest – 1975), 1924–29 soloist at Budapest Opera, in the thirties appeared in Berlin Staatsoper; sang over 40 roles.
- Manc Herendi (1930 Budapest – ), actress; after the war had principal roles in different cities in Hungary.
- Dezső Ernster (1898, Pécs – 1981, Zürich), bass opera singer; had great success in Germany. Upon arrival of the Nazis returned to Hungary. Sang on several occasions at OMIKE. In 1944 was taken to a camp, but was liberated. After the war sang in Budapest and several major theatres abroad.
- Moshe Schwimmer (1918, Ukraine 2003), cantor; studied in Brno and sang in the choir of the Conservatory. Upon arrival of Nazis escaped to Budapest. Continued studying and participated in the OMIKE organization. Gave concerts until taken to laber camp. After the liberation appeared in Europe and then went to Chicago where he Served as Cantor at Temple Ezra for 30 years.
- Béla Lénárd (1892, Vienna – 1960, Budapest), actor; in the twenties founder and secretary of a comedies and cabaret theatres. During 1940–44 played and gave conferences at OMIKE. After the war he continued his theatrical career.

=== Painters ===
- Imre Ámos Ungár (1907, Nagykálló – 1943, Ohrdruf), graphic artist; in the forced labor camp created drawings that were shown in OMIKE. Later was again arrested and taken to Ukraine. Even there continued to draw and wrote poems. In 1943, the Germans forced him to proceed West. During this march he died at not exactly known place.
- Ilka Gedő (1921, Budapest -1985), painter and graphic artist; in 1940 participated at the OMIKE second art show and in 1943 the fifth art show. Her works include drawings in the ghetto.
- Viktor Erdei (1879, Budapest - 1945, Budapest), painter and graphic artist; from 1939, his drawings appeared at the OMIKE exhibitions, the last time in March 1944.
- Ervin Marton (1912-1968), photographer
- Éva Balla-Falus (1913-1966), movie director
- Anna Sichermann-Margit (1913-1991), painter

=== Writers ===
OMIKE program included classic works and pieces written by Jewish writers whose works could not be performed.

- Bálint Lajos: Támár (1942)
- Károly Pap (1897 Sopron – 1945 Bergen-Belsen): Batséba (1940) és Mózes (1942)
- Dezső Szomory (1869, Budapest – 1944 Budapest)
- Ernő Szép (1884, Huszt – 1953 Budapest)
- Ferenc Molnár (1878, Budapest – 1952, New York)
- Bródy Sándor

== Souvenir ==
- OMIKE concert program May 1943 and September 1947
- 2004 évben nagy árverés volt Budapesten V. Szt. István krt. 11. (Auction in 2004)

== Literature ==
- Horák Magda (szerk.) "With ancient faith and honor for the homeland" OMIKE: National Hungarian Jewish Public Civilization Association, assorted documents: 1909–1944
- Hasznos Judit – Garics Erika: Száz éves az OMIKE 1998 Remény Folyóírság 2009 tavaszi számja
- Füzesi R.: Színház az árnyékban (1991)
- "Ősi hittel, becsülettel a hazáért" OMIKE
