= William Auld =

Scottish poet and translator (1924–2006)

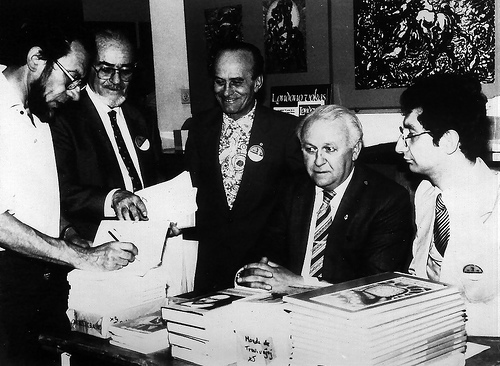
- Writers in Antwerp in 1982. From left: Georges Lagrange, Tibor Sekelj, Aldo de 'Giorgi, William Auld and publisher Brucjo Casini.
- Born: 6 November 1924; Erith, England
- Died: 11 September 2006 (aged 81); Dollar, Scotland
- Occupations: Poet, writer, translator, esperantist, essayist, musician, editor
- Writing career
- Language: Esperanto, English

William Auld (6 November 1924 – 11 September 2006) was a British poet, author, translator and magazine editor who wrote chiefly in Esperanto.

== Life ==
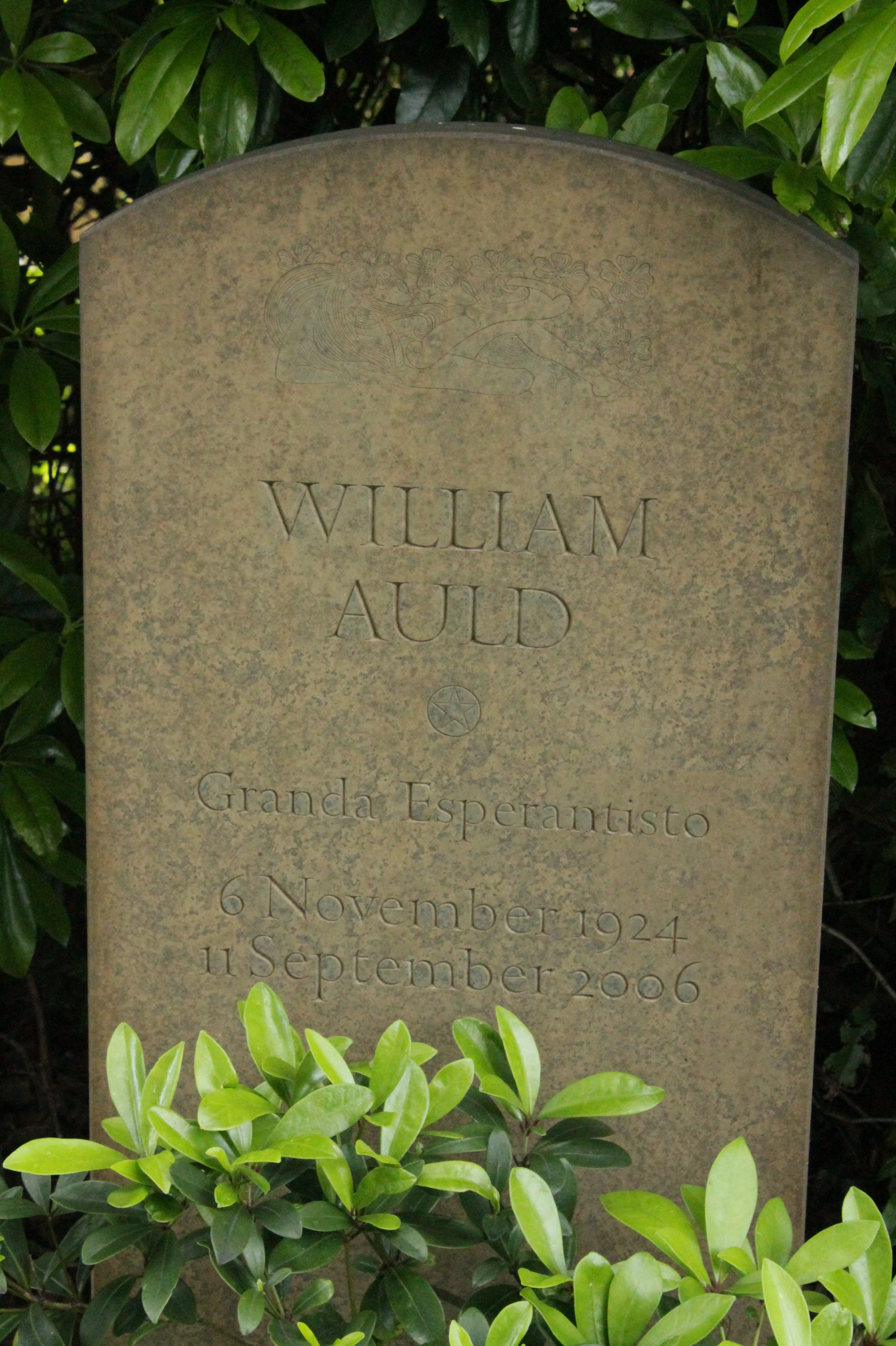
Auld's grave in Dollair churchyard

Auld was born at Erith in Kent, and then moved to Glasgow with his parents, attending Allan Glen's School. After wartime service as a spitfire pilot in the Royal Air Force, he studied English literature at Glasgow University, and then qualified as a teacher.

In 1952 he married his childhood sweetheart Margaret (Meta) Barr Stewart, also an Esperantist, and had two children. In 1960, he was appointed to a secondary school in Alloa and he remained there for the rest of his life. He was nominated for the Nobel Prize in Literature in 1999, 2004, and 2006, making him the first person nominated for works in Esperanto.

His masterpiece, La infana raso (The Infant Race), is a long poem that, in Auld's words, explores "the role of the human race in time and in the cosmos," and is partly based on The Cantos by Ezra Pound.

Auld began to learn Esperanto in 1937 but only became active in the propagation of the language in 1947, and from then on wrote many works in Esperanto. He edited various magazines and reviews, including Esperanto en Skotlando (1949–1955), Esperanto (1955–1958, 1961–1962), Monda Kulturo (1962–1963), Norda Prismo (1968–1972), La Brita Esperantisto (1973–1999) and Fonto (1980–1987).

He was Vice President of the Universal Esperanto Association (1977–1980), President of the Academy of Esperanto (1979–1983), and President of the Esperanto PEN Centre (1999–2005). He donated his personal collection of nearly 5,000 books in and about Esperanto to the National Library of Scotland, where it is now housed, in 2001.

He died in Dolair/Dollar, Clackmannanshire, and is buried in Dollar churchyard. The grave lies on the approach path to the church from the main road.

== List of works ==
=== Collected poetry ===
- Spiro de l' pasio (in Kvaropo, 1952)
- La infana raso (1956)
- Unufingraj melodioj (1960)
- Humoroj (1969)
- Rimleteroj (with Marjorie Boulton, 1976)
- El unu verda vivo (1978)
- En barko senpilota (Edistudio, 1987)
- Unu el ni (1992)

=== Anthologies ===
- Angla antologio 1000–1800 (poetry editor, 1957)
- Esperanta antologio (1958/1984)
- 25 jaroj (poetry editor, 1977)
- Skota antologio (associate editor, 1978)
- Sub signo de socia muzo (1987)
- Nova Esperanta Krestomatio (1991)
- Plena poemaro: Miĥalski (ed. 1994)
- Tempo fuĝas (1996)

=== Translations from English ===
- La balenodento, by Jack London (1952)
- Epifanio, by Shakespeare (1977)
- La urbo de terura nokto, by James Thomson (1977)
- Don Johano, Kanto 1, by Lord Byron (1979)
- La robaioj de Omar Kajam, by Edward Fitzgerald (1980)
- La sonetoj, de Shakespeare (Edistudio, 1981)
- Fenikso tro ofta, by Christopher Fry (1984)
- Montara vilaĝo, by Chun-chan Je (1984)
- La graveco de la Fideliĝo, by Oscar Wilde (1987)
- La komedio de eraroj, by Shakespeare (with Asen M. Simeonov, 1987)
- Omaĝoj. Poemtradukoj (1987)
- Gazaloj, by Hafiz (1988)
- Spartako, by Leslie Mitchell (1993)
- La stratoj de Aŝkelono, by Harry Harrison (1994)
- Teri-strato, by Douglas Dunn (1995)
- La kunularo de l' ringo, by J. R. R. Tolkien (1995)
- La du turegoj, by J. R. R. Tolkien (1995)
- La reveno de la reĝo, by J. R. R. Tolkien (1997)
- La hobito, by J. R. R. Tolkien (poems and songs; with Christopher Gledhill, 2000)
- La Hobito, aŭ Tien kaj Reen, by J. R. R. Tolkien (poems and songs; with Christopher Gledhill, Evertype 2015, ISBN 9781782011101, ISBN 9781782011095)
- Kantoj, poemoj kaj satiroj, by Robert Burns (with Reto Rossetti, 1977)
- Jurgen, by James Branch Cabell (2001)

=== Translations ===
- Aniaro, by Harry Martinson (from Swedish with Bertil Nilsson, 1979)
- Julia on Pandataria

=== Song collections ===
- Floroj sen kompar' (with Margaret Hill, 1973), British folksongs translated into Esperanto
- Kantanta mia bird' (with Margaret Hill, 1973), British folksongs translated into Esperanto
- Dum la noktoj (with Margaret and David Hill, 1976), original songs

=== Textbooks ===
- Esperanto: A New Approach; (1965)
- Paŝoj al plena posedo (1968)
- A first course in Esperanto (1972)
- Traduku! (1993)

=== Bibliographies ===
Bibliografio de tradukoj el la angla lingvo (with E. Grimley Evans, 1996)

=== Essay collections ===
- Facetoj de Esperanto (1976)
- Pri lingvo kaj aliaj artoj (1978)
- Enkonduko en la originalan literaturon de Esperanto (1979)
- Vereco, distro, stilo (1981)
- Kulturo kaj internacia lingvo (1986)
- La fenomeno Esperanto (1988)
- La skota lingvo, hodiaŭ kaj hieraŭ (1988)

=== Miscellaneous literature ===
Pajleroj kaj stoploj: elektitaj prozaĵoj (1997)
