= Frigyes Karinthy =

Hungarian writer (1887–1938)

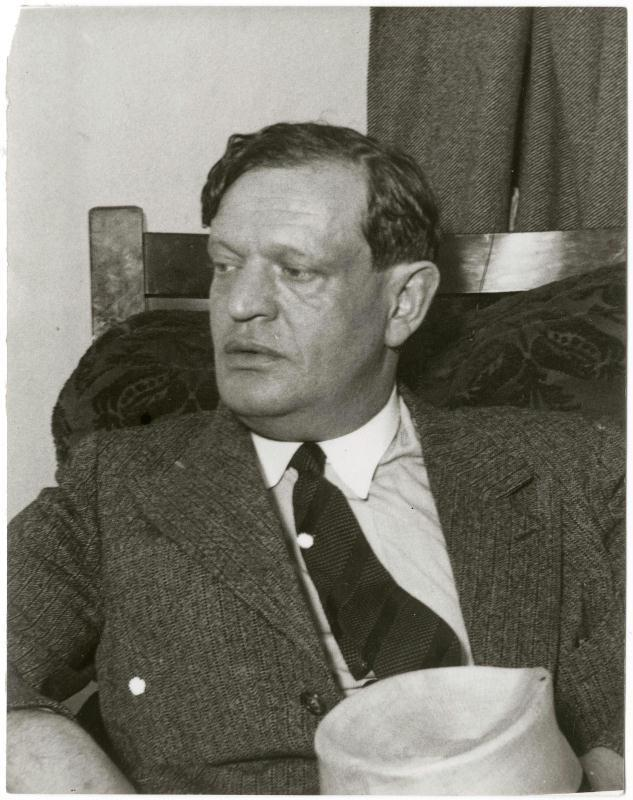
- Karinthy, c. 1930
- Born: 25 June 1887; Budapest, Austria-Hungary
- Died: 29 August 1938 (aged 51); Siófok, Hungary
- Occupations: Author, playwright, poet, journalist, and translator
- Known for: Originating the six degrees of separation concept

Frigyes Karinthy (Hungarian: [ˈfriɟɛʃ ˈkɒrinti]; 25 June 1887 – 29 August 1938) was a Hungarian author, playwright, poet, journalist, and translator. He was the first proponent of the six degrees of separation concept, in his 1929 short story, Chains (Láncszemek). Karinthy remains one of the most popular Hungarian writers. He was the brother of artist Ada Karinthy and the father of poet Gábor Karinthy and writer Ferenc Karinthy.

Among the English translations of Karinthy's works are two science fiction novellas that continue the adventures of Swift's character Gulliver. Voyage to Faremido is an early examination of artificial intelligence, with a pacifist theme, while Capillaria is a polished and darkly humorous satire on the 'battle of the sexes'.

== Life and work ==
Karinthy was born into a bourgeois family in Budapest. His family was originally Jewish but converted to Lutheranism shortly before he was born. He started his writing career as a journalist and remained a writer of short, humorous blurbs until his death. He rose to instant fame in 1912 with the publication of his literary parodies called Here's How YOU Write (Így írtok ti) in which he parodied the style of his fellow authors. He expanded the collection continuously during the following years. Among his early works, his collection of short stories from school life, Please Sir! (Tanár úr, kérem, 1916) also stands out for its grasp of the trials and tribulations of the average schoolboy. Karinthy was an admirer of H. G. Wells. In addition to translating Wells' The Country of the Blind and The Sea Lady into Hungarian, Karinthy's own fiction was influenced by Wells. Another popular highlight is his translation of A. A. Milne's Winnie the Pooh, that made it a cult book in Hungary. His translations are actually collaborations with her sister, Emilia. Frigyes didn't speak any languages besides Hungarian while Emilia spoke about 15-20 and she created raw translations which Frigyes rewrote according to the grandson of Frigyes. Emilia suffered from severe mental health problems and most people wasn't even aware of her existence and there are no known photos of her. Her diminutive name was Mici which can be found in the Hungarian title of Winnie the Pooh: Micimackó.

From World War I, his writing became more serious and engaged, though never leaving a satirical bent. Karinthy cited Jonathan Swift as a major influence: from this arose the novel Voyage to Faremido (Utazás Faremidóba, 1916) and its sequel, Capillaria (1921). Many of his novels and stories also deal with the difficulties of relationships between men and women, partly due to his unhappy second marriage.

Karinthy had a brain tumor for which he was operated upon in Stockholm in 1936 by Herbert Olivecrona. He describes this experience in his autobiographical novel, Journey Round my Skull, (Utazás a koponyám körül), originally published in 1939; a reissue appeared in the Corvina Hungarian Classics series (Corvina Books, 1992) and then as a NYRB Classic in 2008 with an introduction by neurologist Oliver Sacks. He died two years after the operation, during a holiday at Lake Balaton after a quarrel with his wife.

== Private life ==
Karinthy was married twice. He married the actress Etel Judik in 1913. The marriage was serene and happy and they had a son called Gábor. Tragically, Etel died very young during the Spanish flu pandemic in 1918. In 1920, he married the psychiatrist Aranka Böhm, with whom he had another son, the writer Ferenc Karinthy. Although he did not speak the language, Karinthy was an ardent supporter of Esperanto, attending Esperanto congresses, and even became president of the Hungarian Esperanto Society in 1932.

He is well known for his dry sense of humor, as he himself noted: "In humor I know no jokes." Just one example of it was his advertising slogan for his book Journey Round my Skull: The Newest Novel of the Famed Tumorist.

== Selected filmography ==
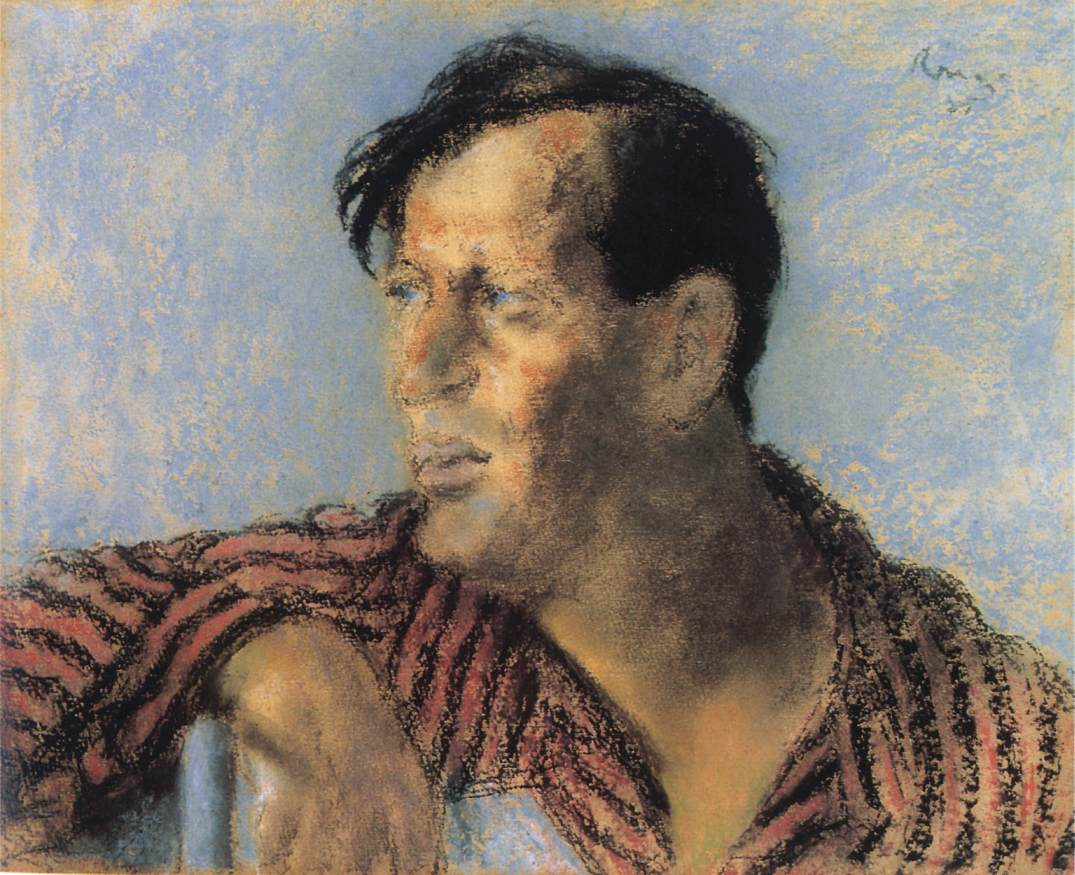
Portrait by József Rippl-Rónai

- The Stork Caliph (1917) – Karinthy was the scriptwriter for this film by Alexander Korda, based on a novel by Mihály Babits.

=== Works in English translation ===
- Drama: A Farce-Satire in One Act (1925)
- Refund : a farce in one act adapted, from the Hungarian, by Percival Wilde.
- A Journey Round My Skull (1939) translated from the Hungarian by Vernon Duckworth Barker.
- Voyage to Faremido & Capillaria (1966) Introduced and translated by Paul Tabori.
- Please Sir! (1968) Translated by István Farkas. The foreword translated by Mary Kuttna.
- Grave and gay : selections from his work (1973) Frigyes Karinthy; selected by István Kerékgyártó; afterword by Károly Szalay.
