= Mark Zamenhof =

Father of L. L. Zamenhof (1837–1907)

Marek Zamenhof
- מוטל (מרדכי) זמנהוף (Motl (Mordecai) Zamenhof)
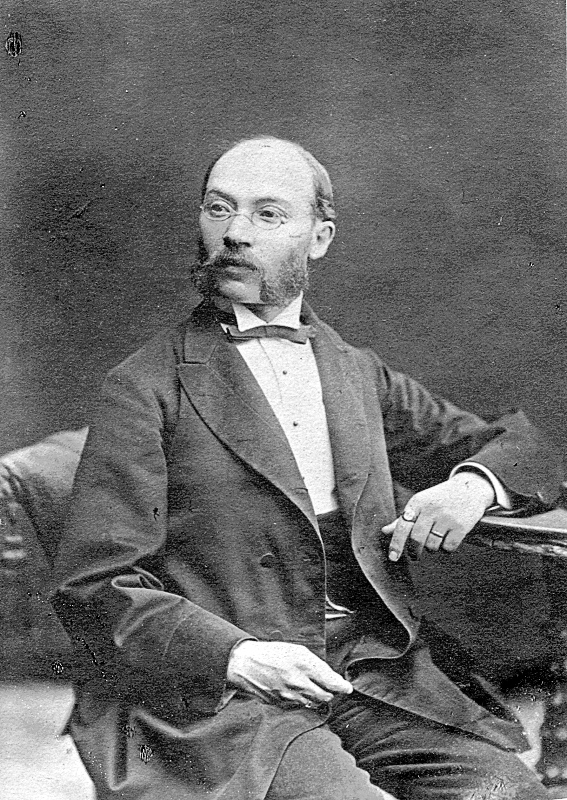
- Marek Zamenhof, 1878
- Born: Markus Fabianovich Zamenhof; 27 January 1837; Suwałki, Congress Poland, Russian Empire
- Died: 29 November 1907 (aged 70); Warsaw, Congress Poland, Russian Empire
- Spouse: Rozalia Zamenhof
- Children: L. L. Zamenhof; Felix Zamenhof; Aleksander Zamenhof; Leon Zamenhof; Henryk Zamenhof; Ida Zamenhof; Augusta Hermelin; Sora Dwora Zamenhof; Hersz Zamenhof; Fejgla Zamenhof; Mina Zamenhof
- Father: Fabian Zamenhof

Marek Zamenhof (born Markus Fabianovich Zamenhof, 27 January 1837 - 29 November 1907) was the son of Fabian Zamenhof and father of L. L. Zamenhof. He was a teacher of languages, teaching both French and German. He was a Knight of many orders.

Mordka Zamenhof officially changed his name to Marek and postmortem the name of his father Fajwel to Fabian,on 20 April 1871.

== Professional life ==
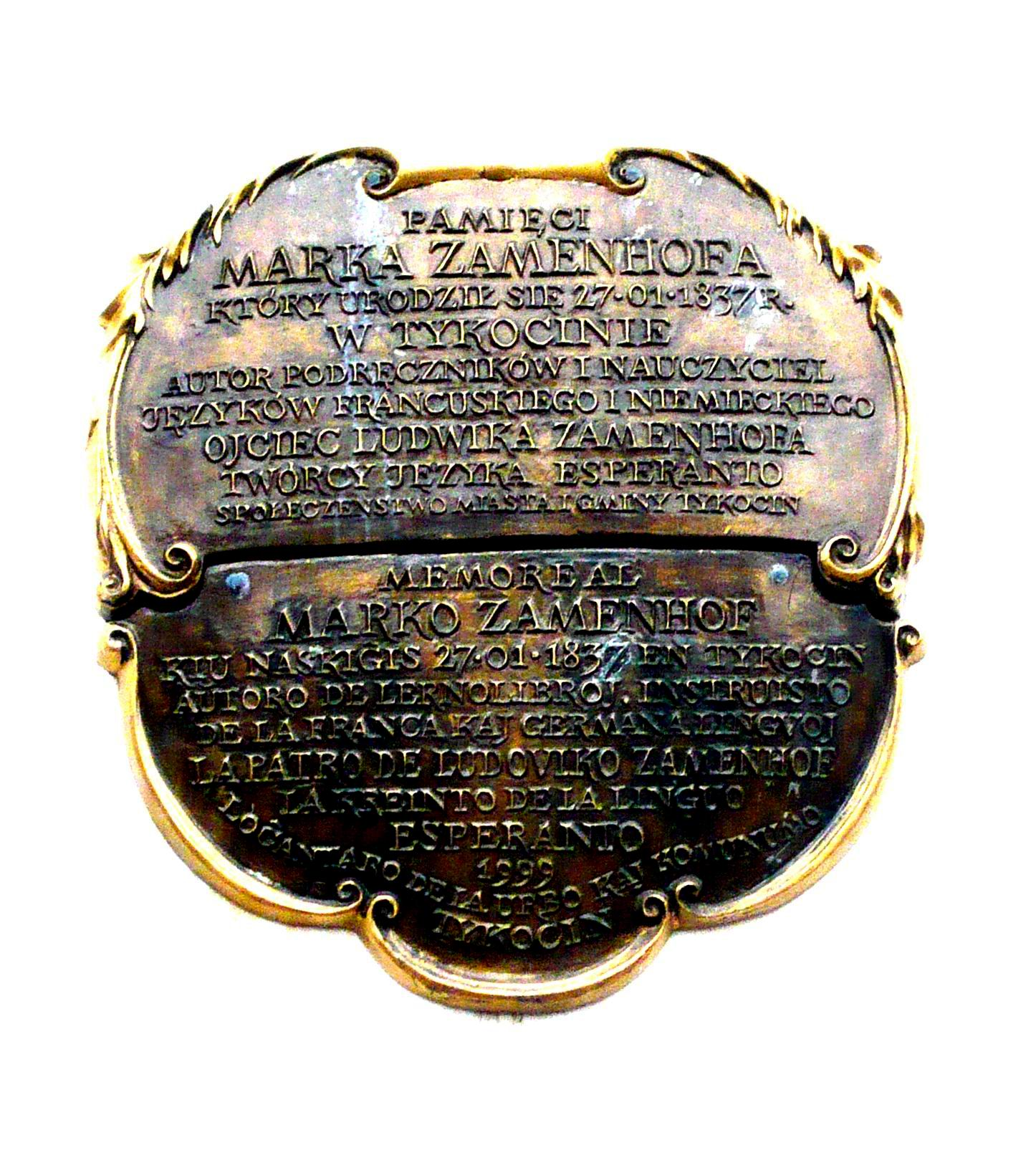
Plaque to Marek Zamenhof in Tykocin, his hometown in Polish : Pamięci Marka Zamenhofa Który urodził się 27•01•1837r w Tykocinie Autor podręczników i nauczyciel języków francuskiego i niemieckiego Ojciec Ludwika Zamenhofa twórcy języka Esperanto Społeczenstwo miasta i gminy Tykocin (in Esperanto) Memore to Mark Zamenhof that was born 27•01•1837 in Tykocin Author of textbooks. Teacher of French and German languages. The father of Ludovic Zamenhof the creator of the linguo (like this!) Esperanto 1999 Population of the city and community Tykocin

Some facts from Zamenhof's life are known only from documents of the State Archive of History of Belarus in Grodno.

In the spring of 1862 Marek Zamenhof declared his profession as an accountant. The reference about him as teacher appears later in the same year.

There is a note in the documents of the Russian secret service about Zamenhof that describes denunciation letters to the Tsar's officers. One anonymous denunciation concerned the arrival in Białystok of a Hebrew teacher from Warsaw, Bernard Wildenbaum, who was charged due to usage of Polish national dresses. The police in the investigation suspected that the anonymous letter was written by Zamenhof, because he led that time a school for girls and had previously written various denunciation letters.

At that time Zamenhof was a co-owner of a school for Jewish girls. In 1866 it had 63 pupils enrolled. Several Polish biographers write that Mark Zamenhof was a teacher of the Białystok high school (technical school). If he taught in that high school, probably that was only a short episode after many Polish teachers were dismissed in reprisal after the January Uprising of 1864.

By 1874 the Zamenhof family emigrated to Warsaw, where Zamenhof advanced as a teacher of the German language in the Veterinary Institute and in the technical school, one of three Jews that were employed in the Warsaw state schools. Later he became state censor for texts written in Hebrew and Yiddish.

According to Z. Weinstein, Marek Zamenhof was a secret adviser. Probably Weinstein erred, because the secret adviser was very high, third rank in the officiant ranks, that matched to the rank of general in the army. Zamenhof probably had the 9th rank "title adviser" that matches to the officer rank in Polish army.

Zamenhof reported about the censorship of the Jewish newspaper Ha-Tsfira. When in 1888 he allowed in the newspaper an article about wine-testing, Hayyim Selig Slonimski reported on Zamenhof's censorship. Ha-Tsfira said that the censor Zamenhof was very strict and severe in the execution of his duties.

The censorship "mistake" of Zamenhof was presented as important cause of the financial problems of the family that prompted his migration to Grodno in October 1893. But that happened 5 years after the penalty of Zamenhof. It seems that the reasons of the financial problems of the family were a bit more complex. In the 1890s three of his sons started their costly university education: Fabian — pharmacology, Grzegorz (Henryk) and Leon — medicine. Funds were probably also required for Gitla's dowry.

== Marek and Esperanto ==
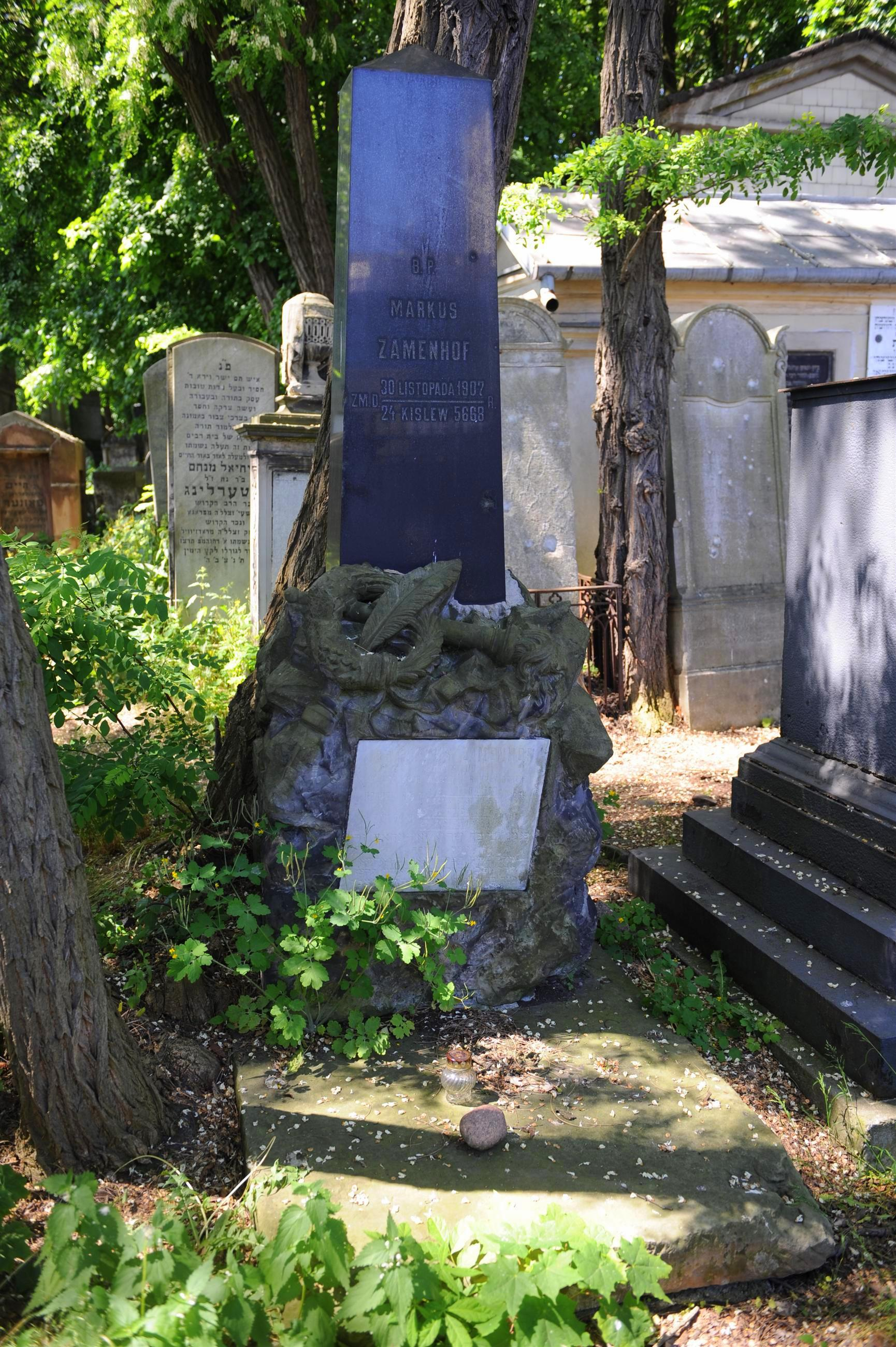
Grave of Marek Zamenhof at the Jewish Cemetery in Warsaw

His son L. L. Zamenhof, when he started his university studies in 1879, handed over his Esperanto language work to Marek Zamenhof to preserve it until he finished his studies. But Marek, not understanding the ideas of his son and reckoning the draft be a silly work, burned the book. After many years he became convinced of the value of Esperanto, and asked that his son L. L. Zamenhof translate his book Frazeologia (Russian-Polish-French-German Phraseology) to Esperanto; the Proverbaro Esperanta arose from this endeavor.
