= Proverbaro Esperanta =

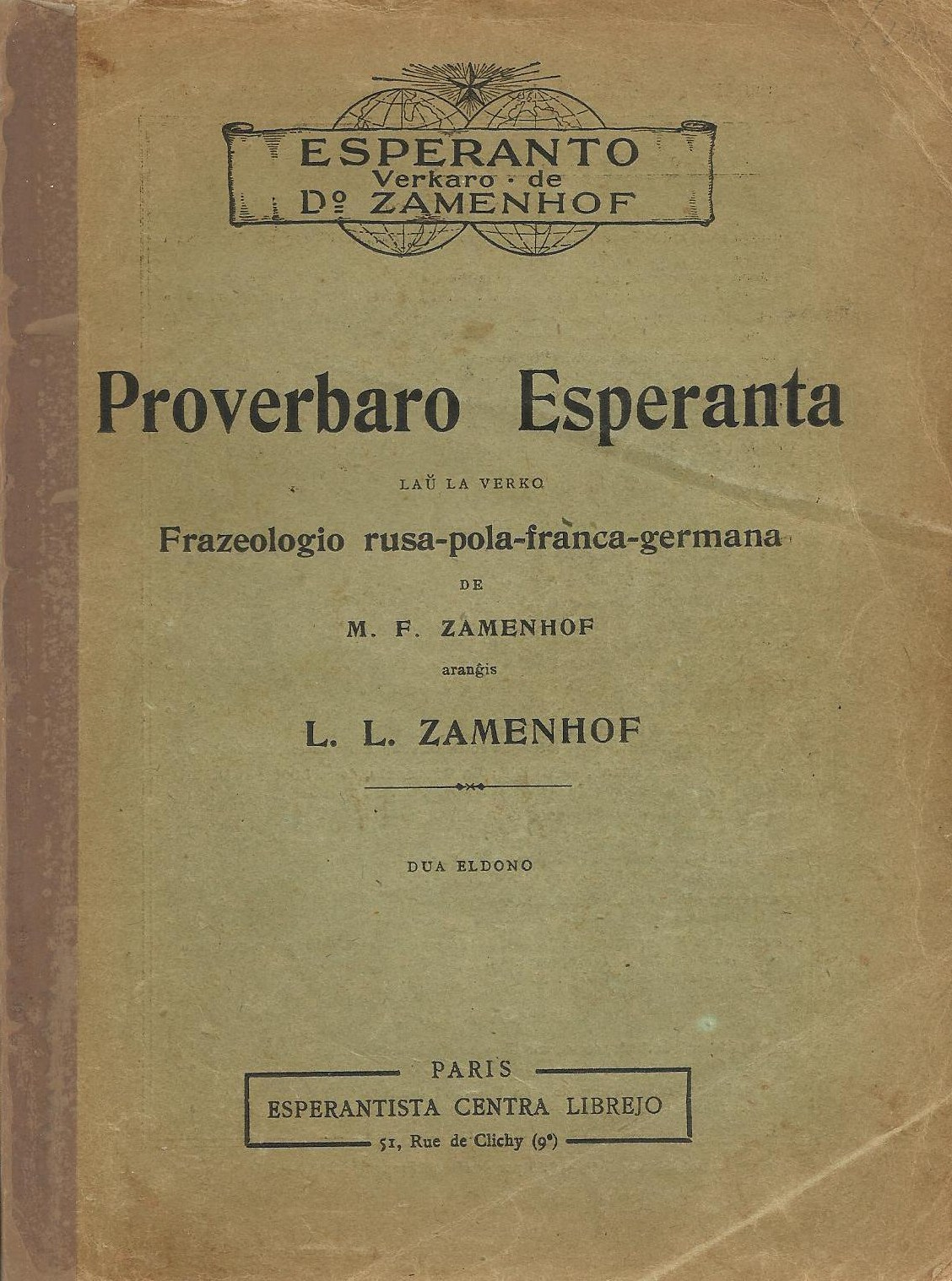
Frontpage of the Proverbaro Esperanta; publisher Esperantista Centra Librejo, 1925.

Proverbaro Esperanta ("Esperanto Proverbs") is a book of proverbs in Esperanto. It was arranged by L. L. Zamenhof according to a book of his father Mark Zamenhof (Frazeologio Russian-Polish-French-German). It contains 2630 proverbs.
