= Esperanto etymology =

Origin of words in Esperanto

Esperanto vocabulary and grammatical forms derive primarily from the Romance languages, with substantial contributions from Germanic languages. The language occupies a middle ground between "naturalistic" a posteriori constructed languages such as Interlingua, which borrow words en masse from their source languages with little internal derivation, and a priori conlangs such as Solresol, in which the words have no historical connection to other languages. In Esperanto, root words are borrowed and retain much of the form of their source language, whether the phonetic form (eks- from international ex-, ŝvebi from German schweben, vualo from French voile) or orthographic form (teamo and boato from English team and boat, soifo from French soif). However, each root can then form dozens of derivations which may bear little resemblance to equivalent words in the source languages, such as registaro (government), which is derived from the Latinate root reg (to rule) but has a morphology closer to German or Russian.

== Source languages ==
Zamenhof took most of his Esperanto root words from languages of the Italic and Germanic families, principally Italian, French, German, Yiddish, and English. A large number are what might be called common European international vocabulary, or generic Romance: Roots common to several languages, such as vir- "man", found in English words such as virile, and okul- "eye", found in oculist. Some appear to be compromises between the primary languages, such as tondri (to thunder), per French tonner, Italian tuonare, German donnern and English thunder.

=== Romance and Germanic ===
The main languages contributing to Zamenhof's original vocabulary were French, English, and German/Yiddish, the modern languages most widely learned in schools around the world at the time Esperanto was devised. The result was that about two-thirds of this original vocabulary is Romance, and about one-third Germanic, including a pair of roots from Swedish:

Comparative the ju ... des ... (as in "the more the merrier"), from Swedish ju ... desto .... (Cf. German je ... desto ....)

A couple of words, strato (street) and gisto (yeast), are closer to Dutch (straat, gist) than German (Straße [ʃtrasə], Gest), but this may be a compromise between German and English the way ŝtono (stone) is a compromise between German Stein [ʃtajn] and English stone. (There's also ronki (to snore), Dutch ronken.) Fajro (fire) matches the pronunciation of English fire, but is also spelled and pronounced as Yiddish פֿײַר fajr. Indeed, much of the supposedly German vocabulary actually appears to be Yiddish, specifically Zamenhof's native Bialystok (Northeastern) dialect, which had formed the basis of his abortive attempt to standardize that language. Words with the digraph ei in German may in Esperanto have either ej (seemingly corresponding to the spelling) or aj (seemingly corresponding to the pronunciation). This pattern is not random, but reflects ei and ī in Old High German, a distinction preserved in Yiddish: hejmo (home: German Heim [hajm] but Yiddish הײם hejm), fajfi (whistle: both German pfeifen [p͜fajfən] and Yiddish פֿײַפֿן fajfn). Zamenhof never admitted to a Yiddish influence in Esperanto, presumably to avoid arousing antisemitic prejudice.

Many of the Latinate roots were given an Italianesque appearance, corresponding to the use of Italian as a model for Esperanto pronunciation, but in form are closer to French, such as ĉemizo (shirt: French chemise [ʃəmiz], Italian camicia [kamit͡ʃa]) and ĉevalo (horse: French cheval [ʃəval], Italian cavallo [kavallo]), though some forms are of Italian origin or are compromises between Italian and French, English, or both.

Since Zamenhof's day, a large amount of Latinate vocabulary has been added to the language. In 1987, Mattos calculated that 84% of basic vocabulary was Latinate, 14% Germanic, and 2% Slavic or Greek.

=== Latin and Greek ===
Only a few roots were taken directly from the classical languages:

Latin: sed (but), tamen (however), post (after), kvankam (although), kvazaŭ (as though), dum (during), nek (nor), aŭ (or), hodiaŭ (today), abio (fir), ardeo (heron), iri (to go—though this form survives in the future tense in French ira), prujno (frost), the adverbial suffix -e, and perhaps the inherent vowels of the past and present tenses, -i- and -a-. Many lexical affixes are common to several languages and thus may not have a clear source, but some such as -inda (worthy of), -ulo (a person), -um- (undefined), and -op- (a number together) may be Latin (e.g. the Latin gerundive -end-, the neuter inflection -um).

Classical Greek: kaj (and, from καί kai), pri (about, from περί perí), the plural suffix -j, the accusative case suffix -n, the inceptive prefix ek- (from ἐκ ek), and perhaps the jussive mood suffix -u (if that is not Hebrew).

Latin and Greek: the suffix -ido (offspring; from Latin -idēs and Greek -ίδης -ídēs).

As in the examples of ardeo 'heron' and abio 'fir' above, the names of most plants and animals are based on their binomial nomenclature, and so many are Latin or Greek as well.

=== Slavic and Lithuanian ===
Surprisingly few roots appear to have come from other modern European languages, even those Zamenhof was most familiar with. What follows is a fairly comprehensive list of such roots that do not also occur in principal languages:

Russian: barakti (to flounder, from барахтаться barahtatʹsja), gladi (to iron, from гладить gladitʹ), kartavi (to pronounce a guttural R, from картавить kartavitʹ), deĵori (to be on duty, from дежурить dezhyritʹ), kolbaso (a sausage, from колбаса kolbasa), krom (except, from кроме krome), kruta (steep, from крутой krutoj), nepre (without fail, from непременно nepremenno), vosto (a tail, from хвост hvost), the pet-name suffixes -ĉjo and -njo (from -чка -čka and -нька -nʹka), the augmentative suffix -eg- (from -яга -jaga), and perhaps the collective suffix -aro, if this is not from Latin.

Polish: barĉo (borscht, from barszcz), ĉu (whether, from czy, perhaps also Yiddish tsu), eĉ (even, from jeszcze), krado (a grating, from krata), luti (to solder, from lutować), [via] moŝto ([your] highness, from mość), ol (than, possibly from od by analogy with al), pilko (a ball, from piłka), ŝelko (suspenders, from szelki).

Russian or Polish: bulko (a bread roll, from bułka / булка bulka), celo (an aim, goal, from cel / цѣль tselʹ, cognates of German Ziel), kaĉo (porridge, from kasza / каша kaša), klopodi (to undertake, from kłopot / хлопотать khlopotatʹ), po (per, from po / по po), pra- (proto-, from pra- / пра- pra-), prava (right [in opinion], from prawy / правый pravyj), svati (to matchmake, from swat / сват svat).

Lithuanian: tuj (immediately, from tuoj); possibly also du (two, from dù, if not from Latin duo), the suffix -ope (a number together, cf. dvejopas), and ĝi (it, from ji, jis).

However, although few roots come directly from these languages, Russian exerted a considerable substratum influence on the semantics of Esperanto. An oft-cited example is plena "full, complete", which is Latinate in form (French plein(e), Latin plen- "full"), but has the semantic range of Russian полный polnyi "full, complete", as can be seen in the phrase plena vortaro "a complete dictionary", a usage not possible with the French or Latin words.

=== Other languages ===
Other languages were only represented in the original vocabulary in so far as they were cognate with, or as their words had become widespread in, Esperanto's source languages. However, since that time many languages have contributed words for specialized or regional concepts, such as haŝioj (chopsticks) from Japanese and boaco (reindeer) from Saami.

=== Obscure roots ===
A few roots are obscure:

ĝi (it, s/he), -ujo (suffix for containers), edzo (husband)

Ĝi may possibly derive from the Lithuanian ji (she, it) and jis (he, it), and -ujo from the French étui (case).

Like another indirect German borrowing – fraŭlo (bachelor), which derives from fraŭlino (Miss, from German fräulein) less the feminine suffix -in- – the Esperanto word edzo (husband) appears to be a back-formation of edzino (wife). Zamenhof claimed the latter derives from kronprincedzino (crown princess), borrowed from the German Kronprinzessin, and then internally analyzed as kron- (crown) princ- (prince) edzino (wife). However, Vilborg's Etimologia Vortaro argues that edzino is more likely to have come from Yiddish רביצין rebbetzin (rabbi's wife; Mrs.), reanalysed as rebb-etzin, and that Zamenhof made up the German etymology after the fact to avoid anti-Semitic prejudice against Esperanto. That would mean that edz- ultimately derives from the Slavic feminine suffix -its(a). Regardless, few words have histories this convoluted.

The correlatives, although clearly cognate with European languages (for example, kiel, tiel with French quel (which), tel (such); ĉiu with Italian ciascun (each), and -es with the German genitive -es, etc.), have been analogically leveled to the point that they are often given as examples of Esperanto innovations. This is especially true for the indefinite forms like io (something), which were devised by iconically removing the consonant of the ki- and ti- forms. Likewise, the restriction of the Italian and Greek masculine noun and adjective ending -o to nouns, and the feminine noun and adjective ending -a to adjectives and the article la, is an Esperanto innovation using existing forms.

Some smaller words have been modified to the extent that they're difficult to recognize. For example, Italian a, ad (to) became al (to) under the influence of the Italian contraction al (to the), to better fit the phonotactics of Esperanto, and in a parallel change, Latin ex (out of) and Slavic od (by, than) may have become el (out of) and ol (than), though the latter also has the German parallel als.

== Inflections ==
The Greek origin of the nominal inflections can be seen in the Greek a-declension nouns such as the word for "muse": musa, plural musai, accusative musan, which in Esperanto is muzo, muzoj, muzon. Greek o-declension words such as logos, logoi, logon (word) are similar, as are adjectival declensions such as aksia, aksiai, aksian (worthy). Greek was perhaps also the model of stressed i in Esperanto words like familío (family), which follows the common Greek pattern of aksía (worthy) and oikíai (houses).

Esperanto has a/i/o ablaut for present/past/future tense, which has partial parallels in Latin present amat, perfect amavit, and the corresponding infinitives amare, amavisse. Otto Jespersen said of the ablaut,

This play of vowels is not an original idea of Zamenhof's: -as, -is, -os are found for the three tenses of the infinitive in Faiguet's system of 1765; -a, -i, -o without a consonant are used like Z's -as, -is, -os by Rudelle (1858); Courtonne in 1885 [sic] had -am, -im, -om in the same values, and the similarity with Esperanto is here even more perfect than in the other projects, as -um corresponds to Z's -us. —An International Language (1928)

There may have been a Volapük influence as well, or the two languages may have shared a common influence from earlier languages. In Volapük, the vowels are present a-, future o-, past perfect i-, as well as imperfect ä- [ɛ]; Esperanto retained a distinction between preterite -is and imperfect -es until 1887, the year the modern form of the language was published.

Jespersen didn't parse all of the morphology. The ablaut for the five languages is as follows:

	Faiguet (1765)	Rudelle (1858)	Volapük (1880)	Courtonne (1884)	Esperanto (1887)
present	-a	-a	-a-	-a-	-a-
future	-y	-o	o-	-o-	-o-
past/preterite	-i	-i	i-	(i)	-i-
imperfect	-e	-e	ɛ-	-e-	old -e-
conditional		-ju		-u-	-u-
subjunctive		-u		-ə-	-u

The infinitive suffix -i may derive from Latin deponent verbs, such as loqui (to speak). With elements like these that are only one or two letters long, it is difficult to know whether resemblances are due to the forms being related, or just coincidence. For example, it is speculated that the jussive -u is from the Hebrew imperative -û, but it could also be from the Greek [u] imperative of deponent verbs such as dekhou (receive!); or perhaps it was inspired by [u] being found in both Hebrew and Greek. Similarly, adverbial -e is found in Latin and Italian (bene) as well as in Russian (after a palatalized consonant); the participle bases -t- and -nt- are found in Latin, Italian, Greek, and German; and the pronominal base -i is found in Italian (-mi, -ti, -vi, -si, -gli for Esperanto mi, ci, vi, si, li) and English (me, we, he, she).

There are other parallels with prior constructed languages, such as ili 'they', the numerals un du tri and the feminine suffix -in, which are identical to Jean Pirro's Universalglot of 1868, but it's difficult to tell if there is a connection or if this is merely coincidence due to using similar source languages.

== Technical vocabulary ==
Modern international vocabulary, much of it Latin or Greek in origin, is of course used as well, but frequently for a family of related words only the root will be borrowed directly, and the rest will be derived from it using Esperanto means of word formation. For example, the computer term 'bit' was borrowed directly as bito, but 'byte' was then derived by compounding bito with the numeral ok (eight), for the uniquely Esperanto word bitoko ('an octet of bits'). Although not a familiar form to speakers of European languages, the transparency of its formation is helpful to those who do not have this advantage.

With the exception of perhaps a hundred common or generic plant and animal names, Esperanto adopts the international binomial nomenclature of living organisms, using suitable orthography, and changing the nominal and adjectival grammatical endings to -o and -a. For example, the binomial for the guineafowl is Numida meleagris. In Esperanto, therefore, a numido would be any bird of the genus Numida, and a meleagra numido the helmeted guineafowl specifically. Likewise, a numidedo is any bird in the guineafowl family Numididæ.

== Competing root forms ==
There is some question over which inflection to use when assimilating Latin and Greek words. Zamenhof generally preferred the oblique stem over the nominative singular form, as in reĝo (king), which follows the Latin oblique forms with reg– (compare English regicide), or floro (flower) as in floral, rather than nominative singular rex and flos. However, European national standards differ in this regard, resulting in debate over the form of later "international" borrowings, such as whether the asteroid Pallas should be Palaso in Esperanto, parallel to French and English names Pallas, or Palado, as in Italian Pallade, Russian Паллада (Palláda), and the English adjective Palladian. In some cases there are three possibilities, as can be seen in the English noun helix (x = [ks]), its plural helices (c = [s]), and its adjective helical (c = [k]). Although the resulting potential for conflict is frequently criticized, it does present an opportunity to disambiguate what would otherwise be homonyms based on culturally specific and often fossilized metaphors. For example, Venuso (the planet Venus) may be distinguished from Venero (the goddess Venus), all three of the forms of Latin helix are found as Esperanto roots, one with the original meaning, and the other two representing old metaphors: helico (a spiral), heliko (a snail), helikso (the incurved rim of the ear).

Normally the Latin or Greek inflectional ending is replaced with the Esperanto inflectional ending −o. However, the original inflection will occasionally be retained, as if it were part of the root, in order to disambiguate from a more common word. For example, a virus (from Latin vir-us) is virus-o instead of the expected *vir-o in order to avoid confusion with vir-o (a man), and the Latin root corp-us is the source of both korp-o (a living body) and korpus-o (a military corps). Similarly, when the sound ĥ is replaced with k, as it commonly is (see Esperanto phonology), the word ĥoro (a chorus) is replaced with koruso to avoid creating a homonym with koro (a heart). The redundant inflection may have been inspired by Lithuanian, which otherwise contributed relatively little to Esperanto: compare fokuso (focus), kokoso (coconut), lotuso (lotus), patoso (pathos), radiuso (radius), sinuso (sine), and viruso (virus), with Lithuanian fokusas, kokosas, lotosas, patosas, radiusas, sinusas, and virusas (virus) vs. vyras (man).

== Traces of Proto-Esperanto ==
Proto-Esperanto had voicing ablaut, traces of which remain in a few pairs of words such as pezi 'to weigh' (to have weight) and pesi 'to weigh' (to measure the weight). Because little of Proto-Esperanto is attested, it is not clear which other aspects of Esperanto etymology might date to this period.

== Bibliography ==
- Vilborg, Ebbe, Etimologia Vortaro de Esperanto. Five volumes, Stokholmo, 1987–2001.
- Cherpillod, André, Konciza Etimologia Vortaro. One volume, Roterdamo, 2003.
