= Konishi =

Konishi (written: 小西) is a Japanese surname. Notable people with the surname include:

- Akane Konishi (小西 あかね; born 1995), Japanese ice hockey player
- Gaku Konishi (小西 岳; 1934–2018), Japanese physicist
- Hiroko Konishi (小西 寛子; born 1975), Japanese voice actress
- Konishi Hirosada (小西 廣貞; ca. 1810–1864), Japanese ukiyo-e artist
- Hiroyuki Konishi (gymnast) (小西 裕之; born 1963), Japanese gymnast
- Hokuto Konishi (born 1984), Japanese-born British dancer
- Katsuyuki Konishi (小西 克幸; born 1973), Japanese voice actor
- Kenichi Konishi (小西 健一; 1909–1986), Japanese field hockey player
- Manami Konishi (小西 真奈美; born 1978), Japanese actress
- Masakazu Konishi (小西 正一; 1933–2020), Japanese neurobiologist
- Miho Konishi (小西 美帆; born 1977), Japanese actress
- Nagako Konishi (born 1945), Japanese composer
- Ryosei Konishi (小西 遼生; born 1982), Japanese actor and voice actor
- Sachiko Konishi (小西 祥子; born 1982), Japanese racewalker
- Sadaaki Konishi (1916–1949), Imperial Japanese Army officer
- Takako Konishi (office worker) (1973–2001), Japanese office worker and suicide victim
- Takako Konishi (synchronized swimmer) (born 1986), Japanese synchronized swimmer
- Tokuro Konishi (小西 得郎; 1894–1977), Japanese baseball player and coach
- Toshiro Konishi (1953–2016), Japanese-Peruvian chef, musician and television personality
- Yasuharu Konishi (小西 康陽; born 1959), Japanese musician, composer and DJ
- Yasuhiro Konishi (小西 康裕; 1893–1983), Japanese karateka
- Yoshiyuki Konishi (小西 良幸; born 1950), Japanese fashion designer
- Yukari Konishi (born 1979), Japanese sport shooter
- Konishi Yukinaga (小西 行長; 1555–1600), Japanese daimyō
- Yudai Konishi (小西 雄大; born 1998), Japanese footballer
- Yuta Konishi (小西 勇太; born 1990), Japanese hurdler

== See also ==
- Konishi anomaly, a physics anomaly
