= Esperanto profanity =

Like natural languages, the constructed language Esperanto contains profane words and indecent vocabulary. Some of this was formulated out of the established core vocabulary, or by giving specific profane or indecent senses to regularly formed Esperanto words. Other instances represent informal neologisms that remain technically outside the defined vocabulary of the language, but have become established by usage.

== Types ==
Esperanto distinguishes between profanity and obscenity (this distinction is not always made in English). Profanity in Esperanto is called sakro, after the older French sacre, and consists of what English speakers would call "oaths": religious or impious references used as interjections, or to excoriate the subject of the speaker's anger. According to Renato Corsetti, former president of the World Esperanto Association, sakro is "a word or phrase used to express one's indignation or anger or similar sentiment, not directly addressed to a particular person."

Obscenity in Esperanto is described as maldeca or nedeca ("indecent"), triviala ("vulgar, indelicate, low-class"), tabua ("taboo"), pika ("sharp, stinging") or malnobla ("ignoble"). These are the Esperanto words that refer to sexual acts and bodily functions in non-clinical ways.

Alos & Velkov (1991) use vocabulary along these lines, put into the "mallongoj" (abbreviation) legend:

GV	ĝenerala vortaro - normala vorto	general vocabulary – normal words
Jar	ĵargono - pika vorto, kiu ne uzindas en pruda konversacio	jargon – a sharp word, not to be used in "prude" conversation
Neo	neologismo - proponita vorto far aŭtoro, apenaŭ uzata	neologism – word proposed by an author, little used
Mit	mitologio	mythology
Sci	scienca - faka (ofte medicina) vorto	scientific – a professional (often medical) word

== Sources ==
As a planned language designed for international communication neither interjections to be used in anger, expletives nor familiar expressions for sex acts and bodily functions were priorities for L. L. Zamenhof, and as such this sort of vocabulary does not loom large in either the Unua Libro nor in the Fundamento de Esperanto. According to Alos and Velkov, "neither Zamenhof nor the other pioneers of the international language used obscene words in their works; nevertheless, they all tried to make Esperanto a real language."

Alos and Velkov's remarks suggest a belief that a language without expletives or familiar expressions for sex acts and bodily functions is incomplete. Such a language would fail to respond to all of the situations that humans use language for. In furtherance of making Esperanto more "real" in this sense, Esperantists have created or invented the vocabulary thought to be missing. A number of important Esperantists have worked to further this effort.

In 1931, the poet Kálmán Kalocsay published Sekretaj sonetoj ("Secret Sonnets"), a poem cycle on erotic themes, that helped circulate some of the unofficial root words that form part of the basis of familiar sexual expressions in Esperanto. In 1981, Hektor Alos and Kiril Velkov published a small pamphlet on Tabuaj vortoj en Esperanto: vortaro, kun ekzemploj pri praktika uzado ("Taboo words in Esperanto: a dictionary with examples for practical use") that also discussed Esperanto sexual expressions and oaths; their pamphlet was distributed by the major Esperanto language book services. In 1987, Renato Corsetti, who later became president of the World Esperanto Association, published Knedu min, Sinjorino: tabuaj kaj insultaj esprimoj en Esperanto ("Knead me, madam: taboo and insulting expressions in Esperanto"), that also discussed this aspect of Esperanto vocabulary, and increased its coverage of interjections and expletives. The title of Corsetti's book plays on that of Kredu Min, Sinjorino! ("Believe Me, Madam"), a well-received original novel in Esperanto by Cezaro Rossetti.

=== Generated words ===
Some of the profane vocabulary of Esperanto is derived by giving specific and profane meanings to words formed according to the regular methods of Esperanto grammar. For example, one Esperanto word for "a female prostitute" is ĉiesulino. This word, which has no direct cognate in any European language, is confected entirely from a priori elements belonging to Esperanto alone: a female (-in-) person (-ul-) who "belongs to everyone" (ĉies). This last root is one of the systematically formed Esperanto correlatives. While the word could mean anything indicated by its constituent parts, usage has confined it to this particular sense. Since Esperanto grammar regularly allows the creation of new words, it lends itself to the generation of a large number of synonyms; as an example of the process, the words publikulo ("public person"), stratulo ("street person", compare English streetwalker) and sinvendisto ("self-seller") have all been coined to refer to prostitutes.

In addition to this formation, the word putino also means a female prostitute, from a widely distributed Romance root. Esperanto also has the formal verb prostitui, to prostitute.

Esperanto grammar allows and encourages the development of new vocabulary along these lines. The Esperanto word seksumi means "to have sexual intercourse" or, more generally, to engage in sexual activity; it combines the word for "gender" (sekso) with the indefinite kadigan suffix -um-; fingrumi, "to masturbate", is a similar construction on the word for "finger" (fingro), though the normal meaning of the word is "to feel/touch with the fingers"; and langumi, to fellate, from lango, "tongue" as a body part. An oblique word for menstruation is monataĵo, combining monato "month" with a suffix meaning roughly "matter".

Other Esperanto profanities are simply the Esperanto words that name subjects invoked as oaths. The devil (diablo) is frequently invoked in these, with phrases such as Diablo prenu ĝin! ("May the Devil take it!"), Diablo manĝu vin! ("May the Devil eat you!") and Kia diablaĵo! ("What a piece of deviltry!")

The fundamental vocabulary of Esperanto contains a number of pejoratives. The root fuŝ- means "to botch" or "to bungle", and as such figures prominently in some of these formations; a fuŝado is a FUBAR situation. Fuŝ- also figures as a pejorative prefix. The prefix fi- (roughly, "immoral") and the suffix -aĉ- (roughly, "bad, inferior") are also parts of the core vocabulary with pejorative functions; they have been combined to produce words such as fiaĉulo, a thoroughly disgusting person. Fek- is the Esperanto root for dung; Alos and Velkov report encountering combinations like fikfek ("fuck-shit")

=== Non-profane words used in certain contexts ===
As in many natural languages, some medical/anatomical terms can be taboo or profane if used outside the medical context. A&V give examples such as libido (Sci), meleno (Sci) or menopaŭzo (Sci); or normal words like lubriki (GV) - to lubricate or menstruation, menstruo (GV).

=== Mock-sacralities ===
Another source of Esperanto profanity is mock-sacrilegious terms, which are humorous oaths that refer to Esperanto culture. These uses are cultural references without any taboo connotation, but used as if they were profanities. The use of phrases like Aktoj de la Akademio! ("Acts of the Academy") and Fundamenta Krestomatio! ("Fundamental Chrestomathy") invoke the names of Esperanto institutions and Dr. Zamenhof's books. A similar form of profanity in a natural language can be seen in Quebec French profanity.

=== Minced oaths (vortludoj) ===
As in American English or Russian, variations of stress from an affixed root to a suffixed root or vice versa may give the word another, profane meaning (international students' pun: an-alysis (calculus) to anal-lysis). Other forms of mincing to "profane" an everyday word or "de-fame" a profanity (like hell→heck in Puritan countries, or artistic: words like "frack" or "feldercarp" in Battlestar Galactica) are exchanging a consonant or vowel, or adding/omitting a circumflex (ĉ to c or vice versa).

=== Neologisms ===
Other such words in Esperanto are technically "neologisms", words that were not added to the core vocabulary by Dr. Zamenhof, nor made official by the Esperanto Academy. Many of the items of the profane vocabulary do not appear in the official word list published by the Esperanto Academy. They appear, nevertheless, in standard reference works such as Gaston Waringhien's Plena Ilustrita Vortaro de Esperanto, often with the note that they are indecent neologisms.

In 1932, Kálmán Kalocsay (writing as "Peter Peneter") publicized, if he did not invent, much of the informal sexual vocabulary of Esperanto in his poem cycle Sekretaj sonetoj ("Secret Sonnets"). The poems conclude with an appendix, also set forth in verse, that defines each of the neologisms found in the poems themselves, including Esperanto roots such as fiki, "to fuck", borrowed from German; kaco, "cock" in the sense of "penis", borrowed from Italian; and piĉo, "cunt", borrowed from Slavic. One of Kalocsay's poems consists of little more than a listing of synonyms for sexual intercourse generated by the combinatory possibilities or metaphorically extended meanings of Esperanto words:

Por la unua, dolĉa foj': deflori,
kaj poste: nupti, karnon miksi, trui,
seksumi, kaj koiti, kaj geĝui,
kopuli, kohabiti kaj amori.
Enpafi, ŝtopi, vosti, grotesplori,
palisi, kaj bambui, kaj geglui,
kunkuŝi, kaj interne intervjui,
bombardi sube, mini, lanci, bori.
Kaj broson brosi, glavon karnan ingi,
buteron kirli, sondi, piŝti, piki,
kamenbalai, inan ingon klingi,
surpingli, karnon planti, truon fliki,
la brulon per la akvotub' estingi,
tranajli, spili, ŝargi, farĉi, fiki.

For the first, sweet time: deflowering,
and later: consummating, mixing flesh, holing,
having sex, and having coitus, and experiencing pleasure with two genders,
copulating, cohabitating and making love.
Shooting inside, plugging, tailing, cave exploring,
staking, and bambooing, and the gluing of two genders,
lying together, and interviewing internally,
bombarding below, mining, lancing, boring.
And brushing the brush, sheathing the sword of flesh,
churning butter, probing, pistoning, pricking,
chimney sweeping, blading the female sheath.
Pinning, planting flesh, mending a hole,
extinguishing the burn with the waterhose,
nailing, broaching, loading, stuffing, fucking.

Once a root achieves currency in Esperanto, it becomes available to all of the derivational processes of Esperanto grammar; so that fiki "to fuck" is the source for fikilo, a dildo or a penis, literally a tool (-ilo) for fucking; and for many other regularly formed words.
