= Esperanto lexicographers =

Esperanto lexicographers are individuals or groups, whether enthusiastic amateurs or trained linguists, who have produced single-language or bilingual dictionaries of Esperanto.

More than 130 Esperantists, working singly or collectively, have published such dictionaries; several of these authors are listed in the "Esperanto lexicographers" category.

In the specific case of Esperanto, most dictionary authors historically were and today still are non-specialists in the field of lexicography. A notable exception is Erich-Dieter Krause, a German professor of Indonesian, who wrote comprehensive dictionaries, both German–Esperanto (2007) and Esperanto-German (1999).

Though most Esperanto dictionary compilers have been men, notable female Esperanto lexicographers include Adriana J. Middelkoop, who wrote Dutch–Esperanto and Esperanto–Dutch dictionaries (1971) and Ilona Koutny, chief editor of a Hungarian–Esperanto dictionary, 1996).

Because compiling a dictionary demands great linguistic expertise and may be the labour of many years, most dictionary writers were only able to accomplish the feat in their elder years; however, the Austrian Eugen Wüster wrote the core of his encyclopedic Esperanto–German dictionary, published in 1923, as an early-20s university student. The German Eckhard Bick, having emigrated to Denmark, published his Danish dictionary at 32.

The professions of Esperanto lexicographers vary widely; one may find teachers (Atanas D. Atanasov, Paul Bennemann, Émile Grosjean-Maupin, Boris Kolker, etc.), theologians like Jan Filip, literary professionals such as Gaston Waringhien, translators (Fernando de Diego) or journalists (Joseph Rhodes, Razen Manandhar), but also many technicians and engineers (Rüdiger Eichholz, Ottó Haszpra, etc.) Both André Albault and L.L. Zamenhof were ophthalmologists, while Montagu C. Butler was a musician.

Sometimes, too, a collective has compiled a dictionary. An example is the editorial committee of the Japanese Esperanto Institute, under the guidance of Gaku Konishi and Gotoo Hitosi. Founded in 1990, the committee eventually published its Esperanto–Japanese dictionary in 2006.

== Sources ==
- Jennings, G. (1965). Personalities of Language. Apollo editions. Crowell.
- Language Problems & Language Planning. University of Texas Press. 2003. ISSN 1569-9889.
