= Moncontour =

Moncontour may refer to:

- Moncontour, Côtes-d'Armor, a commune in the Côtes-d'Armor department in France
- Moncontour, Vienne, a commune in the Vienne department in France
- The Battle of Moncontour in 1569
