= Joachim Faiguet de Villeneuve =

- Born: 16 October 1703; Moncontour
- Died: 10 November 1781 (aged 78); Néris-les-Bains, Allier

Joachim Faiguet de Villeneuve (16 October 1703 – 10 November 1781) was an 18th-century French economist.

== Biography ==
First a schoolmaster in Paris and then trésorier de France in the office of Châlons-en-Champagne, Faiguet wrote several articles for the Encyclopédie ou Dictionnaire raisonné des sciences, des arts et des métiers by Diderot including Citation, Dimanche, Epargne, Etude, Explicite, Expulser, Extraction des racines, Fêtes des chrétiens, Fidèle, Langue nouvelle, Maîtrises, Moraves, Sanctification, Terres, mesure des, and Usure.

Under the heading Dimanche (Sunday), he advocated the use of the poor on Sunday afternoon to community service tasks, both to give them an extra income as well as to maintain the risk of idleness.

Faiguet is still known for different pieces of prose and verse inserted in the Mercure de France and other newspapers.

He invented, for the service of armies, a sort of mobile and portable ovens, of which the Mémoires de l’académie des sciences of the year 1761 made an honorable mention.

He was also the first in France to have made a bread composed with three equal portions of wheat, rye and potatoes.

== Publications ==
- 1763: L’Économe politique, contenant des moyens pour enrichir et perfectionner l’espèce humaine, Paris, in-12°. Dans une des dissertations que ce traité renferme, Faiguet propose l’établissement d’une régie ou compagnie perpétuelle dans le royaume, pour recevoir les petites épargnes des artisans, des domestiques, etc. Il a reproduit plusieurs exemplaires de son ouvrage, sous le titre de 1766: l’Ami des Pauvres, ou l’Économe politique, etc., 1766, in-12°; Il y a joint un Mémoire sur la diminution des fêtes, imprimé avec des signes ou caractères nouveaux qui le rendent fort difficile à lire. Il pensait que l’orthographe du français devait être rapprochée de sa prononciation. (The political econome, containing means to enrich and perfect the human species, Paris, in-12 °. In one of the dissertations which this treatise contains, Faiguet proposes the establishment of a régie or perpetual company in the kingdom, to receive the small savings of the craftsmen, the servants, & c. Several copies of his work were reproduced, under the title : the Friend of the Poor, or the Political Econome, etc., 1766, in-12 °; It has a Memoir attached on the diminution of festivals, printed with new signs or characters which make it very difficult to read. He thought that the spelling of French should be close to its pronunciation.)
- 1766: Mémoire pour la suppression des fêtes. (Memory for the suppression of celebration.)
- 1769: L’entretien de nos troupes, à la décharge de l’État. (The maintenance of our troops, the discharge of the state.)
- 1770: Légitimité de l’usure légale, où l’on prouve son utilité; que les casuistes sont en contradiction avec eux-mêmes. Monts de piété. Pratique injuste de la poste. Où l’on discute les passages de l’Ancien et du Nouveau Testament sur l’usure, etc. By J. Faiguet de Villeneuve. Amsterdam, Marc-Michel Rey. (Legitimacy of legal wear, where one proves its utility; that the casuists are in contradiction with themselves. Mounts of piety. Unfair practice of the post office. Where we discuss the Old and New Testament passages on usury, etc. By J. Faiguet of Villeneuve. Amsterdam, Marc-Michel Rey,)
- 1770: L’utile emploi des religieux et des communautés, ou Mémoire politique à l’avantage des habitants de la campagne. By J. Faiguet de Villeneuve. Amsterdam, Marc-Michel Rey) (The useful employment of religious and communities, or Political Memory for the benefit of the inhabitants of the countryside. By J. Faiguet of Villeneuve. Amsterdam, Marc-Michel Rey)
- 1770: Mémoires politiques sur la conduite des finances et sur d’autres objets intéressans. Ouvrage où réunissant les intérêts du Roi et ceux des sujets, on propose des moyens pour fournir aux besoins de l’Etat, et pour procurer une aisance générale. By J. Faiguet de Villeneuve. Amsterdam, Marc-Michel Rey, 1720 [sic, pour 1770] (Political memoirs on the conduct of finances and other objects of interest. A work in which, combining the interests of the King and those of the subjects, means are proposed to supply the needs of the State, and to procure a general ease. By J. Faiguet of Villeneuve. Amsterdam, Marc-Michel Rey, 1720 [sic, for 1770])

== Bibliography ==
- François-Xavier de Feller, Dictionnaire historique, vol. 8, Paris, E. Houdaille, 1836, p. 41.
- Noah Shusterman: Religion and the Politics of Time: Holidays in France from Louis XIV Through Napoleon. Catholic University of America Press (2010) ISBN 0-8132-1725-3 p. 101–111
