= Esperanto vocabulary =

Words in the Esperanto language

The original word base of Esperanto contained around 900 root words and was defined in Unua Libro ("First Book"), published by L. L. Zamenhof in 1887. In 1894, Zamenhof published the first Esperanto dictionary, Universala vortaro ("International Dictionary"), which was written in five languages and supplied a larger set of root words, adding 1740 new words.

The rules of the Esperanto language allow speakers to borrow words as needed, recommending only that they look for the most international words, and that they borrow one basic word and derive others from it, rather than borrowing many words with related meanings. Since then, many words have been borrowed from other languages, primarily those of Western Europe. In recent decades, most of the new borrowings or coinages have been technical or scientific terms; terms in everyday use are more likely to be derived from existing words (for example komputilo [a computer], from komputi [to compute]), or extending them to cover new meanings (for example muso [a mouse], now also signifies a computer input device, as in English). There are frequent debates among Esperanto speakers about whether a particular borrowing is justified, or whether the need can be met by derivation or extending the meaning of existing words.

== Origins ==
Esperanto occupies a middle ground between "naturalistic" constructed languages such as Interlingua, which take words en masse from their source languages with little internal derivation, and a priori conlangs such as Solresol, in which the words have no historical connection to other languages. In Esperanto, root words are borrowed and retain much of the form of their source language, whether the phonetic form (eks- from ex-) or orthographic form (teamo from team). However, each root can then form dozens of derivations that may bear little resemblance to equivalent words in the source languages, such as registaro (government), which is derived from the Latinate root reg (to rule).

== Word formation ==
One of the ways Zamenhof made Esperanto easier to learn than the European languages predominant at the time was by creating a regular and highly productive derivational morphology. Through the judicious use of lexical affixes (prefixes and suffixes), the core vocabulary needed for communication was greatly reduced, making Esperanto a more agglutinative language than most European languages. It has been estimated that on average one root in Esperanto is the communicative equivalent of ten words in English.

However, a contrary tendency is apparent in cultured and Greco-Latin technical vocabulary, which most Europeans see as "international" and therefore take into Esperanto en masse, despite the fact they are not truly universal. Many Asians consider this to be an onerous and unnecessary burden on the memory, when it is so easy to derive equivalent words internally (for example by calquing them, which is what Chinese often does). This sparks frequent debates as to whether a particular root is justified, and sometimes results in duplicates of native and borrowed vocabulary. An example is "calligraphy", which occurs both as a calqued belskribo ("writing of beauty") and as the direct borrowing kaligrafio. A similar development has also occurred in English (brotherly vs. fraternal), German (Ornithologie vs. Vogelkunde for ornithology), Japanese (beesubooru vs. yakyuu for baseball), Spanish (básquetbol vs. baloncesto for basketball), French (le week-end vs. la fin de semaine), and other languages. However, although the debates in ethnic languages are motivated by nationalism or issues of cultural identity, in Esperanto the debates are largely motivated by differing views on how to make the language practical and accessible.

=== Affixes ===
One of the most immediately useful derivational affixes for the beginner is the prefix mal-, which derives antonyms: peza (heavy), malpeza (light); supren (upwards), malsupren (downwards); ami (to love), malami (to hate); lumo (light), mallumo (darkness). However, except in jokes, this prefix is not used when an antonym exists in the basic vocabulary: suda (south), not "malnorda" from 'north'; manki (to be lacking, intr.), not "malesti" from 'to be'.

The creation of new words through the use of grammatical (i.e. inflectional) suffixes, such as nura (mere) from nur (only), tiama (contemporary) from tiam (then), or vido (sight) from vidi (to see), is covered in the article on Esperanto grammar. What follows is a list of what are usually called "affixes". Most of them, however, are actually lexical roots, in that they can be used as independent words and their relative order in a compound is determined by semantics, not grammar. They are called "affixes" mainly because they derive from affixes in Esperanto's source languages. Some are true affixes in that, although they may be used independently, their order within a word is fixed by the grammar. Only a few cannot be used independently and so correspond to how a typical affix behaves in English.

When a root receives more than one affix, their order matters, because affixes modify the entire stem they are attached to. That is, the outer ones modify the inner ones. Most affixes are themselves roots, and as such have an inherent part of speech. This is indicated by the final part-of-speech vowel in the suffix list below. A few affixes do not affect the part of speech of the root; for the suffixes listed in the tables below, this is indicated by a hyphen in place of the final vowel.

==== List of lexical suffixes ====
-aĉ-	pejorative (expresses negative affect or a poor opinion of the object or action)	skribaĉi (to scrawl, from 'write'); veteraĉo (foul weather); domaĉo (a hovel, from 'house'); rigardaĉi (to gape at, from 'look at'); belaĉa (tawdry, from 'beautiful'); aĵaĉo (junk, from -aĵo); aĉigi (to screw up, with -igi); aĉ! (yuck!)
-adi, -ado	frequent, repeated, or continual action (often imperfective); as a noun, an action or process	kuradi (to keep on running); parolado (a speech, from 'talk, speak'); adi (to carry on); ada (continual)
-aĵo	a concrete manifestation; (with a noun root) a product	manĝaĵo (food, from 'eat'); novaĵo (news, a novelty, from 'new'); glaciaĵo (an ice[cream], from 'ice'); bovaĵo (beef, from 'bovine'); aĉigaĵo (a snafu, from -aĉ and -igi); aĵo (a thing);
-ano	a member, follower, participant, inhabitant	kristano (a Christian); usonano (a US American) [cf. amerikano (a continental American)]; ŝipano (a crew member); samkursano (a classmate, from 'same' and 'course'); samideano (a kindred spirit, from 'same' and 'idea'); ano (a member)
-aro	a collective group without specific number	arbaro (a forest, from 'tree'); vortaro (a dictionary, from 'word' [a set expression]); homaro (humanity, from 'human' [a set expression; 'crowd, mob' is homamaso]); ŝafaro (a flock of sheep); ŝiparo (a fleet of ships); anaro (a society [group of members], from -ano); registaro (a government, from 'rule, govern' and -isto); aro (a herd, group, set)
-ĉjo	masculine affectionate form; the root is truncated	Joĉjo (Jack); paĉjo (daddy); fraĉjo (bro); amiĉjo (dear friend); la iĉjoj (the 'boys')
-ebla	possible	kredebla (believable); videbla (visible); eble (possibly)
-eco	an abstract quality	amikeco (friendship); bono or boneco (goodness); italeca (Italianesque); ecaro (character [sum of qualities], with -aro)
-eg-	augmentative; sometimes pejorative connotations when used with people	domego (a mansion, from 'house'); virego (a giant, from 'man'); librego (a tome, from 'book'); varmega (boiling hot); ridegi (to guffaw, from 'laugh'); ega (great, humongous)
-ejo	a place characterized by the root (not used for toponyms)	lernejo (a school, from 'to learn'), vendejo (a store, from 'to sell'), juĝejo (a court, from 'to judge'), kuirejo (a kitchen, from 'to cook'), hundejo (a kennel, from 'dog'), senakvejo (a desert, from 'without water'); devenejo (provenance, from 'to come from'); ejo (the appropriate place)
-ema	having a propensity, tendency	ludema (playful), parolema (talkative), kredema (credulous, from 'believe'); brulema (flammable, from 'burn'); emo (inclination); malema (unwilling, with mal-)
-enda	mandatory	pagenda (payable), legendaĵo (required reading)
-ero	the smallest part	ĉenero (a link, from 'chain'); fajrero (a spark, from 'fire'); neĝero (a snowflake, from 'snow'), kudrero (a stitch, from 'sew'), lignero (a splinter, from 'wood'); okulero (an ommatidium, from 'eye'); usonero (a U.S. state, from 'USA'); vortero (a morpheme, from 'word'); ero (a crumb etc.)
-estro	a leader, boss	lernejestro (a school principal [see -ejo]); urbestro (a mayor, from 'city'); centestro (a centurion, from 'hundred'); usonestro (a president of the United States, from 'USA'); estraro (board of directors, with -aro)
-et-	diminutive; sometimes affectionate connotations when used with people	dometo (a hut, from 'house'); libreto (a booklet); varmeta (lukewarm); rideti (to smile, from 'laugh'); rompeti (to crack, fracture, from 'break'); boleti (to simmer, from 'boil'); ete (slightly)
-io	a country named after a geographic feature, and now after an ethnicity [unofficial]	Meksikio (Mexico, from 'Mexico City'); Niĝerio (Nigeria, from 'the river Niger'); Anglio (England, from 'English person'); patrio (fatherland, from 'father') [cannot be used as a root io, because that means 'something']
-iĉo	male [unofficial]	boviĉo (a bull); patriĉo (a father); studentiĉo (a male student); iĉo (a male)
-ido	an offspring, descendant	katido (a kitten); reĝido (a prince, from 'king'); arbido (a sapling, from 'tree'); izraelido (an Israelite); ido (a kit, pup, kid, etc.); idaro (a clan, tribe, with -aro)
-igi	to make, to cause (transitivizer/causative)	mortigi (to kill, from 'die'); purigi (to clean); konstruigi (to have built); igi (to cause)
-iĝi	to become (intransitivizer/inchoative/middle voice)	amuziĝi (to enjoy oneself); naskiĝi (to be born); ruĝiĝi (to blush, from 'red'); aniĝi (to join, from -ano); iĝi (to become)
-ilo	an instrument, a tool	ludilo (a toy, from 'play'); tranĉilo (a knife, from 'cut'); helpilo (a remedy, from 'help'); solvilo (a solution, from 'solve'); ilo (a tool); ilaro (equipment, set of tools, with -aro)
-ino	female	bovino (a cow); patrino (a mother); studentino (a female student); ino (a female)
-inda	worthy of	memorinda (memorable); kredinda (credible, from 'believe'); fidinda (dependable, trustworthy, from 'trust'); plorindaĵo (something to cry about, from 'weep, cry' and -aĵo); inda (worthy)
-ingo	a holder, sheath	glavingo (a scabbard, from 'sword'); kandelingo (a candle-holder); dentingo (a tooth socket); piedingo (stirrup, from 'foot'); kuglingo (a cartridge, from 'bullet'); ingo (a socket, etc.)
-ismo	a doctrine, system (as in English)	komunismo (Communism); kristanismo (Christianity); ismo (an ism)
-isto	person professionally or avocationally occupied with an idea or activity (a narrower use than in English)	instruisto (teacher); dentisto (dentist); abelisto (a beekeeper); komunisto (a communist); registo (a member of parliament/congress)
-njo	feminine affectionate form; the root is truncated	Jonjo (Joanie); panjo (mommy); anjo (granny); onjo (aunty); vanjo (nanny, from 'nurse'); aminjo (dear friend); la injoj (the 'girls', from -ino or -ido)
-obla	multiple	duobla (double); trioble (triply); oble (more than once)
-ono	fraction	duona (half [of]); centono (one hundredth); dekonaĵo (a tithe, from 'ten' and -aĵo); ono (a fraction); onigi (to divide into equal parts, with -igi)
-ope	in a collective group of specific number	duope (two together; by twos = po du); triopo (a trilogy); kiomope (how many together?); arope (together in a group, from -aro); gutope (drop by drop, from 'drop'; = pogute); unuopa (isolated, individual); opo (a group, unit, team); opa (collective)
-ujo	a (loose) container, country (archaic when referring to a political entity), a tree of a certain fruit (archaic)	monujo (a purse, from 'money'); salujo (a saltshaker, from 'salt'); lavujo (a washbasin, from 'wash'); abelujo (a beehive, from 'bee'); Anglujo (England [Anglio in current usage]); Kurdujo (Kurdistan, the Kurdish lands); pomujo (appletree [now pomarbo]); ujo (a container)
-ulo	one characterized by the root	junulo (a youth); sanktulo (a saint, from 'holy'); abocoulo (a beginning reader [student, not book], from aboco "ABC's"); mamulo (a mammal, from 'breast'); proksimulo (a neighbor, from 'near'); multinfanulino (a woman with many children, from multa 'many' and infano 'child'); senindulo (someone without merit, from 'without' and the suffix -ind); aĉulo ~ ulaĉo (a wretch, from the suffix aĉ); tiamulo (a contemporary, from 'then'); kialulo (someone who asks 'why' a lot, from 'why'); etulino (a wisp of a girl); ulo (a fellow)
-um-	undefined ad hoc suffix (used sparingly: see list)	kolumo (a collar, from 'neck'); krucumi (to crucify, from 'cross'); malvarmumo (a cold, from 'cold'); plenumi (to fulfill, from 'full'); brakumi (to hug, from 'arm'); amindumi (to woo, from 'lovable' [see -ind]); dekstrume (clockwise, from 'right'); kortumo (appellate court, from 'court(yard)'); mondumo (high society, from 'world'); komunumo (a community, from 'common'); proksimume (approximately, from 'near'); deksesuma (hexadecimal, from '16'); umo (a thingamajig)

==== List of prefixes ====
bo-	relation by marriage, -in-law	bopatro (a father-in-law); boparenciĝi (to marry into a family, from parenco 'a relative' and -iĝi); boedziĝi (to marry one's dead brother's wife, from edziĝi 'to marry'); boedzino (a sister-wife); boamiko ([jocular] a friend of one's spouse)
dis-	separation, scattering	disĵeti (to throw about, from 'throw'); dissendi (to distribute, from 'send'); disatomi (to split by atomic fission, from 'atom'); disliberiĝi (to escape in all directions, like pages dropping from a book with a disintegrated binding, from 'free' and -iĝi); dis! (scram!)
ek-	beginning, sudden, or momentary action (often perfective)	ekbrilo (a flash [of lightning], from 'shine'); ekami (to fall in love); ekkrii (to cry out); ekvidi (to catch sight of); eki (to start); ekde (inclusive 'from'); ek al la batalo! (off to war!); ek! (hop to!)
eks-	former, ex-	eksedzo (an ex-husband); eksbovo (a steer [jocular, from 'bull']); eksa (former); ekskutima (previously customary); Eks la estro! (Down with our leader!)
fi-	shameful, nasty, disgusting, filthy	fihomo (a wicked person); fimensa (foul-minded); fivorto (a profane word); fibuŝo (a dirty mouth); fibesto (vermin, from 'animal, beast'); fia (vile); fie! (For shame!); Fi al vi! (Shame on you!)
ge-	both sexes together	gepatroj (parents); gesinjoroj (ladies and gentlemen); gekelneroj (waiters and waitresses); la ge-Zamenhofoj (the Zamenhofs)
mal-	antonym	malgranda (small, from 'large'); malriĉa (poor, from 'rich'); malplena (empty, from 'full'); malino (a male [jocular], from -ino); maldekstrume (counter-clockwise [see -um]); nemalobeebla leĝo (a law that cannot be disobeyed, from obe- 'to obey'), mala (opposite)
mis-	incorrectly, awry	misloki (to misplace); misakuzi (to wrongly accuse); misfamiga (disparaging, from fama 'well-known' and the causative suffix -ig-); mise (incorrectly)
pra-	great-(grand-), primordial, primitive, proto-	praavo (a great-grandfather); prapatro (a forefather); prabesto (a prehistoric beast); prahejmo (ancestral home); prahindeŭropa (Proto-Indo-European)
re-	over again, back again	resendi (to send back); rekonstrui (to rebuild); resalti (to rebound, from 'jump'); rediri (to repeat); reaboni (to renew a subscription, from 'subscribe'); rebrilo (reflection, glare, from 'shine'); reira bileto (a return ticket, from iri 'to go'); refoje (once again, from '[x] times'); ĝis (la) revido ("au revoir", from ĝis 'until' and vido 'sight')

There are, in addition, affixes not listed here: technical affixes, such as the biological family suffix -edo seen in numidedo (Guineafowls), and a few non-standard affixes taken from Ido, such as -oza (full of) in montoza (mountainous), muskoloza (muscular), poroza (porous). A proposed suffix -ala makes adjectives out of nouns made from adjectives: varmala (caloric, from varma warm), ŝtataligi (nationalize).

Lexical (i.e. derivational) affixes may act as roots by taking one of the grammatical suffixes: mala (opposite), eta (slight), ano (a member), umo (a doohickey), eble (possibly), iĝi (to become), ero (a bit, a crumb). Also, through compounding, lexical roots may act as affixes: vidi (to see), povi (to be able to), vidpova (able to see, not blind); ĉefo (head, chief), urbo (a city), ĉefurbo (a capital). It is quite common for prepositions to be used as prefixes: alveni (to arrive), from al (to) and veni (come); senespera (hopeless), from sen (without) and espero (hope); pripensi (to consider), from pri (about) and pensi (to think); vendi pogrande (sell wholesale), from po (at the rate of) and grande (large [quantity]), etc. There is even aliĝilo (registration form), from the preposition al (to) and the suffixes -iĝ- (to become) and -ilo (an instrument).

=== Compounds ===
Compound words in Esperanto are similar to English, in that the final root is basic to the meaning. The roots may be joined together directly, or with an epenthetic (linking) vowel to aid pronunciation. This epenthetic vowel is most commonly the nominal suffix -o-, used regardless of number or case, but other grammatical suffixes may be used when the inherent part of speech of the first root of the compound needs to be changed.

kantobirdo (a songbird) versus birdokanto (a birdsong)
velŝipo (a sailship) versus ŝipvelo (a ship sail)
centjaro (a centennial [a year of a hundred]) versus jarcento (a century [a hundred of years])
multekosta (expensive, with an adverbial -e-)

Prepositions are frequently found in compounds, and behave much like prefixes,

pripensi ion (to consider something) versus pensi pri io (to think about something).

Since affixes may be used as root words, and roots may combine like affixes, the boundary between the two is blurred. Many so-called affixes are indistinguishable from other roots. However, "true" affixes are grammatically fixed as being either prefixes or suffixes, whereas the order of roots in compounds is determined by semantics.

Although Zamenhof did not prescribe rules for which consonant sequences are not acceptable and therefore when the epenthetic -o- is required, he generally omitted it when the result was a sequence of two consonants, as in velŝipo above. However, he inserted an -o-,

- when the two consonants that would come together differed in voicing, and would both become different consonants if their voicing were changed, as in rozokolora (rose-colored). This prevents the voicing assimilation that is so prevalent in the world's languages, including Zamenhof's Russian and German, and that would result in "rozkolora" being mispronounced as */roskolora/ (dew-colored) or */rozɡolora/. This is not a problem for sonorants, such as l, r, m, n, j, which do not have voiceless equivalents in Esperanto, so the -o- may be safely dropped from velŝipo.
- when the two consonants would be the same, as in vivovespero (the evening of life). This reflects the general lack of geminate consonants in Esperanto. However, epenthetic vowels are never used with affixes or prepositions, so double consonants are found in such cases, as in mallonga (short).
- when the first element was very short and might not otherwise be recognized, as in diosimila (godlike).
- when the compound would otherwise be homonymous with an existing word, as in konkoludo (shell game); cf. konkludo (conclusion).

=== Reduplication ===
Reduplication is only marginally used in Esperanto. It has an intensifying effect similar to that of the suffix -eg-. The common examples are plenplena (chock-full), from plena (full), finfine (finally, at last), from fina (final), and fojfoje (once in a while), from foje (once, sometimes). Reduplication is only used with monosyllabic roots that do not require an epenthetic vowel when compounded.

=== Some examples ===
amantino (a [female] lover)
aminda (lovable)
amema (loving)
malameti (to feel distaste for)

esperiga (hopeful [of a situation: inspiring hope])
esperema (hopeful [of a person: tending to hope])
Esperantujo (the Esperanto community)
Esperantaĉo (broken Esperanto)

Affixes may be used in novel ways, creating new words that don't exist in any national language. Sometimes the results are poetic: In one Esperanto novel, a man opens an old book with a broken spine, and the yellowed pages disliberiĝas [from the root libera (free) and the affixes dis- and -iĝ-]. There is no equivalent way to express this in English, but it creates a very strong visual image of the pages escaping the book and scattering over the floor. More importantly, the word is comprehensible the first time one hears it.

Derivation by affix greatly expands a speaker's vocabulary, sometimes beyond what they know in their native language. For instance, the English word ommatidium (a single lens of a compound eye) is rather obscure, but a child would be able to coin an Esperanto equivalent, okulero, from okulo 'an eye' (or perhaps, more precisely, okularero, by first coining okularo for 'a compound eye'). In this way the Esperanto root vid- (see) regularly corresponds to some two dozen English words: see (saw, seen), sight, blind, vision, visual, visible, nonvisual, invisible, unsightly, glance, view, vista, panorama, observant etc., though there are also separate Esperanto roots for some of these concepts.

In the Fundamento, Zamenhof illustrated word formation by deriving the equivalents of recuperate, disease, hospital, germ, patient, doctor, medicine, pharmacy, etc. from sana (healthy). Not all of the resulting words translate well into English, in many cases because they distinguish fine shades of meaning that English lacks: sano, sana, sane, sani, sanu, saniga, saneco, sanilo, sanigi, saniĝi, sanejo, sanisto, sanulo, malsano, malsana, malsane, malsani, malsanulo, malsaniga, malsaniĝi, malsaneta, malsanema, malsanulejo, malsanulisto, malsanero, malsaneraro, sanigebla, sanigisto, sanigilo, resanigi, resaniĝanto, sanigilejo, sanigejo, malsanemulo, sanilaro, malsanaro, malsanulido, nesana, malsanado, sanulaĵo, malsaneco, malsanemeco, saniginda, sanilujo, sanigilujo, remalsano, remalsaniĝo, malsanulino, sanigista, sanigilista, sanilista, malsanulista. Perhaps half of these words are in common use, but the others (and more) are available if needed.

== Correlatives ==
The correlatives are a paradigm of pro-forms, used to ask and answer the questions what, where, when, why, who, whose, how, how much, and what kind. They are constructed from set elements so that correlatives with similar meanings have similar forms: There are nine endings corresponding to the nine wh- questions, and five initial elements that perform the functions of asking, answering, denying, being inclusive, and being indefinite about these nine questions. For example, the words kiam (when) and kiu (who, which), with the initial ki- of questions, ask about time and individuals, whereas the tiam (then) and tiu (this/that one), with the same endings but the initial ti- of demonstratives, answer those questions, and the words neniam (never) neniu (no-one) deny those questions. Thus by learning these 14 elements the speaker acquires a paradigm of 45 adverbs and pronouns.

The correlatives beginning ti- correspond to the English demonstratives in th- (this, thus, then, there etc.), whereas ĉi- corresponds to every- and i- to some-. The correlatives beginning with ki- have a double function, as interrogative and relative pronouns and adverbs, just as the wh- words do in English: Kiu ĉevalo? (Which horse?); La ĉevalo, kiu forkuris (The horse that ran away).

The adjectival determiners ending in -u have the usual dual function of adjectives: standing alone as proforms, as in ĉiu (everyone); and modifying a noun, as in ĉiu tago (every day). Those ending in -io are exclusively used standing alone: ĉio (everything).

The correlatives have a genitive case ending in -es. Therefore, the adjectival correlatives, ending in -ia and -iu, do not play that role, as adjectival personal pronouns such as mia ("my") do. However, adjectival correlatives do agree in number and case with the nouns they modify, as any other adjectives: La ĉevaloj, kiujn mi vidis (The horses which I saw). They, as well as the independent determiners ending in -io, also take the accusative case when standing in for the object of a clause. The accusative of motion is used with the place correlatives in -ie, forming -ien (hither, whither, thither, etc.).

=== Table of correlatives ===
		Question ("What")	Indication ("This/that")	Indefinite ("Some")	Universal ("Each, every")	Negative ("No")
		ki–	ti–	i–	ĉi–	neni–
Quality	–a	kia (what kind/sort/type of)	tia (such a)	ia (some kind/sort/type of)	ĉia (every kind/sort/type of)	nenia (no kind/sort/type of)
Reason	–al	kial (why)	tial (for that reason, therefore)	ial (for some reason)	ĉial (for all reasons)	nenial (for no reason)
Time	–am	kiam (when)	tiam (then)	iam (sometime)	ĉiam (always)	neniam (never)
Place	–e	kie (where)	tie (there)	ie (somewhere)	ĉie (everywhere)	nenie (nowhere)
Manner	–el	kiel (how, as)	tiel (thus, as)	iel (somehow)	ĉiel (in every way)	neniel (no-how, in no way)
Association	–es	kies (whose)	ties (this/that one's)	ies (someone's)	ĉies (everyone's)	nenies (no one's)
Thing	–o	kio (what)	tio (this/that)	io (something)	ĉio (everything)	nenio (nothing)
Amount	–om	kiom (how much)	tiom (that much)	iom (some, a bit)	ĉiom (all of it)	neniom (none)
Individual	–u	kiu (who, which one; which [horse])	tiu (that one; that [horse])	iu (someone; some [horse])	ĉiu (everyone; each [horse], all [horses])	neniu (no one; no [horse])

=== Correlative particles ===
Several adverbial particles are used primarily with the correlatives: ajn indicates generality, ĉi indicates proximity, and for indicates distance. (Without these particles, demonstratives such as tiu and tio are not specific about distance, though they are usually translated as "that".)

kio ajn (whatever)
io ajn (anything)
tio (that [general]) [cannot modify a noun]
tiu (that one) [can modify a noun: tiu knabo (that boy)]
tiuj (those)
tiu ĉi (this one)
tiu for (that one yonder)
tien ĉi (hither [to here])
ĉiu hundo (each/every dog)
ĉiuj hundoj (all dogs)
ĉi ĉiuj hundoj (all these dogs)

=== An extension of the original paradigm ===
Sometimes the correlative system is extended to the root ali- (other), at least when the resulting word is unambiguous,

aliel (in another way), alies (someone else's).

Alie, however, would be ambiguous as to whether the original meaning "otherwise" or the correlative "elsewhere" were intended, so aliloke (from loko "place") is used for "elsewhere".

As a practical matter, only aliel and alies are seen with any frequency, and even they are condemned by many speakers.

=== Interrogative vs relative pronouns ===
Examples of the interrogative versus relative uses of the ki- words:

Kiu ŝtelis mian ringon? (Who stole my ring?)
La polico ne kaptis la ŝtelistojn, kiuj ŝtelis mian ringon. (The police haven't caught the thieves who_{[plural]} stole my ring.)

Kiel vi faris tion? (How did you do that?)
Mi ne scias, kiel fari tion. (I don't know how to do that.)

Also,

Kia viro li estas? (What kind of man is he?)
Kia viro! (What a man!)

Note that standard Esperanto punctuation puts a comma before the relative word (a correlative in ki- or the conjunction ke, "that"), a feature common to many Slavic languages.

=== Derivatives ===
Various parts of speech may be derived from the correlatives, just as from any other roots: ĉiama (eternal), ĉiea (ubiquitous), tiama (contemporary), kialo (a reason), iomete (a little bit), kioma etaĝo? (which floor?) [This last requests an ordinal answer of how many floors up, like la dek-sesa (the 16th), rather than asking someone to simply point out which floor, which would be asked with kiu etaĝo?. The same form is used for asking time: Kioma horo estas?, literally "How-manyeth hour is it?"]

Although the initial and final elements of the correlatives are not roots or affixes, in that they cannot normally be independently combined with other words (for instance, there is no genitive case in -es for nouns), the initial element of the neni- correlatives is an exception, as seen in neniulo (a nobody), from neni- plus -ulo, or neniigi, to nullify or destroy, from neni- plus the causative -ig-.

== Gender ==
Usually, feminine nouns are derived from epicene (genderless) roots via the suffix -ino. A relatively small number of Esperanto roots are semantically masculine or feminine. In some but not all cases, masculine roots also have feminine derivatives via -ino. Usage is consistent for only a few dozen words. For others, people may differ in usage, or it may be difficult to tell whether a word is gendered because of social custom or because of the word itself.

=== Masculine roots ===
A small (and decreasing) number of noun roots, mostly titles and kinship terms, are inherently masculine unless the feminine suffix -ino or the inclusive prefix ge- are added. For example, there are patro (father), patrino (mother), and gepatroj (parents), whereas there is no proper word for parent in the singular (as explained below). Some words, such as papo (pope), are masculine in practice, but they are not inherently masculine and a feminine referent could be used in fiction or if customs change.

==== The original setup ====
In the early twentieth century, members of a profession were assumed to be masculine unless specified otherwise with -ino, reflecting the expectations of most industrial societies. That is, sekretario was a male secretary, and instruisto was a male teacher. This was the case for all words ending in -isto, as well as -ulo (riĉulo "a rich man"), -ano and ethnicities (kristano "a male Christian", anglo "an Englishman"), -estro (urbestro "a male mayor"), and the participles -into, -anto, -onto, -ito, -ato, -oto (komencanto "a male beginner"). Many domestic animals were also masculine (bovo "bull", kapro "billygoat", koko "rooster"). These generally became gender-neutral over the course of the century, as many similar words did in English, because of social transformation.

Once such a word is used ambiguously by a significant number of speakers or writers, it can no longer be assumed to be masculine. Language guides suggest using all ambiguous words neutrally, and many people find this the least confusing approach—and so the ranks of masculine words gradually dwindle.

==== The current situation ====
There is still variation in many of the above words, depending on the social expectations and language background of the speaker. Many of the words are not clearly either masculine or epicene today. For example, the plural bovoj is generally understood to mean "cattle", not "bulls", and similarly the plurals angloj (Englishpeople) and komencantoj (beginners); but a masculine meaning reappears in bovo kaj bovino "a bull & cow", anglo kaj anglino (an Englishman & Englishwoman), komencanto kaj komencantino (a male & female beginner).

There are several dozen clearly masculine roots:

Words for boys and men: fraŭlo (bachelor – the feminine fraŭlino is used for 'miss'), knabo (boy), viro (man).
Kinship terms: avo (grandfather), edzo (husband), fianĉo (fiance), filo (son), frato (brother), kuzo (cousin), nepo (grandson), nevo (nephew), onklo (uncle), patro (father), vidvo (widower), but not orfo (orphan) or parenco (relative).
Titles of nobility that have feminine equivalents: barono (baron), caro (czar), grafo (count), kavaliro (knight), princo (prince), reĝo (king), sinjoro (lord, sir), but not generic nobelo (noble) or monarĥo (monarch). Many non-European titles, such as ŝaho (shah) and mikado (mikado), are considered masculine because there are no female examples (there is no "ŝahino" or "mikadino"), but like 'pope' above, this is subject to circumstance. For example, though faraono (pharaoh) may be said to be masculine, Hatshepsut is described not only as a faraonino but as a female faraono.
Religious orders that have feminine equivalents: abato (abbot), monaĥo (monk). Others, such as rabeno (rabbi), do not occur in the feminine but, like papo (pope), that is a matter of custom rather than language.
Male mythological figures: ciklopoj (cyclopes), leprekono (leprechaun), etc. These do not take the suffix -ino. There are relatively few mythological terms that can only be masculine. Inkubo (incubus), for example, is prototypically masculine, but the feminine inkubino is found as an alternative to sukubo (succubus).
Dedicated masculine words for domestic animals that have a separate epicene root: boko (buck), stalono (stallion), taŭro (bull). These do not take the suffix -ino.
Words for castrated beings: eŭnuko (eunuch), kapono (castrated rooster), okso (castrated bull). These do not take the suffix -ino.
A word for male: masklo.

Some of these, such as masklo and the dedicated words for male animals, are fundamentally masculine and are never used with the feminine suffix. The others remain masculine mainly because Zamenhof did not establish a way to derive masculine words the way he did for feminine words. To partially remedy this, the root vir (man) has long been used to form the masculine of animal words. Originally a suffix, since the 1926 publication of the Esperanto translation of the Bible it has shifted in use to a prefix, but either way the resulting words are ambiguous. Bovoviro "bovine-man" and virbovo "man-bovine", for example, could mean either "minotaur" or "bull", and therefore both taŭro (bull) and minotaŭro (minotaur) have been borrowed into the language to disambiguate. Adjectival usage of vira is also found, but is similarly ambiguous. More recently, the word maskla (masculine) was created as an unambiguous alternative, while others use the unofficial suffix -iĉo.

=== Feminine roots ===
There are several dozen feminine roots that do not normally take the feminine suffix -ino:

Words for women: damo (lady), matrono (matron), megero (shrew/bitch, from mythology);
Female professions: almeo (almah), gejŝo (geisha), hetajro (concubine), meretrico (prostitute), odalisko (odalisque), primadono (prima donna), subreto (soubrette);
Female mythological figures: amazono (Amazon), furio (Fury), muzo (Muse), nimfo (nymph), sireno (siren), etc.
Special words for female domestic animals: guno (heifer)
Spayed animals: pulardo (poulard)
Words for female: ino, femalo.

Like the essentially masculine roots (those that do not take the feminine suffix), feminine roots are rarely interpreted as epicene. However, many of them are feminine because of social custom or the details of their mythology, and there is nothing preventing masculine usage in fiction. Even outside of fiction, words such as muzo (muse) nimfo (nymph) may be used metaphorically for males, and a collection of Goethe's poetry has been translated under the title La Muzino ('The [female] Muse'), with gendered metaphorical usage. Similarly, sireno is also the biological name for sea-cows (Latin Sirenia), and as such one can speak of sirenino (a female sea-cow).

=== Feminine personal names ===
The ending of all assimilated nouns in Esperanto with -o, including personal names, clashes with Romance languages such as Italian and Spanish, in which -o marks masculine names, and feminine names end in -a. For example, the fully Esperantized form of 'Mary' is Mario, which resembles Spanish masculine Mario rather than feminine María. (Though suffixed Mariino is also available, it is seldom seen.) This has resulted in some writers using a final -a for feminine names with cognates in Romance languages, such as Johano "John" vs. Johana "Joanna", rather than using the feminine suffix -in for a more fully assimilated Johano and Johanino, or Jozefo "Joseph" and Jozefino "Josephine". Some writers extend this -a convention to all female names, though there is no such gender in Esperanto grammar.

=== Gendered pronouns ===
Esperanto personal pronouns distinguish gender in the third-person singular: li (he), ŝi (she); but not in the plural: ili (they). There are two practical epicene third-person singular pronouns: expanding the use of the demonstrative pronoun tiu (that one), and ĝi (Zamenhof's suggestion).

== Antonyms ==
People sometimes object to using the prefix mal- to derive highly frequent antonyms, especially when they are as long as malproksima (far). There are a few alternative roots in poetry, such as turpa for malbelega (very ugly) and pigra for mallaborema (lazy) – some of which originated in Ido – that find their way into prose. However, they are rarely used in conversation. This is a combination of two factors: the great ease and familiarity of using the mal- prefix, and the relative obscurity of most of the alternatives, which would hamper communication. This results in English borrowings – such as ĉipa (cheap) for malmultekosta (inexpensive) – failing to find favor even among native English speakers.

Two root antonyms are frequently encountered: eta (little), and dura (hard [not soft]). However, their popularity is due to their iconicity. Eta is derived from the diminutive suffix and more properly means slight, but it's a short word, and its use for malgranda (little) is quite common. The reason for the popularity of dura may be similar: perhaps official malmola, with the repeated continuants m_l, sounds too soft to mean "hard", while dura begins with a stop consonant. Other antonymic words tend to have a different scope. For example, instead of malbona (bad) we may see aĉa (of poor quality) or fia (shameful), but these are not strict antonyms.

The antonymic prefix is highly productive among native-speaking children.

== Proper names ==
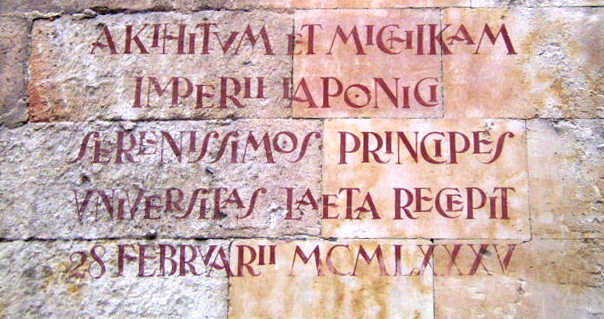
The Japanese names "Akihito and Michiko" inflected in Latin as Akihitum et Michikam. Final vowels are often similarly changed to the inflectional suffix -o, -on in Esperanto.

Proper names may either be

- translated into Esperanto: Johano "John"
- fully assimilated (respelled in the Esperanto alphabet and given the inflectional suffix -o of nouns). These can then be inflected like normal Esperanto nouns:
  - Rozevelto "Roosevelt"
  - la Rozeveltoj "the Roosevelts"
  - in accusative case: Nun mi priskribos Rozevelton "Now I will describe Roosevelt."
  - changed to another part of speech: la Rozevelta domego "the Roosevelt mansion"
  - combined with other roots and affixes: Rozeveltidoj "descendants of the Roosevelts"
- partially assimilated, i.e. respelled only: Kandaliza Rajs "Condoleezza Rice", or
- left in the original orthography: Zamenhof.

The last method is usually used only for names or transliterations of names in Latin script. As noted under Gender, feminine personal names may take the suffix a rather than o even when fully assimilated.

When a name ending in a vowel is fully assimilated, the vowel is often changed to inflectional o, rather than the o being added to the full root. As with borrowed common nouns, this may be criticized if the vowel is part of the root rather than inflectional in the source language, because the resulting form may not be readily recognized by native speakers of the source language. However, it is a common phenomenon in inflectional languages such as Russian or Latin. If a name is not fully assimilated, the accusative case may be tacked on with a hyphen, as -n if the name ends in a vowel, or as -on if it does not (Zamenhof-on).

== Idioms and slang ==
Some idiomatic expressions have either been borrowed from Esperanto's source languages, or developed naturally over the course of Esperanto's history. There are also various expletives based on body functions and religion, as in English.

=== Idioms ===
In addition to the root words and the rules for combining them, a learner of Esperanto must learn some idiomatic compounds that are not entirely straightforward. For example, eldoni, literally "to give out", means "to publish"; a vortaro, literally "a compilation of words", means "a glossary" or "a dictionary"; and necesejo, literally "a place for necessities", is a toilet. Almost all of these compounds, however, are modeled after equivalent compounds in native European languages: eldoni after the German herausgeben or Russian издавать, and vortaro from the Russian словарь slovar'.

=== Contractions ===
Saluton (hello) is sometimes clipped to sal or even sa, and saluĝis (from saluton – ĝis la revido) is seen as a quick hello–goodbye on internet chatrooms. Similarly:

espo (Esperanto)
kaŭ (from kaj/aŭ 'and/or')
ŝli (from li/ŝi 'he/she' and ŝ/li 's/he')
'stas (from estas 'is, are, am')

In the contraction 'stas the stress shifts to the temporal suffix, which makes the tenses easier to distinguish than they are in formal estas, and effectively recapturing some of the stress patterns of Proto-Esperanto (see below).

=== Word play ===
Sometimes Esperanto derivational morphology is used to create humorous alternatives to existing roots. For instance, with the antonym prefix mal-, one gets,

maltrinki (from trinki to drink, so "to undrink") to urinate (normally urini)
malmanĝi (from manĝi to eat, so "to uneat") to vomit (normally vomi).

As in English, some slang is intentionally offensive, such as substituting the suffix -ingo (a sheath) for the feminine -ino in virino (a woman), for viringo, meaning a woman as a receptacle for a man. However, such terms are usually coined to translate from other languages, and are rarely heard in conversation.

=== Cultural "in" words ===
Esperanto has some slang in the sense of in-group talk as well. Some of this is borrowed; for example, fajfi pri io (to whistle about something) means not to care about it, as in German. Other expressions deriving from Esperanto history or dealing with specifically Esperantist concerns have arisen over the years. A volapukaĵo, for example, is something needlessly incomprehensible, derived from the name of the more complex and less immediately readable constructed language Volapük, which preceded Esperanto by a few years.

Words and phrases reflect what speakers of a language talk about. Tellingly, Esperanto has a slang expression krokodili (to crocodile) for speaking a language other than Esperanto when Esperanto would be more appropriate, such as at an Esperanto convention, whereas there is nothing equivalent in English.

=== Jargon ===
Technical jargon exists in Esperanto as it does in English, and this is a major source of debate in the language: whether international jargon should be borrowed into Esperanto, or whether more transparent equivalents should be constructed from existing roots.

However, the normal wordplay people use for amusement is occasionally carried to the extreme of being jargon. One such style is called Esperant’, found in chat rooms and occasionally used at Esperanto conventions. (See Esperantido.)

=== Artificial variants ===
One line of verse, taken from the sole surviving example of the original Lingwe uniwersala of 1878, is used idiomatically:

jam temp' está (it's time).

If this stage of Esperanto had been preserved, it would presumably be used to occasionally give a novel the archaic flavor that Latin provides in the modern European languages.

Various approaches have been taken to represent deviant language in Esperanto literature. One play, for example, originally written in two dialects of Italian, was translated with Esperanto representing one dialect, and Ido representing the other. Other approaches are to attempt to reconstruct proto-Esperanto, and to create de novo variants of the language.

==== Reconstructions ====
With so little data available, various attempts have been made to reconstruct what proto-Esperanto may have been like. However, these reconstructions rely heavily on material from the intermediate period of Esperanto development, between the original Lingwe Uniwersala of 1878 and the Unua Libro of 1887. (See Proto-Esperanto.)

==== De novo creations ====
There are various "dialects" and pseudo-historical forms that have been created for literary uses in Esperanto. Two of the more notable are a substandard jargon, Popido, and a fictitious "archaic" version of Esperanto called Arcaicam Esperantom. Neither are used in conversation. (See Esperantido.)

== False friends ==
Because Esperanto vocabulary is largely international, it shares many cognates with English. However, because they were often taken from languages other than English, these do not always have their English meanings. Some of the mismatches are:

domaĝi (to spare), vs. difekti (to damage)
embarasi (to jam, obstruct), vs. hontigi (to embarrass)
aktuala (current, up-to-date), vs. efektiva (actual), vs. efika (effective)
eventuala (contingent), vs. rezulta (eventual)
akurata (punctual, on-time), vs. preciza (accurate)
kontroli (to check, keep track of), vs. regi (to control)
konvena (suitable), vs. oportuna (convenient)
rento (dividend income), vs. lupago (rent)
paragrafo (section), vs. alineo (paragraph)

== Dictionaries ==
La Plena Ilustrita Vortaro de Esperanto (English: The Complete Illustrated Dictionary of Esperanto, abbreviated PIV) is the largest monolingual dictionary of the language and is generally regarded as the standard. However, it is subject to criticism, for example for failure to distinguish rare, idiosyncratic, redundant, or even erroneous words attested in a few written texts from their conversational equivalents, and for giving French approximations of some difficult words rather than their Zamenhofian meanings. The older Plena Vortaro de Esperanto, originally published in 1930 and reissued with an appendix in 1953, is still widely used, as more portable and less expensive than the PIV, and perhaps more accurate, even if somewhat dated. The Etimologia vortaro de Esperanto (five volumes, 1989–2001) gives source-language etymologies of all fundamental and official root words (tentative and uncertain in a few cases), along with comparisons of equivalent words in four other constructed international auxiliary languages.

== See also ==
- Esperanto grammar
- Word derivation by native speakers
- Esperanto lexicographers
- Vortaro de Esperanto
- Special Esperanto adverbs
- Esperanto words with the suffix -um
- Esperanto profanity
