= Esperanto words with the infix -um- =

List of words

Esperanto derivation is for the most part regular and predictable: One can normally understand new words that are built upon known roots, and can create new words on the fly while speaking. However, there is a suffix -um- that has no inherent meaning, but derives words that cannot be readily derived with dedicated affixes. Such derivations must be memorized individually, though because the root already exists, they may be more easily learned than a completely new word. Because of its irregularity and unpredictability, over-use of the suffix -um- is discouraged. Over time substitutes have been developed for some of the original -um- words and new ones have been coined. Regular derivations may in some cases substitute for a word in -um-; in other cases they may be similar but not exact replacements; and in still others, a substitutable word may be considered jargon (like using a catarrh for a cold in English).

== Semi-regular use ==
One area where the derivations is -um- are nearly predictable is in pieces of clothing named after the corresponding parts of the body: kolumo 'collar' (from 'neck'); buŝumo 'muzzle' (from 'mouth'); manumo 'cuff' (from 'hand': does not mean 'glove'); kalkanumo 'heel (of a shoe)'; plandumo 'sole (of a shoe)'; ingvenumo 'jockstrap' (from 'groin'); hufumo 'horseshoe' (from 'hoof'); nazumo 'pince-nez, spectacles' (from 'nose', now uncommon). Many of these are the only word for the concept, though the last two have substitutes: hufofero (lit. 'hoof-iron') and okulvitroj (lit. 'eye-glasses'). (Note however that brakumi from 'arm' does not mean 'sleeve' but 'to embrace'.) In a similar vein, cicumo is a 'nipple (on a bottle)', from '(human) nipple' (body-part extension), and fenestrumo is 'shutter', from 'window' (a covering of a part).

Another predictable set are formed from numbers to indicate numerical bases: duuma 'binary', okuma 'octal', dekuma 'decimal' (dekuma logaritmo 'base-10 logarithm'), dekduuma 'duodecimal', deksesuma 'hexadecimal', dudekuma 'vigesimal', and sesdekuma 'sexagesimal'.

Consciously using the senses is a meaning that is partially predictable, though it only fills in meanings that do not have dedicated roots like 'watch' or 'listen'. These are fingrumi 'to touch/feel/palpate' (from 'finger'); gustumi 'to taste s.t.' (from gusti 'to taste (of food)'); and okulumi 'to make eyes at' (from 'eye'). For the latter, simple okuli is often used, and it has a sexual connotation that is not predictable. The word for the senses is sentumo, from senti 'to feel'.

Forms of execution also take -um-: krucumi 'to crucify', pendumi 'to hang', gasumi 'to gas', ŝtonumi 'to stone', dekumi, kvaronumi 'to quarter', palisumi 'to impale', radumi 'to break on the wheel'. Substitute forms with -mortigi 'to kill' are nearly as common: krucmortigi, ŝtonmortigi, etc.

A recent innovation is to spend time doing something, especially for pleasure. Butikumi (from butiko 'a shop') means 'to go shopping', and tends to be used in the sense of shopping for pleasure. Similarly, amikumi means 'to pass time with one's friends'; esperantumi 'to spend time using Esperanto'; kafumi 'to have a cup of coffee', retumi 'to surf the Web' (from reto 'net, Internet'), and urbumi 'to go into town' (from urbo 'town, city'). These latter words are not yet in dictionaries.

== List of derivations ==
The following is a fairly complete list of words with a reasonable degree of acceptance and that have not been covered above.

Root	meaning	-um- form	meaning	substitute
aero	air	aerumi	to aerate	≈ ventoli to ventilate
alfabeto	alphabet	alfabetumo	alphabet book, abecedary	alfabetlibro; ≈ aboco ABCs,
aminda	lovable	amindumi	to court, to woo	≈ koketi to flirt
brako	an arm	brakumi	to embrace, to hug	enbrakigi to take in one's arms, ĉirkaŭbraki
bruli	to burn (v.i.)	brulumo	inflammation	
cerbo	brain	cerbumi	to brood over, to rack one's brains	≈ (pri)pensegi (augmentative of pensi 'to think' or pripensi 'to consider')
ĉaro	a cart	ĉarumo	a wheelbarrow	
dekstra	right (vs. left)	dekstruma	clockwise	
faldi	to fold	faldumi	to pleat	
folio	a leaf	foliumi	to leaf through	
fumi	to emit smoke	fumumi	to smoke a pipe, cigarette, etc.	fumi (fumaĵi is to smoke fish, meat, etc.)
gliti	to glide	glitumi	to iceskate	glitkuri (with kuri 'to run')
komuna	in common	komunumo	a community	
korto	a court(yard)	kortumo	an appellate court	juĝejo (juĝ-ejo) is a court in general
litero	a letter (of the alphabet)	literumi	to spell	ortografii (from 'orthography')
loko	a place	lokumi	to place under the care of someone (child in a school, money in a bank, etc.)	loki (extended sense)
loti	to draw lots	lotumi	to allot	priloti
malvarma	cold (temperature)	malvarmumo	a cold (illness)	kataro (katar-o) catarrh
mastro	a master	mastrumi	to manage the economy of a home	
mondo	world	mondumo	high society	
muso	a mouse	musumi	to use a computer mouse, to cut & paste	
ombro	a shadow	ombrumi	to shade (in painting or drawing)	
ondo	a wave	ondumi	to corrugate, to make (hair) wavy	
operacio	an operation	operaciumo	operating system (such as Unix)	mastruma sistemo (technically only part of the operaciumo)
palpebro	an eyelid	palpebrumi	to blink	
plena	full	plenumi	to accomplish, to fulfill	≈ plenigi to make full
postaĵo	a posterior, a rear end	postaĵumi	to moon	
proksima	near	proksimume	approximately	
propra	one's own	proprumi	to own	≈ havi to have
rapido	speed	rapidumo	a speed/gear (of a vehicle)	rapido is sometimes used imprecisely for this
rento	the return on an investment	rentumo	the interest charged for credit	interezo (neologism)
respondi	to answer	respondumi	to be responsible for	prirespondi 'to answer for', responsi (neologism)
ruli	to roll	rulumi	to scroll	
sapo	soap	sapumi	to lather up	≈ sapi to soap
sekso	sex	seksumi	to have sex	sekskuniĝi (seks-kun-iĝi) to join sexually, koiti to have coitus, amori to make love
senti	to feel	sentumo	one of the five senses	senso (neologism)
stulta	stupid	stultumi	to play the fool, to be purposefully obtuse	
tendo	a tent	tendumi	to camp (with tents)	≈ bivaki to bivouac (without tents)
vento	a wind	ventumi	to fan	
-	-	umo	something whose name is unknown or forgotten	

== See also ==
- The infix -um- at Wiktionary
- Special Esperanto adverbs, including those with the ad hoc part-of-speech suffix -aŭ
