= Gaku Konishi =

Japanese physics professor (1934–2018)

Gaku Konishi (小西 岳, Konishi Gaku) (1934 in Minoh, Osaka – 17 January 2018) was a Japanese physics professor at Kwansei Gakuin University and an Esperantist.

== Esperanto movement ==
Konishi was a committed Esperantist who first began learning Esperanto in 1948, at the age of 13. Within the Esperanto movement he was active in the antinationalist SAT association and in the Kansai League of Esperanto Groups, the second-largest Japanese Esperanto federation. He was formerly a member of the Academy of Esperanto and a Japanese Esperanto Institute councillor.

Konishi translated extensively from Japanese into Esperanto, including prose works like Yasunari Kawabata's Snow Country (雪国, Yukiguni, Esperanto title "La Neĝa Lando") and of Kenji Miyazawa's Night on the Galactic Railroad (銀河鉄道の夜, Ginga Tetsudō no Yoru, Esperanto title "Nokto de la galaksia fervojo"), etc. He translated many songs, compiled songbooks and composed original songs, melodies and poetry. He also wrote original works in Esperanto. A collection of his science fiction works appeared in 1976 under the title Vage tra la dimensioj (次元の間をさまよって, "Rambling through the dimensions").

He also wrote textbooks, was chief editor of Nova Esperanto-Japana Vortaro, an Esperanto-Japanese dictionary published by the Japanese Esperanto Institute, and was active in many other areas. He wrote in Japanese about Esperanto grammar and contributed to the propagation of the Esperanto movement by copy-editing its book and magazine articles for correct grammar.

== Awards ==
For his science fiction novel La kosmoŝipo Edeno n-ro 5 ("Spaceship Eden No. 5") he was awarded an honourable mention in the prose category at the 1965 Belartaj Konkursoj, the Esperanto movement's annual fine arts competition. In October 2000 the Japanese Esperanto Congress bestowed the Premio Ossaka on Konishi, in recognition of "his outstanding translations of Japanese belles-lettres and songs into Esperanto." Given in memory of Kenji Osaka (1888-1969), father of the Japanese Esperanto movement, the Premio Ossaka is the most prestigious adjudicated award for Esperantists in Japan.

At the opening of the 2007 World Congress of Esperanto in Yokohama he was elected an honorary member of the Universal Esperanto Association (UEA)

== Other works ==
=== Original Esperanto writings ===
- Promenado en gramatiko. Esperanto grammar in Japanese medium. JELK, Osaka: 1986. 104 pages.
- Pado de Gramatiko, primer, anthology and grammar.
- Songbooks Venu amikoj ("Come, friends") and Kantoj karmemoraj ("Songs to remember loved ones").

=== Translations into Esperanto ===
- La ĝemelaj steloj ("Twin stars and other stories of Kenji Miyazawa")
- Notoj de la delto (デルタの記, "Notes from the delta"), reportage on the nuclear bombing of the city of Hiroshima
- La ĉevalo de Motizuki ("Motizuki's horse"), choral suite from Katuiti Honda's Vilaĝo en batalkampo (戦場の村, "Village in a battlefield"), reportage of the Vietnam War
- contributing translator and editor of the photojournalism book Hiroshima-Nagasaki about the two cities destroyed by nuclear bombs.
- La edzino de kuracisto Hanaoka Seisyû (English title, "The Doctor's Wife") by Sawako Ariyoshi, Japana Esperanto-Instituto, Tokyo: 2008, 157pp. ISBN 978-4-88887-056-6

=== Translation of Japanese literature ===
- "Dancistino de Izu" (伊豆の踊り子, "The Izu Dancer"), by Yasunari Kawabata
- El Japana Literaturo (日本文学選集, "Anthology of Japanese Literature")
- "La Tombo de Lampiroj" (火垂るの墓, Grave of the Fireflies) by Akiyuki Nosaka
- Postmilita Japana Antologio (戦後日本文学選集, "Postwar Japanese Anthology")
