= Fernando de Diego =

Spanish journalist and linguist

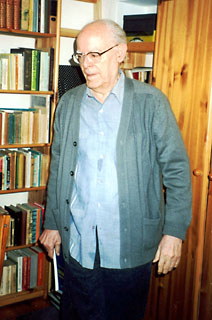
Fernando de Diego, Spanish journalist and linguist (1919–2005)

Fernando de Diego (1919–2005) was a Spanish journalist and linguist.

== Translated works ==
- The land of Alvargonzález of Antonio Machado (1969)
- Gypsy Ballads of Federico Garcia Lorca (1971)
- Rhymes Gustavo Adolfo Becquer (1972)
- The tree of the knowledge of John Doe (1973)
- Doña Bárbara by Rómulo Gallegos (1975)
- The Ingenious Hidalgo Don Quixote of La Mancha by Miguel de Cervantes (1977), released in full version by Esperanto Foundation
- Iron bars Incarnation Ferré (1983)
- Retrincos of Castelao (1983)
- The Family of Pascual Duarte de Camilo Jose Cela (1985)
- One Hundred Years of Solitude by Gabriel García Márquez (1992)
- The evil Carabel of Wenceslao Fernández Flórez (1993)
- Tirano Banderas of Ramón María del Valle-Inclan (1993)
- Agriculture in the tropics of Andrés Bello (1995)
- Twenty Love Poems and a Song of Despair, by Pablo Neruda (1997)

Other translations have been published in anthologies:

- Astura bukedo, an anthology of works by Asturias (1987)
- Sentempa simfonio, anthology of Spanish poetry of all time (1987)
