= Moncontour, Côtes-d'Armor =

Moncontour Monkontour
- Commune
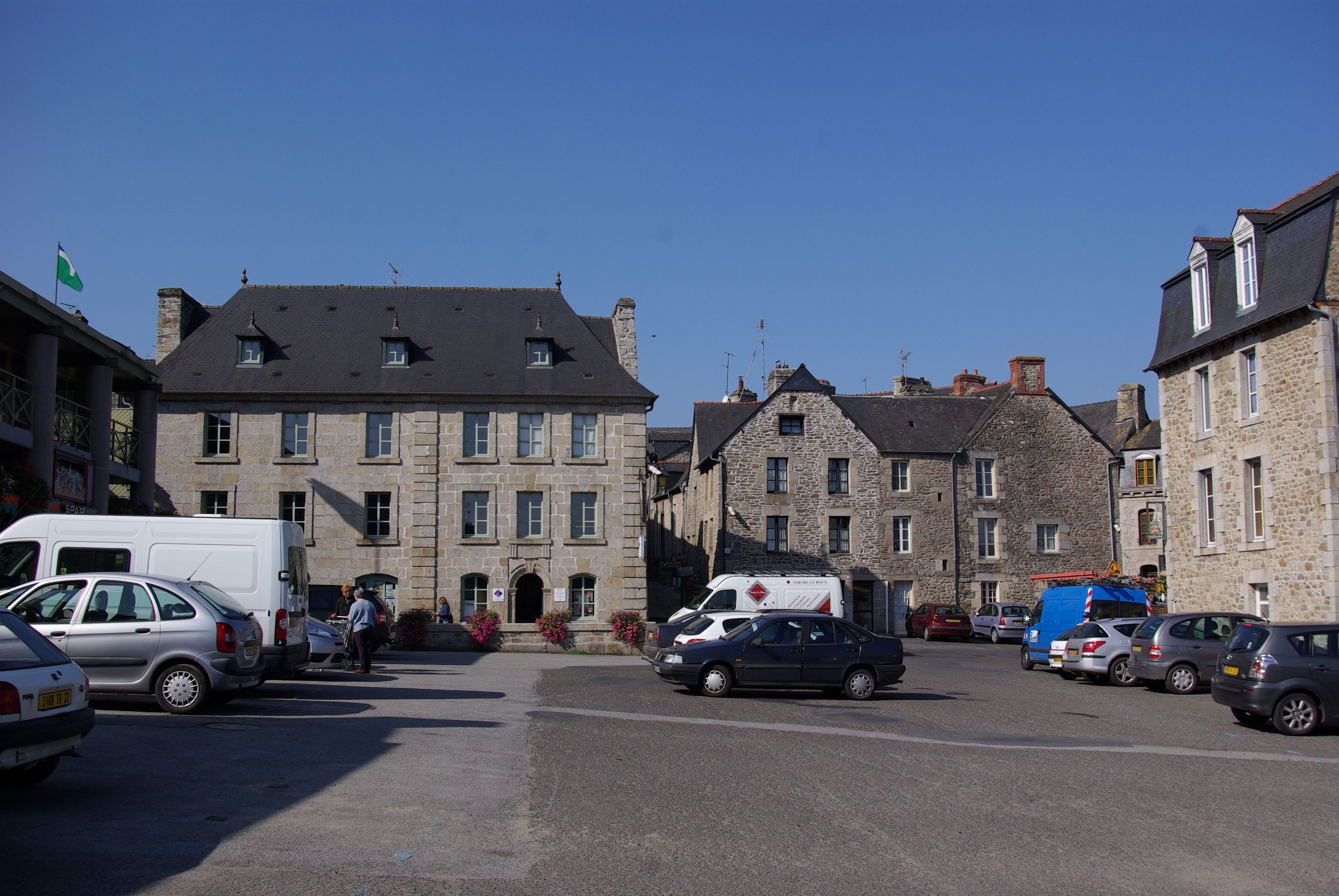
- The Place de la Carrière in the centre of Moncontour, with the tourist office

- Coat of arms
- Location of Moncontour
- Location within France Location within Brittany
- Coordinates: 48°21′36″N 2°37′55″W
- Country: France
- Region: Brittany
- Department: Côtes-d'Armor
- Arrondissement: Saint-Brieuc
- Canton: Plaintel
- Intercommunality: CA Lamballe Terre et Mer

Government
  - Mayor (2020–2026): Anne-Gaud Millorit
- Area^{1}: 0.48 km^{2} (0.19 sq mi)
- Highest elevation: 182 m (597 ft)
- Lowest elevation: 98 m (322 ft)
- Population (2023): 738
  - Density: 1,500/km^{2} (4,000/sq mi)
- Time zone: UTC+01:00 (CET)
  - Summer (DST): UTC+02:00 (CEST)
- INSEE/Postal code: 22153 /22510
- ^{1} French Land Register data, which excludes lakes, ponds, glaciers > 1 km^{2} (0.386 sq mi or 247 acres) and river estuaries.

Moncontour (French pronunciation: [mɔ̃kɔ̃tuʁ]; Breton: Monkontour) is a commune in the Côtes-d'Armor department of Brittany in northwestern France. The 18th-century French economist Joachim Faiguet de Villeneuve (1703–1781) was born in Moncontour. It is one of Les Plus Beaux Villages de France.

== Population ==
Historical population
Year	Pop.	±% p.a.
1968	1,187	—
1975	1,149	−0.46%
1982	1,014	−1.77%
1990	901	−1.47%
1999	865	−0.45%
2007	942	+1.07%
2012	939	−0.06%
2017	867	−1.58%
2023	738	−2.65%
Source: INSEE

Inhabitants of Moncontour are called moncontourais in French.

== See also ==
- Communes of the Côtes-d'Armor department
