= Langue nouvelle =

Sketch for an international auxiliary language from 1765

- Created by: Joachim Faiguet de Villeneuve
- Date: 1765
- Users: None
- Purpose: Constructed language: International auxiliary language; Langue nouvelle
- Sources: based on French

Language codes
- ISO 639-3: None (mis)
- Glottolog: None
- IETF: art-x-nouvelle

Langue nouvelle (French for 'new language') is a grammatical sketch for a proposed artificial international auxiliary language presented in 1765 by Joachim Faiguet de Villeneuve, a French economist, in the ninth volume of Diderot's encyclopedia. It is likely that it influenced Volapük, Esperanto, and other language projects of the 19th century.

== Linguistic properties ==
=== Phonology ===
The phonology is undescribed, except that an "n" may be placed between vowels to avoid hiatus.

The sound inventory can only be deduced from the examples given. Vowels are a e i o ou u; donu 'will give' and donou 'gift' imply a distinction between ou and u, likely /u/ and /y/ respectively (as in French). The vowel of the past tense is sometimes written ⟨é⟩ and sometimes ⟨e⟩, suggesting that the accent is merely a reminder that the letter is not silent, rather than marking a distinct vowel. From sinta 'hundred', cognate with "cent", it would seem that there may be nasalized vowels, for in French the letters ⟨in⟩ represent a nasalized /ɛ/; that is, sinta is presumably to be pronounced [sẽta] or [senta], not *[sinta].

Attested consonants are:

p	t	k
b	d	g
f	s	ch?
v	z	j
m	n
	l	r

It is possible that k, q, c all represent [k]. The only illustrative words are ki, qui 'who, which' and co 'two', which show that k and qu are equivalent before i. However, the lack of a numeral beginning with k, to contrast with co 'two', suggests that k and c are also equivalent, and that co is to be pronounced [ko]. The lack of ch [ʃ], as well as the few other consonants found in French, may merely be an accidental omission due to the small sample of vocabulary.

=== Verbs and pronouns ===
Verbs inflect only for tense and aspect: Indicative present in -a, future -u, past (imparfait) -e (-é), present perfect (parfait) -i, past perfect -o. The subjunctive is formed by adding -r to the indicative: -ar, -ur, -er, -ir, -or; the infinitive by adding -s: -as, -us, -es, -is, -os. The present participle is in -ont.

The present doubles as the imperative and, with the help of the verb sa 'to be', as the passive. The present subjunctive -ar may be used for the imperative as well. Questions are formed by inverting the pronoun and the verb, as in French.

Person is indicated by pronouns: jo (I), to (you singular, thou), lo (he, she, it), no (we), vo (you plural, ye), zo (they), and the reflexive so (oneself). Possessive forms are me, te, se, noti, voti, se. Demonstratives, soli (this) and sola (that), take plural -s (these, those). Who, what, which is ki.

Some conjugations

sas (to be), sis (to have been), sus (to be about to be)
sont (being)
jo sa (I am), to se (you were), lo si (s/he had been), no so (we had been), vo su (you all will be)
zo sar (that they be), jo ser (that I were), to sir (may you have been), lo sor (that s/he had been), no sar (let's be)

jo dona (I give), to done (you gave), lo doni (s/he has given), no dono (we had given), vo donu (you all will give)
zo donar (may they give), dona! (give!), done to? (did you give?)
jo sa dona (I am given), to se dona (you were given), lo su dona (s/he will be given)
sa zo dona? (are they given?) sont dona (being given)
donont (giving)

Sofras 'to treat oneself' is given as an example of a reflexive verb; it is not clear if the initial s is a reflexive prefix, as in French s'offrir, or part of the root. It is however invariable: jo sofra (I treat myself), to sofra (you treat yourself), etc.

=== Nouns, prepositions, and adjectives ===
For nouns, there are no cases, genders, or articles. The plural ends in -s, which unlike in French is pronounced. Augmentatives take -le (-lé), diminutives -li:

manou a house, manoule (manoulé) a mansion, manouli a hut;
filo a boy, filole, filoli.

Deverbals end in -ou:

donou a gift (donas to give), vodou will (vodas to want), servou service (servas to serve)

Prepositions are used:

bi manou of the house, bu manou to the house, de manou from the house, po manou through the house

It would seem there is no distinction between adjective and adverb, and adjectives do not agree in number with the noun.

=== Numerals and digits ===
Each numeral starts with a different consonant, and are in alphabet order:

ba one, co two, de three, ga four, ji five, lu six, ma seven, ni eight, pa nine, vu ten, sinta hundred, mila thousand, milo million

Ordinals add -mu: bamu first, comu second.

Numbers are formed by juxtaposing numerals: Twenty-five is covuji (two-ten-five).

The consonants of the numerals one through nine are used as digits (in place of Arabic numerals), with o for zero, so "25" is written ⟨cj⟩ and "100" is written ⟨boo⟩.
