= Special Esperanto adverbs =

A limited number of Esperanto adverbs do not end with the regular adverbial ending -e. Many of them function as more than just adverbs, such as hodiaŭ "today" (noun or adverb) and ankoraŭ "yet" or "still" (conjunction or adverb). Others are part of the correlative system, and will not be repeated here.

The word class "adverb" is not well defined in any language, and it is sometimes difficult to say whether a word is an adverb. The Esperanto suffix -e is restricted to words that are clearly adverbial.

== Adverbs and the suffix -aŭ ==
Alongside dedicated part-of-speech suffixes of Esperanto, such as adverbial -e, adjectival -a, and nominal -o, the language has a grammatically neutral suffix -aŭ that has no defined part of speech. Words ending in -aŭ may be used for multiple grammatical functions. They are typically words whose part of speech is difficult to identify in other languages. The suffix -aŭ is not lexically productive: it is limited to a closed class of only a few words. To specify the part of speech of these words, the dedicated suffixes may be added to the -aŭ. For example, anstataŭ "instead of" (preposition and conjunction) is the base of the adverb anstataŭe "instead", the adjective anstataŭa "interim" or "deputy", the verb anstataŭi "to take the place of", and the noun anstataŭo "replacement" or "substitution". Most -aŭ words have inherent adverbial uses; anstataŭ is one of the few that do not. The adverbial -aŭ words are:

Esperanto	English	parts of speech
almenaŭ	at least	conjunction and adverb
ambaŭ	both	adjective and adverb
ankaŭ	also	adverb
ankoraŭ	still, yet	conjunction and adverb
apenaŭ	barely	adverb
baldaŭ	soon	adverb
ĉirkaŭ	around	preposition and adverb
hieraŭ	yesterday	noun and adverb
hodiaŭ	today	noun and adverb
kvazaŭ	as if	conjunction and adverb
morgaŭ	tomorrow	noun and adverb
preskaŭ	almost	adverb

Because this -aŭ is a suffix, it may be dropped or replaced by a productive grammatical suffix. For example, alongside anstataŭe and anstataŭigi etc. there are anstate, anstatigi etc., and in poetic usage there is anstat' for anstataŭ, but these are rare.

'In 1892 Zamenhof proposed the following change: "Instead of the ending '-aŭ' in various words one can use an apostrophe [e.g. ankor', apen']... This will increase sonorousness, while not introducing any confusion (because '-aŭ' does not belong to the root, but is only a conditional ending, and thus as easy to leave off as the '-o' of the noun)." But this elision of "-aŭ" from adverbs was not put into practice; only in recent years have a few poets attempted to use it in verse.'

"There have already been attempts to use these words in simple adverbial form (morge, apene, anke, ankore, almene, etc.), which would certainly bring along the simple adjectival form (ankora, almena, apena) and the nominal form (hiero, hodio, morgo). These attempts are even officially tolerated by the Academy [since 1910]."

== Bare-root adverbs ==
Other (so-called) adverbs occur as bare roots, without any suffix. Some of these bare-root words are grammatical particles, in which case true adverbs may be derived from them by adding the suffix -e. They are:

Esperanto	English	notes
for	away	cf. the derived adverb fore
jam	already, yet	cf. the derived adverb jame
ĵus	just now	cf. the derived adverb ĵuse
nun	now	noun and adverb; cf. the derived nuno and nune respective forms
nur	only	cf. the derived adverb nure
plej	most	cf. the derived adverb pleje "at most" or "most often"
pli	more	pronoun and adverb; cf. the derived adverb plie
plu	beyond, further	cf. the derived adverb plue
tre	very	No need for added -e due to it ending with -e already
tro	overly, too much	cf. the derived adverb troe; root now used as "an excess"
tuj	at once, immediately	cf. the derived adverb tuje and noun tujo ('instant')

Occasionally grammatically redundant forms such as tree are seen in poetry.

== See also ==
- For a complete list of words ending in -aŭ, see wiktionary:-aŭ.
- Esperanto words with the ad hoc suffix -um
