= Nagako Konishi =

Japanese composer (born 1945)

- Born: 16 September 1945 (age 80); Nagano, Japan
- Other name: 小西 奈雅子
- Occupation: composer

Nagako Konishi (born 16 September 1945) is a Japanese composer.

== Biography ==
She was born in Agematsu, Nagano, and graduated from Tokyo National University of Fine Arts and Music in 1971. She continued her education at the University of California at Berkeley and served as head of the Japan Federation of Women Composers. She won 1st Prize for Composition in the All-Japan Chorus League, 1971.

== Works ==
Selected works include:

- The Memory from the Wind for 2 Recorders (1990)
- For the sea border for solo piano
- Unasaka e for solo piano
- Indigo Sky for organ
- Misty poem for alto flute and harp
- Away the White (1990)
- Edge of Sea (2004)
- Lamentation for clarinet, piano
- Poetry of Autumn
- Ballade “Love of Melfa”
- Robin Hood Fantasy two pianos
- Icicles

== Links ==
- CiNii: Nagako Konishi
