= List of Esperanto organizations =

Organizations promoting the dissemination of Esperanto as an international auxiliary language have historically played a prominent role in assisting individuals affected by war and conflict. During the First World War, the Universal Esperanto Association helped members of the general public stranded in foreign countries, with volunteers delivering private correspondence, tracing missing persons, sending food and medicine, repatriating children, and assisting prisoners of war. During the Second World War, international Esperanto organizations performed a similar function, delivering correspondence, assisting refugees, and reuniting families.

The following is a list of Esperanto organizations affiliated with the Universal Esperanto Association or the World Anational Association, as well as other independent Esperanto-related groups.

== Universal Esperanto Association ==
- Universal Esperanto Association (Universala Esperanto-Asocio, UEA)

=== National associations linked to the UEA ===
==== Africa ====
- Benin: Benin Esperanto Federation (Benina Esperanto-Federacio)
- Burundi: National Esperanto Association of Burundi (ANEB)
- Cameroon: Cameroonian Esperanto Association
- Chad: Chad Esperanto Association (Ĉadia Esperanto-Asocio)
- Côte d'Ivoire: Ivoirian Esperanto Association (Kotdivuara Esperanto-Asocio)
- Democratic Republic of the Congo: Zairian Esperanto Association (Demokratia Kongolanda Esperanto-Asocio)
- Ghana: Ghanaian Esperanto Movement (Ganaa Esperanto-Movado)
- Madagascar: Union of Malagasy Esperantists (Unuiĝo de Malagasaj Esperantistoj)
- Mali: Mali Esperanto Movement (Malia Esperanto-Movado)
- Nigeria: Nigerian Esperanto Federation (Esperanto-Federacio de Niĝerio)
- South Africa: South African Esperanto Association (Esperanto-Asocio de Suda Afriko)
- Tanzania: Tanzanian Esperanto Association (Tanzania Esperanto-Asocio)
- Togo: Togo Union for Esperanto (Unuiĝo Togolanda por Esperanto)
- Zimbabwe: Zimbabwean Esperanto Institute (Zimbabva Esperanto-Instituto)

==== Americas ====
- Argentina: Argentinian Esperanto League (Argentina Esperanto-Ligo)
- Brazil: Brazilian Esperanto League (Brazila Esperanto-Ligo)
- Canada: Canadian Esperanto Association (Kanada Esperanto-Asocio KEA)

- Quebec Esperanto Society (Esperanto-Societo Kebekia)

- Chile: Chilean Esperanto Association (Ĉilia Esperanto-Asocio)
- Colombia: Colombian Esperanto League (Kolombia Esperanto-Ligo KEL)
- Costa Rica: Costa Rican Esperanto Association (Kostarika Esperanto-Asocio)
- Cuba: Cuban Esperanto Association (Kuba Esperanto-Asocio KEA)
- Ecuador: Ecuadorian Esperanto Association (Esperanto-Asocio de Ekvadoro EAE)
- Guatemala: Guatemalan Esperanto Association (Gvatemala Esperanto-Asocio)
- Mexico: Mexican Esperanto Institute (Meksika Esperanto-Instituto)
- Mexico: Mexican Esperanto Federation (Meksika Esperanto-Federacio)
- Nicaragua: Nicaraguan Esperanto Club (Esperanto-Klubo de Nikaragvo)
- Peru: Peruvian Esperanto Association (Perua Esperanto-Asocio)
- United States: Esperanto-USA (formerly Esperanto League for North America) (Esperanto-USA E-USA)
- Uruguay: Uruguayan Esperanto Society (Urugvaja Esperanto-Societo)
- Venezuela: Venezuelan Esperanto Association (Venezuela Esperanto-Asocio)

==== Asia ====
- Bangladesh: Bangladeshi Esperanto Association (Bangladeŝa Esperanto-Asocio)
- Cambodia: Cambodian Esperanto Association (Kamboĝa Esperanto-Asocio)
- China: Chinese Esperanto League (Ĉina Esperanto-Ligo)
- India: Indian Esperanto Federation (Federacio Esperanto de Barato FEB)
- Indonesia: Indonesian Esperanto Association (Indonezia Esperanto-Asocio)
- Iran: Iranian Esperanto Association (Irana Esperanto-Asocio IREA)
  - Iranian Young Esperantists (Irana Esperantista Junulara Organizo)
- Japan: Japanese Esperanto Institute (Japana Esperanto-Instituto)
- Malaysia: Malaysian Esperanto Association (Malajzia Esperanto-Asocio)
- Mongolia: Mongolian Esperanto Society (Mongola Esperanto-Societo)
- Nepal: Nepali Esperanto Association (Nepala Esperanto-Asocio)
- Nepal: International Club Of Esperanto Nepal (NICE)
- Pakistan: Pakistan Esperanto Association (Pakistana Esperanto-Asocio PakEsA)
  - Young Esperantists of Pakistan (Junularo Esperantista Pakistana JEP)
- South Korea: Korean Esperanto Association (Korea Esperanto-Asocio)
- Sri Lanka: Sri Lankan Esperanto Association (Srilanka Esperanto-Asocio)
- Taiwan: Taiwan Esperanto Association (Tajvana Esperanto-Asocio).

(Not recognized by UEA, owing to the island's disputed political status.)

- Thailand: Thailand Esperanto Association (Tajlanda Esperanto-Instituto)
- Uzbekistan: Uzbek Esperanto Association (Uzbeka Esperanto-Asocio)
- Vietnam: Vietnamese Esperanto Association (Vjetnama Esperanto-Asocio)

==== Central and Eastern Europe ====
- Azerbaijan: Azerbaijani Esperanto Association (Azerbajĝana Esperanto-Asocio)
- Armenia: Armenian Esperantist Union (Armena Esperantista Unuiĝo)
- Bosnia-Herzegovina: Esperanto League of Bosnia and Herzegovina (Esperanto-Ligo de Bosnio kaj Hercegovino)
- Bulgaria: Bulgarian Esperanto Association (Bulgara Esperanto-Asocio BEA)
- Croatia: Croatian Esperanto League (Kroata Esperanto-Ligo)
- Czech Republic: Czech Esperanto Association (Ĉeĥa Esperanto-Asocio)
- Estonia: Estonian Esperanto Association (Esperanto-Asocio de Estonio)
- Hungary: Hungarian Esperanto Association (Hungarlanda Esperanto-Asocio HEA)
- Latvia: Latvian Esperanto Association (Latvia Esperanto-Asocio)
- Lithuania: Lithuanian Esperanto Association (Litova Esperanto-Asocio)
- Macedonia: Macedonian Esperanto League (Makedonia Esperanto-Ligo)
- Poland: Polish Esperanto Association (Pola Esperanto-Asocio PEA)
- Romania: Esperanto Association of Romania (Esperanto-Asocio de Rumanio)
- Russia: Russian Esperantist Union (Rusia Esperantista Unio REU)
- Serbia: Serbian Esperanto League (Serbia Esperanto-Ligo SEL)
- Slovakia: Slovak Esperanto Federation (Slovakia Esperanta Federacio)
- Slovenia: Slovenian Esperanto League (Slovenia Esperanto-Ligo)
- Ukraine: Ukrainian Esperanto Association (Ukrainia Esperanto-Asocio UkrEA)

==== Western and Northern Europe ====
- Austria: Austrian Esperanto Federation (Aŭstria Esperanto-Federacio)
- Belgium: Belgian Esperanto Federation (Belga Esperanto-Federacio BEF)
- Denmark: Danish Esperanto Association (Dana Esperanto-Asocio DEA)
- Finland: Finnish Esperanto Association (Esperanto-Asocio de Finnlando)
- France: Espéranto-France (Unuiĝo Franca por Esperanto UFE)
- Germany: German Esperanto Association (Germana Esperanto-Asocio GEA)
- Greece: Greek Esperanto Association (Helena Esperanto-Asocio HEA)
- Iceland: Icelandic Esperanto Association (Islanda Esperanto-Asocio)
- Ireland: Irish Esperanto Association (Esperanto-Asocio de Irlando)
- Italy: Italian Esperanto Federation (Itala Esperanto-Federacio FEI)
- Luxembourg: Luxembourger Esperanto Association (Luksemburga Esperanto-Asocio LEA)
- Malta: Maltese Esperanto Society (Malta Esperanto-Societo)
- Netherlands: Esperanto Netherlands (Esperanto Nederland)
- Norway: Norwegian Esperanto League (Norvega Esperantista Ligo NEL)
- Portugal: Portuguese Esperanto Association (Portugala Esperanto-Asocio)
- Spain: Spanish Esperanto Federation (Hispana Esperanto-Federacio HEF)
  - Catalonia: Catalan Esperanto Association (Kataluna Esperanto-Asocio KEA)
- Sweden: Swedish Esperanto Federation (Sveda Esperanto-Federacio)
- Switzerland: Swiss Esperanto Society (Svisa Esperanto-Societo SES)
- United Kingdom: Esperanto Association of Britain (Esperanto-Asocio de Britio EAB)
  - Young British Esperantists (Junularo Esperantista Brita JEB)
  - Scotland: Scottish Esperanto Association (Esperanto-Asocio de Skotlando EAS)

==== Middle East ====
- Israel: Israeli Esperanto League (Esperanto-Ligo en Israelo ELI)
- Iran: Iranian Esperanto Association (Irana Esperanto-Asocio)

==== Oceania ====
- Australia: Australian Esperanto Association (Aŭstralia Esperanto-Asocio AEA)
- New Zealand: New Zealand Esperanto Association (Nov-Zelanda Esperanto-Asocio NZEA)

== World Anational Association ==
- World Anational Association (Sennacieca Asocio Tutmonda or SAT)

=== Free Esperanto Associations linked to SAT ===
- Anglophone: Workers' Esperanto Movement (SAT En Britio SATEB)
- Francophone: Friends of the SAT (SAT-Amikaro)
- Germanophone: Free Association for Germanophone Regions (Libera Esperanto-Asocio por Germanlingvaj regionoj LEA/G)
- Hispanophone: SAT in Spain (SAT-en-Hispanio SATeH)
- Russophone: Popular Russian Esperanto Movement (Popola Rusia Esperanto-Movado PREM)
- Swedophone: Swedish Worker's Esperanto Association (Sveda Laborista Esperanto Asocio SLEA)

=== Fractions of the SAT ===
- Fraction for Distributive Economy (Frakcio por Distribua Ekonomio)
- Communist Fraction (Komunista Frakcio)
- Libertarian Fraction (Liberecana Frakcio)
- Freethinking Fraction (Liberpensula Frakcio)
- Pacifist Fraction (Porpaca frakcio)
- Anationalist Fraction (Sennaciisma Frakcio)
- Rainbow Fraction (Ĉielarka Frakcio)
- Humanist Fraction (Humanista Frakcio)

== Other associations ==
- Agriculture: International Agricultural Esperanto Association (Internacia Agrikultura Esperanto-Asocio, IAEA)
- Art: Universal Artistic League of Esperantists (Universala Artista Ligo de Esperantistoj, UALE)
- Atheism: World Atheist Esperanto Organisation (Ateista Tutmonda Esperanto-Organizo, ATEO)
- Cats: Cat Circle (Rondo Kato)

Esperantist Cat Lovers (Esperantista Kat-amikaro)

- Chess: International Esperanto Chess League (Esperanta Ŝak-Ligo Internacia, EŜLI)
- Construction: World Association of Construction Esperantists (Tutmonda Asocio de Konstruistoj Esperantistaj, TAKE)
- Cycling: International Movement of Esperanto Bicyclists (Biciklista Esperanto Movado Internacia, BEMI).
- Disabilities: Association of Handicapped Esperantists (Asocio de Esperantistaj Handikapuloj, AEH)
- Economics: International Commercial and Economic Federation (Internacia Komerca kaj Ekonomia Federacio, IKEF)
- Education: International League of Esperanto Instructors (Internacia Ligo de Esperantistaj Instruistoj, ILEI)
- Ethnic groups: International Committee for Ethnic Liberties (Internacia Komitato por Etnaj Liberecoj, IKEL)

European Club (Eŭropa Klubo)
Association for a European Identity (Asocio por Eŭropa Konscio AEK)

- Go (game): International Esperanto Go League (Esperantista Go-Ligo Internacia, EGLI)
- Homosexuality: International Association of Gay and Lesbian Esperantists (Ligo de Samseksamaj Geesperantistoj, LSG)
- Journalism: World Esperantist Journalist Association (Tutmonda Esperantista Ĵurnalista Asocio TEĴA)
- Literature: Association of Esperanto Writers (Esperantlingva Verkista Asocio, EVA)

Centre PEN Esperanto (Esperanta PEN-Centro)

- Law: Esperanto Law Association (Esperanta Jura Asocio)
- Music: Esperanto Music League (Muzika Esperanto Ligo, MEL)

EUROKKA (EUROKKA ou Esperanto-Rok-Asocio)
Klavar Association of the Netherlands (Klavar-unuiĝo Nederlanda, KuN)

- Naturism: International Esperanto Naturist Organisation (Internacia Naturista Organizo Esperantista, INOE)
- Non-smokers: World Association of Esperantist Non-smokers (Tutmonda Asocio de Esperantistaj Nefumantoj, TAdEN)
- Pedagogy: International Group for a Modern Education with Esperanto (Internacia Celado por Edukado Moderna per Esperanto, ICEM Esperanto)
- Philately: Philatelist Esperanto League (Esperanto-Ligo Filatelista, ELF)

Friendly Circle of Esperanto-items Collectors (Amika Rondo de Esperantaĵ-Kolektantoj, AREK)

- Philosophy: World Philosophy Association (Filozofia Asocio Tutmonda, FAT)
- Post and telecommunications: International Esperanto Association of Post and Telecommunication (Internacia Poŝtista kaj Telekomunikista Esperanto-Asocio, IPTEA)
- Radio: Esperanto Friendship on the Radio (Amikaro de Esperanto en Radio, AERA)

International League of Esperantist Radio Amateurs (Internacia Ligo de Esperantistaj Radioamatoroj, ILERA)

- Railroads: International Railroad Esperanto Federation (Internacia Fervojista Esperanto-Federacio, IFEF)
- Rotary International: Friendship of Rotarian Esperantists (Rotaria Amikaro de Esperantistoj, RADE)
- Scouting: League of Esperanto Scouts (Skolta Esperanto Ligo, SEL)
- Solidarity: World Solidarity Against Hunger (Monda Fonduso de Solidareco Kontraŭ la Malsato)

Internet solidarity (Solidareca Reto)

- Syndicalism: Syndical Action (Sindikata Agado)
- Tourism: World Tourism (Monda Turismo, MT)
- Translation: (Internacia Traduk-Reto pere de Esperanto, ITRE)
- Universalism: Universal Alliance (Alianco Universala)
- Vegetarianism: World Vegetarian Esperanto Association (Tutmonda Esperantista Vegetarana Asocio, TEVA)
- Visual impairment: International League of Blind Esperantists (Ligo Internacia de Blindaj Esperantistoj, LIBE)
- Youth: World Esperanto Youth Organization (Tutmonda Esperantista Junulara Organizo, TEJO)
- Institute Martinus (Martinus-lnstituto)
- International Esperanto Centre of Citizens of the World (Esperantista Internacia Centro de la Civitanoj de la Mondo)
- Circle of Friends of Bruno Gröning (Amikaro Bruno Gröning)
- Esperanto Veterans Club (Veterana Esperantista Klubo, VEK)
- Movement Without a Name (Movado sen Nomo, MsN)
- Spirit of Hope (Espermenso)
- Chain of Esperanto Motorcyclists (Esperantista Motorciklanta Ĉeno, EMĈ)
- (Internacia Forstista Rondo Esperantlingva, IFRE)
- (Hejmoj de Internacia Kulturo, HIK)
- (Organiza Societo de Internaciaj Esperanto-Konferencoj, OSIEK)
- (Esperanto-Fako de la Naturamika Internacio, TANEF)
- (CEUFO - regiona Esperanta centro pri nifologio)
- (Asocio de Sociallaboristoj Esperantistaj, ASLE)

=== Politics ===
- Alter-globalization: Citizens of the World (Civitanoj de la Mondo)

Assemblée sociale mondiale (Monda Asembleo Socia, MAS)

- Communism: International Esperanto Communist Collective (Internacia Komunista Esperantista Kolektivo IKEK)

Esperanto Work Federation (FET)

- Ecology: Association of Green Esperantists (Asocio de Verduloj Esperantistaj, AVE)
- Pacifism: World Peace Esperanto Movement (Mondpaca Esperantista Movado, MEM)

Pacifist Movement (Tutmonde ou Pacifista Movado)

=== Religion ===
- Bahá'í: Bahá'í Esperanto-League (Bahaa Esperanto-Ligo, BEL)
- Buddhism: Buddhist Esperanto League (Budhana Ligo Esperantista, BLE)
- Catholicism: International Union of Catholic Esperantists (Internacia Katolika Unuiĝo Esperantista, IKUE)
- Bible study: International Association of Biblists and Orientalists (Internacia Asocio de Bibliistoj kaj Orientalistoj, IABO)
- Christadelphian : Christadelphian Internacia Biblio-Misio
- Hillelism: Hillelist Esperanto Circle (Hilelista Esperanto-Rondo)
- Islam: Universal Islam Esperanto Association (Universala Islama Esperanto-Asocio, UIEA)
- Mormonism: Mormons for Esperanto (Por-Esperanta Mormonaro, PEM)
- Ecumenism: World Ecumenical League (Tutmonda Ekumena Ligo, TEL)
- Oomoto: Esperanto Propaganda Association of Oomoto (Esperanto-Propaganda Asocio de Oomoto, EPA)
- Orthodox Christianity: World Orthodox Esperanto League (Tutmonda Ortodoksa Ligo Esperantista, TOLE)
- Protestantism: International League of Christian Esperantists (Kristana Esperantista Ligo Internacia, KELI)
- Quaker: Quaker Esperanto Society (Kvakera Esperanto-Societo, KES)
- Spiritism: Society of Spiritism F.V. Lorenz (Spirita Eldona Societo F.V. Lorenz)
- Theology: International Association of the Study of Spiritual and Theological Precepts (Asocio de Studado Internacia pri Spiritaj kaj Teologiaj Instruoj ASISTI)
- Unitarian Universalist: Unitarian Universalist Esperanto Network ("Unitara-universalista Esperanto Retaro" UUER)
- Won Buddhism: Won Buddhist Esperanto Association (Esperantista Asocio de Ŭonbulismo EAŬ)

=== Science ===
- Astronomy: Astronomy Esperanto Club (Astronomia Esperanto-Klubo, AEK)
- Biology: Esperanto Circle of Biology and Ornithology (Biologia kaj Ornitologia Rondo Esperantlingva, BORE)

Association for the Introduction of a New Nomenclature in Biology (Asocio por la Enkonduko de Nova Biologia Nomenklaturo, NBN)

- Mathematics: International Association of Esperantist Mathematicians (Internacia Asocio de Esperantistaj Matematikistoj, IAdEM)
- Medicine: Universal Medicine Esperanto Association (Universala Medicina Esperanto-Asocio, UMEA)

(Internacia Naturkuraca Asocio, INA)
World Yumeiho Society (Monda Yumeiho-Societo)

- Science: International Scientific Esperanto Association (Internacia Scienca Asocio Esperantista, ISAE)

== Institutions ==
- Academy of Esperanto (Akademio de Esperanto)
- International Academy of Sciences (Akademio Internacia de la Sciencoj AIS)
- French Esperanto Institute (Franca Esperanto-Instituto FEI)
- Italian Esperanto Institute (Istituto Italiano di Esperanto IIE)
- Pakistan Esperanto Institute (Pakistana Esperanto-Instituto PEI)
