= List of Esperanto periodicals =

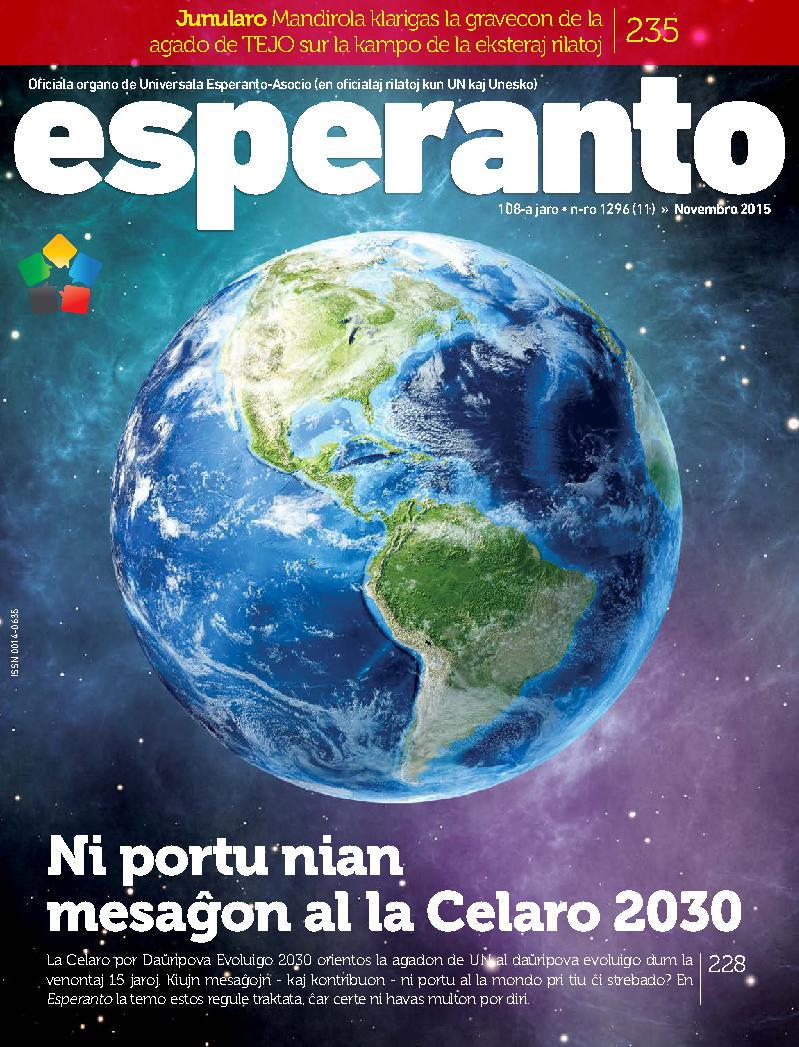
Esperanto, November 2015 issue

Esperanto periodicals have been an important element of the Esperanto movement since its beginning because it was one of the only practical ways the language could be used between conferences. The first Esperanto periodical was La Esperantisto, published from 1889 to 1895, and the second was Lingvo Internacia, published from 1895 to 1914. Hundreds of magazines have been published in Esperanto since then. This is an incomplete list.

== Current ==
- Esperantobladet (1909-today)
- Ateismo (English: Atheism), an atheist publication
- Aŭroro (Aurora), a Czech Republic–based publication for the blind, written in Esperanto Braille
- Aveno (Oat)
- Belarta rikolto (Literary Harvest), an annual collection of literary works by the winners of the Universal Esperanto Association's literary competitions
- Beletra Almanako (Belles-Lettres Almanac), a three-times-a-year periodical of Esperanto belles-lettres
- Dia Regno (God's Kingdom), Protestant publication
- Dio Benu (God Bless), Catholic publication
- Esperanto, a monthly publication of the Universal Esperanto Association
- Esperantologio / Esperanto Studies
- Espero Katolika (Catholic Hope), a Catholic publication
- Etnismo, published three times a year by IKEL contains information on ethnic topics
- Eventoj (Events)
- Femina
- Fenestro (Window)
- Fonto (Source), a monthly magazine about literature
- La Gazeto (The Magazine)
- Heroldo de Esperanto, a magazine published every three weeks about the Esperanto movement
- Homarane
- Hungara Fervojista Mondo
- Internacia Pedagogia Revuo
- Juna Amiko (Young Friend)
- La Juna Penso (The Young Thought)
- Kajeroj el la Sudo
- La KancerKliniko (The CancerClinic)
- La Karavelo
- Komencanto (Beginner)
- Kontakto (Contact), a monthly publication for young people published by TEJO, the World Esperanto Youth Organization
- Laŭte!
- Libera Folio, an online Esperanto magazine
- Literatura Foiro, a magazine about culture, bi-monthly published by the Esperanto PEN center, La Chaux-de-Fonds
- Medicina Heroldo
- Medicina Internacia Revuo
- Merkato
- Monato (Month), a monthly publication similar to Time or Newsweek, but with all articles written by people from the place which the article is about
- Le Monde diplomatique en Esperanto (The Diplomatic World in Esperanto)
- Naturista Vivo (Naturist Life)
- Penseo
- Rok-Gazet', a magazine about the Esperanto music (especially rock music) scene
- La Skolta Mondo (The Scout World)
- Scienca Revuo (Science Review) (though the latest issue is dated 2015)
- Scienco kaj Kulturo (Science and Culture)
- Semajno de enigmoj, an online monthly magazine of crosswords and puzzles in Esperanto
- Sennacieca Revuo (Anational Review)
- Sennaciulo (Anationalist)
- TEJO Tutmonde (TEJO Worldwide)
- Teleskopo (Telescope)
- Zajn'

=== Regional ===
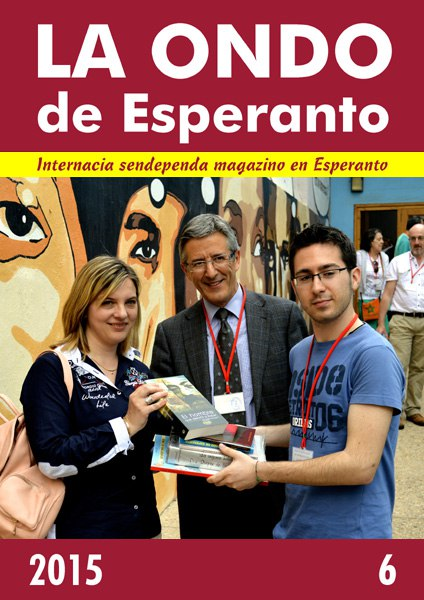
June 2016 edition of La Ondo de Esperanto

- Andaj Ondoj, Colombian publication
- Armena Esperantisto, Armenian publication, published by Armena Organiz-Komitato Esperantista and edited by G. Sevak, first published in 1958
- Bosnia lilio, Gazeto de Esperanto Ligo de Bosnio kaj Hercegovino, is publication by Esperanto League of Bosnia and Herzegovina since 1997.
- Brazila Esperantisto, Brazilian publication founded in 1907
- La Brita Esperantisto, British publication
- El Popola Ĉinio, Chinese publication
- L'Esperanto, Italian publication
- Esperanto en Afriko, African publication
- Esperanto en Azio, Asian publication
- Esperanto en Skotlando, Scottish publication
- Esperanto sub la Suda Kruco, publication of the Australian Esperanto Association and New Zealand Esperanto Association
- La Espero el Koreio, Korean publication
- Fenikso, Dutch publication
- Irana Esperantisto, independent Iranian quarterly culture magazine
- Israela Esperantisto, Israeli publication founded in 1959
- La Lampiro, São Paulo–based publication
- Lumo, Canadian publication
- Momenton!, Brazilian youth publication
- Le Monde de l'Espéranto, French publication
- Ni ĉiuj, Mexican publication
- Nova Irlanda Esperantisto, Irish publication
- La Ondo de Esperanto, an illustrated Kaliningrad-based publication
- La Revuo Orienta, Japanese publication
- Esperanto.cu, official publication of de Cuban Esperanto Association
- Por vi, Cuban Esperanto Youth Organization's journal
- Havanano, Havana based publication
- Usona Esperantisto, a bi-monthly publication of Esperanto-USA

== Historical ==
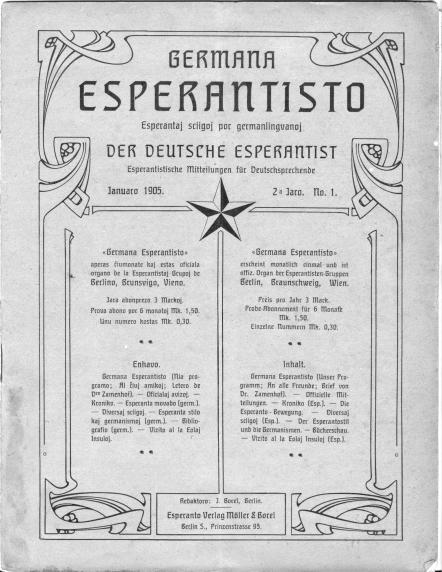
January 1905 edition of Germana Esperantisto

- Amerika Esperantisto (American Esperantist)
- Belga Esperantisto (Belgian Esperantist), Belgian magazine published from 1908 to 1961
- Bohema Revuo Esperantista (Bohemian Esperantist Review), Bohemian periodical published from 1907 to 1914
- Der Esperantist (The Esperantist)
- La Esperantisto (The Esperantist), the first Esperanto periodical, published from 1889 to 1895
- L'Espérantiste (The Esperantist), early French publication
- Germana Esperantisto (German Esperantist)
- Germana Esperanto-Gazeto (German Esperanto Magazine), published from 1908 to 1912
- Lingvo Internacia (International Language), published from 1895 to 1914
- Literatura Mondo (Literary World), published from 1922 to 1949
- La Migranto (The Migrant)
- La Movado (The Movement), French publication founded in 1909
- PACO
- La Revuo (The Review), published from 1906 to 1914, featuring many of the original publications of Zamenhof's translations
- Ruĝa Esperantisto (Red Esperantist), published in 1922 by Vladimir Varankin
- Sonorilo (Bell), Belgian magazine published from 1962 to 1974

== See also ==
- Esperanto literature
- Esperanto library
