= Esperantisto =

Esperantisto (meaning the Esperantist) may refer to a number of Esperanto publications including:

- La Esperantisto
- La Brita Esperantisto
- Amerika Esperantisto
- Irana Esperantisto
- Usona Esperantisto

== See also ==
- American Esperantist (disambiguation)
- Der Esperantist
- The British Esperantist
