= Native Esperanto speakers =

People who have acquired Esperanto as one of their native languages

Native Esperanto speakers (Esperanto: denaskuloj [denasˈkuloi̯] or denaskaj esperantistoj [deˈnaskai̯ esperanˈtistoi̯]) are people who have acquired Esperanto as one of their native languages. As of 1996, there were 350 or so attested cases of families with native Esperanto speakers. Estimates from associations indicate that there were around 1,000 Esperanto-speaking families, involving perhaps 2,000 children in 2004. In the majority of such families, the parents had the same native language, though in many the parents had different native languages, and only Esperanto in common.

== History ==
Raising children in Esperanto occurred early in the history of the language, notably with the five children of Montagu Butler (1884–1970). Owing to this, some families have passed Esperanto on to their children over several generations. Also notable are young Holocaust victim Petr Ginz, whose drawing of the planet Earth as viewed from the Moon was carried aboard the Space Shuttle Columbia, and Daniel Bovet, the recipient of the 1957 Nobel Prize in Physiology or Medicine.

In at least one instance, Esperanto was used as a bridge language for a family started by a couple who did not have a native language in common.

A woman speaking Esperanto

Esperanto is not the primary language of any geographic region, though it is spoken at events such as conventions like the World Congress of Esperanto and isolated offices, such as the World Esperanto Association's central office in Rotterdam. Consequently, native speakers have limited opportunity to meet one another except where meetings are specially arranged. For that reason, many parents consider it important to bring their children regularly to Esperanto conventions such as the annual "Renkontiĝo de Esperanto-familioj" (or "Esperantistaj familioj"; REF, since 1979). Similarly, the annual Children's Congress of Esperanto happens alongside the largest Esperanto convention, the World Congress of Esperanto (Universala Kongreso).

== List of noted native speakers ==
Below is a list of noted native speakers of Esperanto. The billionaire George Soros has often appeared on such lists, but Humphrey Tonkin, the translator of Soros's father Tivadar's memoir Maskerado ĉirkaŭ la morto into English (under the title Masquerade: The Incredible True Story of How George Soros’ Father Outsmarted the Gestapo), has disputed this. He has made no statements either way concerning Soros's brother, Paul.

- Daniel Bovet, Swiss-born Italian pharmacologist
- Petr Ginz, Czech author, artist, and Holocaust victim
- Kim J. Henriksen, Danish singer-musician
- Ino Kolbe, German author
- Carlo Minnaja, Italian writer

== Grammatical characteristics ==
The Esperanto of native-speaking children differs from the standard Esperanto spoken by their parents. In some cases this is due to interference from their other native language (the adstrate), but in others it appears to be an effect of acquisition.

Bergen (2001) found the following patterns in a study of eight native-speaking children, aged 6 to 14, who were bilingual in Hebrew (two siblings), Slovak (two siblings), French, Swiss German, Russian, and Croatian.

- Phonological reduction (usually to schwa) of vowels in common grammatical suffixes and one-syllable grammatical words. This occurred about 5% of the time. The reduced grammatical suffixes were mostly the -o of nouns and -as of present-tense verbs, but occasionally also the -a of adjectives. Reduced grammatical words included personal pronouns (which all end in i), the article la 'the', and prepositions such as al 'to' and je (a generic preposition). The article la was sometimes omitted with the Slavic speakers, as might be expected as a contact effect.
- Proper nouns were generally unassimilated, either to Esperanto grammatical suffixes or to stress patterns. Proper nouns are common exceptions to grammatical rules in many languages, and this pattern is common among L2-speakers of Esperanto as well. However, stress was also observed to vary in native words, for example nómiĝas 'is/am called' and ámikoj 'friends' (stress expected on the i in both cases).
- Children were not observed to use compound tenses (esti + a participle) or aspectual affixes (ek-, -iĝi, -adi, re-, el-) on verbal roots. Except for simple passives, the parents were not observed to use compound tenses either. However, they did use aspectual affixes (at least in the formal context of Bergen's interviews), but nonetheless the children did not use such affixes even when their other language was Slavic, where aspectual affixes are important. The closest thing to such forms that the children were observed to use were fini + verb 'stop doing something', komenci + verb 'start doing something', ankoraŭ 'still', and kaj poste 'and then'; but even then, usage was not as common as equivalents in the adstrate language. -Iĝi was, however, used on adjectival roots:

Malheliĝas kaj ili ankoraŭ estas ĉe la plaĝo. – It's becoming dark and they are still on the beach.

- The word order was mostly SVO. OSV order was also attested, but half of all instances were with the child who spoke Swiss German, which allows preposing the object.
- Related to the fixed word order, there is evidence that the accusative case has become redundant. Usage closely reflects the role of case in the adstrate language, being used only where consistent with the other language, but not always even there. Usage ranged from ≈100% with the Slovak-speaking children, to 0% with the French-speaking child, despite the fact that the French mother consistently used the accusative case in her own speech. Slovak has an accusative case on nouns, French does not. Other children used the accusative in only some of the contexts required by standard Esperanto, largely reflecting usage in their other language. There were other patterns to emerge as well. The Croatian child, for example, used the accusative only on personal pronouns immediately following a verb, a feature of reduction to clitic form common in Croatian (underlined):

En la sepa, unu infano prenis lian ŝtrumpo. (Standard: lian ŝtrumpon) – At seven o'clock, a child took his sock.

but

Poste li iris kaj poste li prenis en unu mano lia simio. (Standard: lian simion) – Then he went and then he took in one hand his monkey.

Among children that do use the accusative, its usage may be regularized from adult usage, at least at young ages. For example, when a screw dropped out of a lock, a young (≤ 5-year-old) child said it malvenis la pordon. Besides the novel use of mal- with veni 'to come' to mean 'come away from', the accusative is not used in adult speech for motion away, but only motion towards. However, in this case the child generalized the usage of the accusative for direct objects.

Lindstedt, on the other hand, referencing Bergen's study, contends that "it is difficult to find convincing examples of changes introduced by the process of nativisation. All examples proposed seem rather to be due to (1) transfers from the children’s other native languages, (2) differences between the spoken and written register of Esperanto and, in some cases, (3) incomplete acquisition." Some of the features, such as phonological reduction, can be found in the speech of some fluent non-native speakers, while some other, such as the attrition of the accusative, are completely absent from the speech of some native-speaking children.

== Word derivation ==
Native-speaking children, especially at a young age, may coin words that do not exist in the speech of their parents, often for concepts for which Esperanto has a word they do not yet know, by exploiting the morphology of the language. This is analogous to what adult speakers do for concepts where Esperanto lacks a word, and indicates that some of the grammatical alterations that adult learners may find difficult come easily to native-speaking children. For example,

- Antonyms in mal-

The prefix mal- is extremely productive, and children extend it beyond the usage they hear:

malmiksi 'to separate' (miksi to mix)
malpluvi 'to stop raining' (pluvi to rain)
malscias 'is ignorant of' (scias knows)
malnuna 'past' (nuna present)
malfari 'to break (un-make)' (fari to make)
maltie 'here' (tie there)
malstartas 'turn off (an engine)' (startas 'starts', standard Esperanto ŝaltas 'switches on')
malĝustigis 'broke' (ĝustigis repaired, made right)
malsandviĉiĝis 'became (a shape) which isn't a sandwich anymore' (sandviĉ-iĝis 'became a sandwich', of a brother playing with cushions)
malstelita 'not surrounded by stars' (of the moon; from stelita 'starred')
malmateno 'evening' (mateno morning)
malio 'nothing' (io 'something'; standard Esperanto nenio 'nothing')
malinterne 'externally' (interne internally)
malgraveda 'no longer pregnant' (graveda pregnant)

- Containers in -ujo

elektrujo 'a battery' (elektro electricity)

- Tendencies in -ema

ventrema 'fat' (tending to belly-ness, from ventro 'belly')

- Places in -ejo

triciklejo 'a place for tricycles'

- Feminine in -ino

penisino 'vagina' (peniso penis)

- Instrument in -ilo

maltajpilo 'delete key' (maltajpi to delete, un-type, from tajpi to type)

- Verbs from nouns

nazas 'rubs noses' (nazo nose)
buŝas 'kisses on the mouth' (buŝo mouth)
langeti 'to give a little lick' (diminutive, from lango tongue)
dentumado 'activity with teeth' (dento tooth, -umi doing something undefined with, -ado noun of action)
kuvi 'to have a bath' (kuvo 'tub'; standard Esperanto bani sin 'to bathe oneself')
mukis '(my nose) was running' (muko 'snot', by analogy with sangis 'bled', from sango 'blood')
literiĝas 'the letters are changing' (middle voice, from litero 'letter (of the alphabet)')
ne seĝu sur la divano 'don't sit on the couch' (seĝo 'chair'; standard Esperanto sidu 'sit')
muzi 'to museum' (from muzeo 'museum', misunderstood as muz-ejo 'a place for museuming')

- Verbs from adjectives

belos 'will be beautiful' (bela 'beautiful'; found in poetry, but not usual in adult speech)
samante kiel mi 'being the same as me (you ...)' (sama same)

- Adjectives from verbs

rida '(often) laughing' (ridi 'to laugh'; standard Esperanto ridema)

- Adjectives from nouns

ventuma 'making a breeze' (from ventum-ilo 'a fan')

- Compounds with prepositions

perblove 'by blowing' (per 'via', blovi 'to blow')
mi superruliĝos vin 'I will roll over you' (an intransitive verb ending in -iĝos won't normally take an object in the accusative case, but here it is necessary because the preposition super 'over' has been moved to the verb rul 'roll'. Without the suffix -iĝos, however, the meaning would be a transitive 'I will roll you over'.)

- Adverbs from verbs

Ege halte, ege paŭze, ege salte 'very stoppingly, very pausingly, very jumpily'

- Adverbs from nouns and prepositions

Ene estas akve 'inside is wet' (akvo 'water'; standard Esperanto is malseke, an adverb being required because no specific thing is wet.)

- Nouns from adjectives

ludeblo 'the possibility of playing' (ludi to play, -ebla -able)

== See also ==
- List of Esperanto speakers
- Constructed language
- Natural language
