= Rudi Graetz =

Rudi Graetz (1907 – 1 October 1977) was a German esperantist. He was president of the "Central Workers' Circle of Friends of Esperanto", part of the quasi-governmental Cultural Association in the former German Democratic Republic, and committee member of the Universal Esperanto Association.

He learned Esperanto in his youth, and was an active member of the Esperanto workers movement between the two world wars. After the revival of the Esperantism in the GDR, in 1965, Graetz was chosen as its representative at the World Congress and other international meetings. Also, he was a functionary of the Mondpaca Esperantista Movado (World Peace Esperantist Movement). His articles often appeared in the magazines PACO and Der Esperantist. He died in Berlin at the age of 70.
