= Claus Killing-Günkel =

Claus Killing-Günkel (born Günkel; 9 October 1963 in Eschweiler) is a German schoolteacher and writer on Esperanto, interlinguistics and constructed languages. His publications concern Esperanto lexicography and etymology, Esperanto-derived languages, mathematical terminology and language creation.

== Life and career ==
Killing-Günkel studied mathematics, computer science and French at RWTH Aachen University and the University of Paderborn between 1982 and 1992. He subsequently worked as a lecturer in the Department of Education at Paderborn in 1993 and 1994.

He has worked as a schoolteacher since 1997. From 1999 to 2024, he taught at the Nell-Breuning-Berufskolleg in Rhöndorf. Since August 2024, he has taught at the Vinzenz-von-Paul-Berufskolleg in Aachen.

He has also been involved in local historical research in Eschweiler, including activities associated with the Eschweiler Geschichtsverein (Eschweiler Historical Society).

== Esperanto lexicography and etymology ==
Killing-Günkel began studying Esperanto in 1981. He subsequently contributed to Esperanto publications and became involved in research on its vocabulary, etymology and specialized terminology.

=== Gunkela Vortaro ===
His dictionary GuVo – Gunkela Vortaro appeared in several editions during the 1990s.

In his Berlina Komentita Bibliografio de Vortaroj kaj Terminaroj en Esperanto 1887–2014 (2015), Esperanto lexicographer Bernhard Pabst describes the editions of 1992, 1994 and 1997. According to Pabst, the 1992 edition contained 912 headwords with definitions modelled on the Plena Ilustrita Vortaro (PIV). His annotated bibliography also comments on the physical presentation and legibility of the early editions.

The provisional second edition of Gunkela Vortaro, published in Paderborn in 1994, is also included in the bibliography of Bertilo Wennergren's Plena Manlibro de Esperanta Gramatiko (PMEG).

=== Volapük–Esperanto dictionary ===
In 1996, Killing-Günkel published Vortaro Volapuko-Esperanto Esperanto-Volapuko kun etimologiaj rimarkoj, a bilingual Volapük–Esperanto and Esperanto–Volapük dictionary with etymological notes.

The dictionary is listed in Detlev Blanke's study Plansprachige Wörterbücher, which examines dictionaries of constructed and planned languages.

=== Esperanto etymology ===
Killing-Günkel also published studies of individual Esperanto words and their origins.

His article Adiaŭ, naŭ ĵaŭdaj fraŭlinoj!, published in Literatura Foiro in 1996, examined the etymology of Esperanto words ending in -aŭ.

The article was cited in a discussion of Esperanto etymology published by the Japan Esperanto Institute in 2019. The Japanese-language discussion refers to Günkel's treatment of forms found in early Esperanto.

=== Culinary terminology and the PIV ===
Killing-Günkel contributed to the revision of culinary terminology in the Esperanto reference dictionary Plena Ilustrita Vortaro (PIV).

His paper Übersetzungsprobleme und Entscheidungsmechanismen bei der Revision kulinarischer Begriffe eines Esperantowörterbuches, published in 1996, discussed problems of translation and terminology selection encountered during dictionary revision.

One documented example of his contribution concerns the Esperanto word knedliko, referring to a type of dumpling.

In a discussion published in the Czech Esperanto periodical Starto in 2009, Michel Duc Goninaz, editor of the revised PIV, stated that he had accepted the term for inclusion in the dictionary at Günkel's suggestion, after verifying that it had already appeared in a gastronomic glossary published in 1958.

The suitability and meaning of knedliko were subsequently matters of discussion among Esperanto lexicographers and terminologists. The same issue of Starto published responses from several contributors, including a statement from the advisory service of the Akademio de Esperanto, which questioned the need for the word when used as a synonym for the more general pastobulo.

The terminology was also examined by Wera Blanke in her study Knedliko – ĉu terminologie bongusta?, which discussed the problems of defining and classifying different kinds of dumplings in Esperanto.

== Esperantidos and interlinguistics ==
Since the 1990s, Killing-Günkel has written about Esperantidos, constructed languages derived from Esperanto or substantially influenced by it.

His paper Der aktuelle Stand von Esperantiden – Vorstellung und Schlussbemerkung, published in 1997, discussed the classification of Esperanto-derived language projects and differences in their grammar, orthography and vocabulary.

During the 1990s, he was also involved in editing Nova Provo, a journal concerned with proposals for reforming Esperanto and related constructed languages.

His publications and conference presentations have addressed other international auxiliary languages, including Ido, Volapük, Interlingue and Interlingua.

Killing-Günkel is a member of the Gesellschaft für Interlinguistik (GIL), a German society for interlinguistics. He has presented papers at its annual conferences and contributed to its publication series.

For the society, he also compiled a subject index of the first 100 issues of its bulletin Interlinguistische Informationen.

== Interlingua and mathematical terminology ==
Killing-Günkel has published studies comparing the formation of scientific and mathematical terminology in international auxiliary languages.

In Interlingua, Esperanto und Mathematik (2020), he compared approaches to mathematical terminology in Esperanto and Interlingua, particularly the use of internationally recognizable word forms and the creation of terminology from a language's own lexical resources.

His subsequent paper Mathematik und Regel 15 (2021) examined the treatment of international words in Esperanto, particularly in relation to Rule 15 of its fundamental grammar.

== Constructed language projects ==
=== Cliiuy ===
In 1978, Killing-Günkel began developing a constructed language called Cliiuy, also known in German as Clügisch.

He described its origins and successive stages of development in Cliiuy – wie ich eine Sprache schuf. Autobiographisches zur Entwicklung einer geplanten Sprache, published in 2011 in the proceedings of the 20th annual conference of the Gesellschaft für Interlinguistik.

=== Atlamak ===
In November 2024, Killing-Günkel presented his international auxiliary language project Atlamak at the 34th annual conference of the Gesellschaft für Interlinguistik in Berlin.

== Selected publications ==
=== Esperanto studies and lexicography ===
- GuVo – Gunkela Vortaro. Paderborn, 1992; expanded editions in 1994 and 1997.
- Vortaro Volapuko-Esperanto Esperanto-Volapuko kun etimologiaj rimarkoj. Viersen, 1996.
- "Adiaŭ, naŭ ĵaŭdaj fraŭlinoj!" Literatura Foiro, vol. 27, no. 162, 1996.
- "Übersetzungsprobleme und Entscheidungsmechanismen bei der Revision kulinarischer Begriffe eines Esperantowörterbuches". Interlinguistische Informationen, Supplement 1, 1996.
- "Der aktuelle Stand von Esperantiden – Vorstellung und Schlussbemerkung". Interlinguistische Informationen, Supplement 2, 1997.

=== Interlinguistics and language creation ===
- "Cliiuy – wie ich eine Sprache schuf. Autobiographisches zur Entwicklung einer geplanten Sprache". Interlinguistische Informationen, Supplement 18, 2011, pp. 57–66.
- "Sprachschöpfung in der Algebra unter besonderer Berücksichtigung der Koniologie". Interlinguistische Informationen, Supplement 21, 2014.
- "Interlingua, Esperanto und Mathematik". Jahrbuch der Gesellschaft für Interlinguistik 2020, pp. 65–82.
- "Mathematik und Regel 15". Jahrbuch der Gesellschaft für Interlinguistik 2021.
- "Kurzer Vergleich der Rechtschreibung des Japanischen und des Esperanto". Jahrbuch der Gesellschaft für Interlinguistik 2025, pp. 35–42.
