= Karl Maier =

Karl Maier may refer to:

- Karl Maier (Esperantist)
- Karl Maier (speedway rider)
- Karl Maier (journalist)

== See also ==
- Karl Meyer (disambiguation)
