= PACO (magazine) =

- Editor-in-Chief: Eugen Menger and Detlev Blanke
- Categories: Magazine
- Frequency: monthly
- Circulation: 5,000 - 6,000 / monthly
- Publisher: MEM and Central Workers' Circle of Friends of Esperanto
- First issue: 1966
- Final issue: 1989
- Country: East Germany
- Language: Esperanto

PACO was the name of the official Mondpaca Esperantista Movado (MEM) magazine.

== History ==
The Mondpaca Esperantista Movado (World Peace Esperantist Movement), founded in 1953 in Austria, had great significance for the reorganizing of the Esperanto movement in European socialist countries. The movement published a monthly journal called PACO. The magazine was published every month in a different country, sometimes behind the Iron Curtain. The January issue might have been edited by the Japanese MEM section, the February issue by the French section, the March issue by the Bulgarian section, etc. Also, the German Democratic Republic's MEM section published several issues of PACO.

== National editions ==
=== German Democratic Republic ===
Even before the formalization of the Esperantist movement in the GDR, there had already appeared a ten-page 1960 Esperanto booklet published by the German Peace Council. Edited by Ludwig Schödl (Neuruppin) and Karl Maier (Berlin), it had a circulation of 6,000 copies.

After the foundation of the cultural association Centra Laborrondo de Esperanto-Amikoj ("Central Workers' Circle of Friends of Esperanto", known since 1981 as the Esperanto Association (Cultural Association) of the GDR), this organization became the GDR's MEM section, and from 1966 to 1989 it published regularly the annual special edition of PACO. The edition of 1966 had 32 pages, those from 1967 and 1968 had 36 pages, and the rest had 40 pages.

There was a regular bimonthly series, printed with better-quality paper. In addition, the annual special issue from the GDR brought more content and had better design. These editions of PACO contained material about international political problems and multiple cultural articles, as well as notes on interlinguistics, esperantology and studies of the advance of the Esperantist movement in East Germany and abroad.

To be of a similar standard to widely circulated publications, it had the collaboration of professional graphic artists from the Dresden editorial office of Zeit im Bild. This way the magazine was richly illustrated and presented in the A4 format. The print run was generally from 5,000 to 6,000 copies. MEM distributed the magazine not only inside the GDR but worldwide. Cumulatively, the 24 issues published totalled 944 pages. Issue 162 of Der Esperantist (1990) contained a cumulative index of articles.

The chief editors (at least formally) were Eugen Menger, from 1966 to 1971, and Detlev Blanke, from 1972 to 1989.
