= Schödl =

Schödl is a surname. Notable people with the surname Schödl include:

- Hans Schödl (born 1885), Austrian sports shooter
- Ludwig Schödl (1909–1997), German writer
- Max Schödl (1834–1921), Austrian painter
