= American Esperantist =

American Esperantist may refer to:

- Amerika Esperantisto, defunct 20th century Esperanto periodical
- Usona Esperantisto, bi-monthly periodical of Esperanto-USA
