= Italian Esperanto Federation =

Language promotion organization

Federazione Esperantista Italiana
- Founded: March 21, 1910; 116 years ago
- Type: Non-governmental organization
- Purpose: Esperanto
- Headquarters: Milan, Italy
- Region served: National
- Members: 884
- Parent organization: Universal Esperanto Association
- Website: www.esperanto.it

The Italian Esperanto Federation (Italian: Federazione Esperantista Italiana; Esperanto: Itala Esperanto-Federacio, or FEI, for short) is a non-profit organisation that promotes the international auxiliary language Esperanto in Italy. It's headquartered in Milan.

FEI owns the esperanto.it Internet domain. Its youth section is called "Gioventù esperantista italiana" (English: Italian Esperantist Youth; Esperanto: Itala Esperantista Junularo, abbreviated in IEJ).

== History ==
The association was born in Florence on 21 March 1910; the Italian government recognised it as a moral entity with D.P.R. n. 1720 of 28 June 1956.

Its current President is Laura Brazzabeni for the second consecutive term. Before was Luigi Fraccaroli and before him, from 2014 to 2020, was Michela Lipari.

== Activity ==
=== In Italy ===
The Italian Esperanto Federation is actively involved in a range of initiatives aimed at promoting and disseminating knowledge and the use of the Esperanto language. Among these activities are in-person and remote language courses, offered through electronic and postal means.

These courses are typically provided free of charge and culminate in a final examination administered by local members of the International League of Esperanto Teachers (ILEI), with proficiency levels aligned to the European Framework's classification (CEFR).

Since 2015, FEI has also overseen the management of a free online language course, the KIREK course, previously managed by the youth section, IEJ. This course has been adapted from the German mail course "Korrespondenzkurs Esperanto," created by Ulrich Becker, and has been available online since 2003.

=== External relations ===
The association is a national member of the Universal Esperanto Association (UEA) whilst its youth section is member of the World Esperanto Youth Organization (TEJO).

They also appeared in various media such as national television, press, radio, and established a presence in the Internet. They established a regular presence at the Perugia-Assisi peace march. The federation collaborates with different pacifist associations, with either gnostic or agnostic orientations.

== Congresses ==
=== National Congresses ===
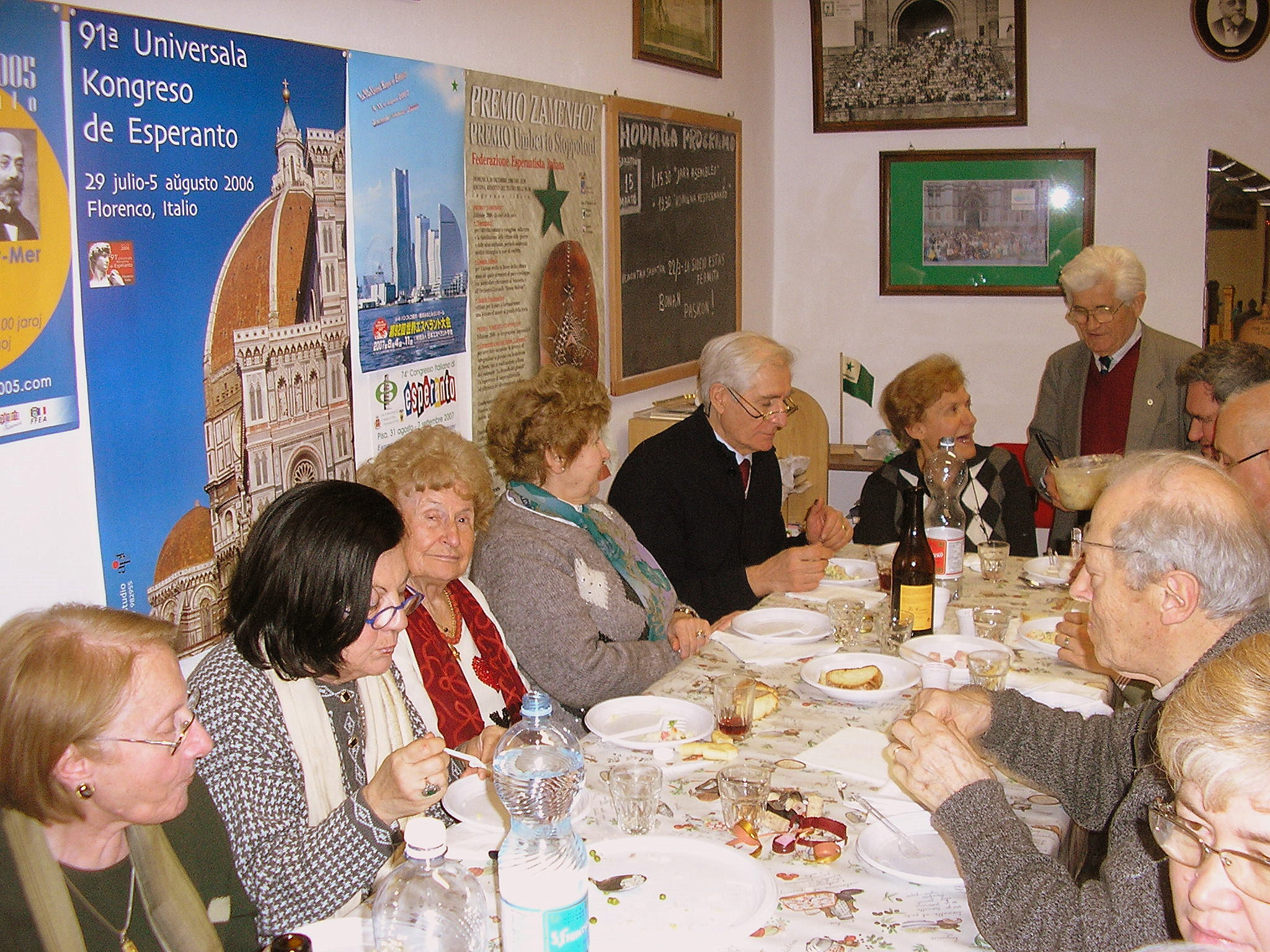
Common dinner among Italian esperantophones. A poster of the 91st World Esperanto Congress of Florence may be noticed in the background. Bologna, March 2008.

The federation convenes conferences on a range of subjects related to the Esperanto language and also coordinates literary and poetry contests.

On an annual basis, FEI takes charge of organising and executing the Italian Esperanto Congress. At the same time, its youth branch, the Italian Esperantist Youth, hosts the International Youth Festival. FEI has been responsible for organising national congresses since the inaugural event in Florence in 1910, and has continued to do so ever since. The federation holds conferences on various topics related to the Esperanto language and organises literary and poetry competitions. Every year FEI organises and manages the Italian Esperanto Congress, while its youth section, the Italian Esperantist Youth, organizes then International Youth Festival.

In 1910, FEI organised and hosted in Florence the first national congress, and has been organising them ever since.

=== International Congresses ===
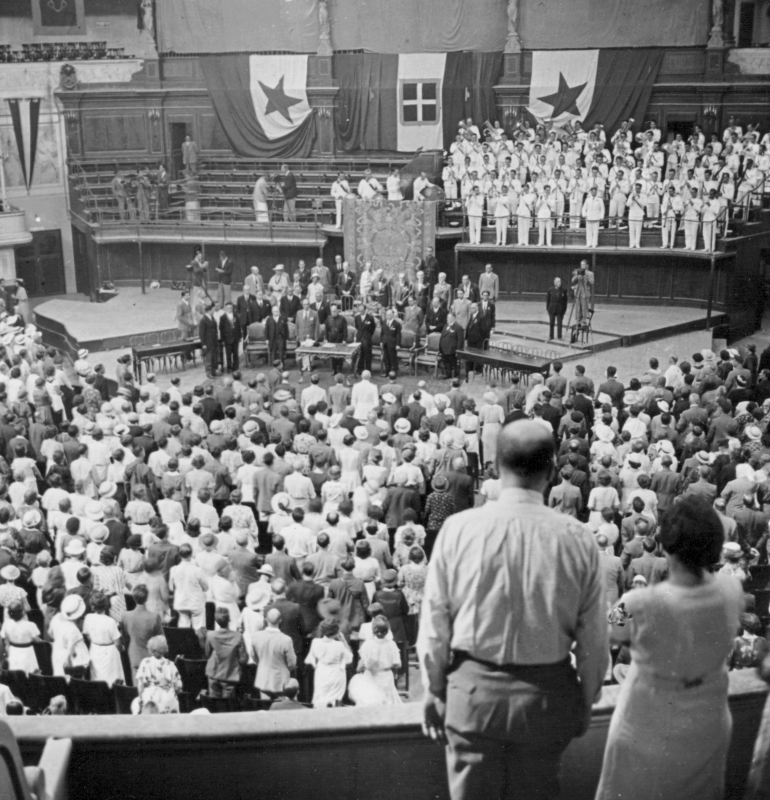
27th World Esperanto Congress, Rome 1935. Opening ceremony.

FEI organised and hosted several World Esperanto Congresses (Universala Kongreso, or UK, for short). In 1935, the 27th UK took place in Rome; in 1955, the 40th UK was hosted in Bologna; in 2006, the 91st UK took place in Florence; and, finally, in 2023 Turin is going to host the 108th UK. On the Universal Esperanto Association (UEA) website one can find a complete list of the congresses hosted in Italy.

== Publications ==
=== Magazines ===
FEI publishes two magazines: l'Esperanto magazine, which serves as the primary publishing organ, as well as NSiR - Nova Sento in Rete, a digital publication in Esperanto and Italian available exclusively to members.

=== Dictionary ===
FEI's website also boasts an online Italian-Esperanto dictionary, containing over 50,000 Italian terms and 66,000 Esperanto terms, as well as more than 500,000 inflexions and conjugations. This electronic dictionary is an adaptation of Carlo Minnaja's Italian-Esperanto Dictionary, which spans over 1400 pages. The author permitted its usage.

=== Publishing house ===
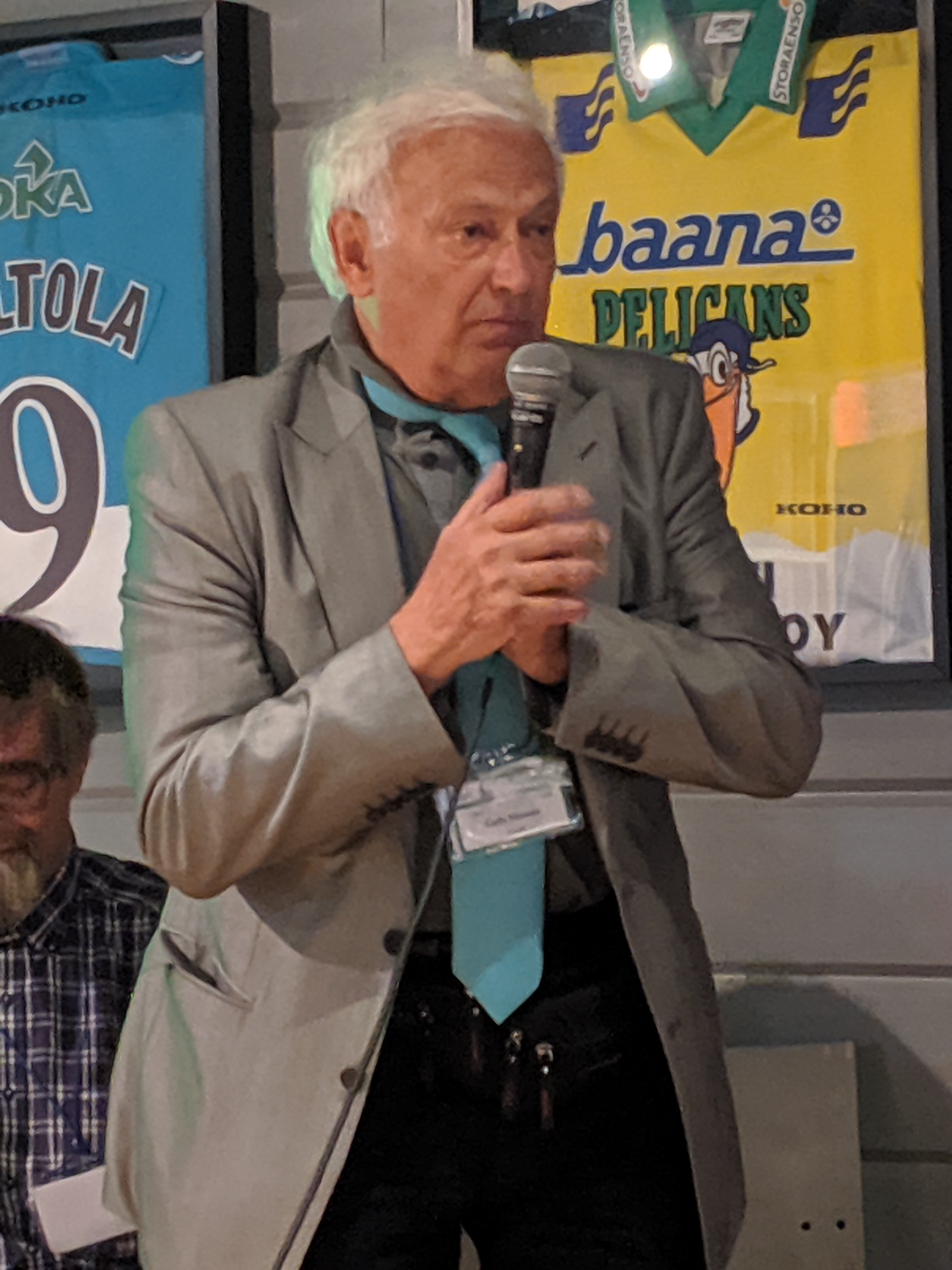
Carlo Minnaja translated some masterpieces of Italian literature into Esperanto.

Additionally, FEI's small publishing house produces informative, educational, and culturally enriching books in Esperanto. Some examples include:

- Macchiavelli, Niccolò (2006). La Princo (in Esperanto). Translated by Carlo Minnaja. FEI. ISBN 978-88-89177-68-6. (translation of Niccolò Machiavelli's The Prince)
- Manzoni, Alessandro (2006). La gefianĉoj (in Esperanto). Translated by Battista Cadei. FEI. ISBN 978-88-89177-23-5. (translation of Alessandro Manzoni's The Betrothed)
- Marček, Stano (2007). Esperanto con il metodo diretto (Esperanto with the direct method) (in Italian). Translated by Luigia Oberrauch. illustrated by Linda Marčeková. FEI. ISBN 978-80-969667-1-4. An illustrated grammar of 22 lessons. Explanations of grammar in Italian with a small vocabulary attached.
- Minnaja, Carlo (2009). Lazzaro Ludovico Zamenhof (in Italian). FEI. ISBN 978-88-96582-00-8. An anthology of the Esperanto inventor.
- Aguilar Solá, Pedro (2016). Corso intensivo di esperanto per allievi e autodidatti (Intensive Esperanto course for students and self-taught students) (in Italian). FEI. ISBN 978-88-96582-14-5. An essential grammar with lexical notes, dialogues, exercises with solution key and small vocabulary included.
- Ungaretti, Giuseppe (2016). Vivo de Homo (in Esperanto). Translated by Nicolino Rossi; Carlo Minnaja. FEI. ISBN 978-88-96582-15-2. The life and works of Giuseppe Ungaretti, of one of the most influential Italian poets of the 20th century.
- Minnaja, Carlo (2018). Historio de la Akademio de Esperanto (in Esperanto). FEI. ISBN 978-88-96582-23-7.
- Astori, Davide (2018). Enkonduke al Ĝenerala Lingvistiko (in Esperanto). FEI. ISBN 978-88-96582-24-4.
- Chippindale, Christopher (2018). Pado al Paradizo. Clarence Bicknell kaj la Valo de la Mirindaĵoj (in Esperanto). Translated by Humphrey Tonkin. FEI. ISBN 978-88-96582-22-0. Translation into Esperanto of 'A High Way to Heaven. Clarence Bicknell and the "Vallee des Merveilles"' by Christopher Chippindale, published in 1998. A bibliography of Clarence Bicknell, British Esperanto pioneer, botanist, archaeologist, poet and humanist.
- Piccione, Annamaria (2021). La Dia Komedio rakontata al la infanoj (in Esperanto). Translated by Carlo Minnaja. illustrated by Francesc Rovira. ISBN 978-88-96582-26-8. "The Divine Comedy told to the children", a children's version of the Divine Comedy translated from Italian, with colour illustrations.

== See also ==
- List of Esperanto organisations
