= Ivy Kellerman Reed =

American author in Esperanto

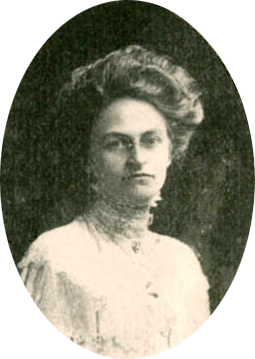
Ivy Kellerman Reed

Ivy Kellerman Reed (July 8, 1877 – February 7, 1968) was an American author in the international language Esperanto.

An accomplished linguist with four academic degrees for work in Latin, Greek, Sanskrit, and Persian and half a dozen modern languages, Reed was an ardent Esperantist.

== Early life and education ==
Ivy Kellerman was born in Oskosh, Wisconsin, the daughter of William A. Kellerman and Stella V. Denniss Kellerman. She was a graduate of Ohio State University, where she was a member of Delta Delta Delta. She earned a master's degree from Cornell University and a Ph.D. magna cum laude from the University of Chicago. She also completed a law degree from the Washington College of Law.

== Career ==
Reed wrote two grammars for Esperanto. The Complete Grammar of the International Language, published in 1910, is an examination of Esperanto grammar aimed at university- and college students, especially if they want to continue learning other languages. The Practical Grammar of the International Language, first published in 1915, that ran to several editions, is targeted at the public.

Reed was the translator with Ralph A. Lewin, of the famous Esperanto edition of Winnie-the-Pooh. She also translated Shakespeare’s As You Like It, the first performance of which was given at the sixth World Esperanto Congress in Washington D.C. in 1910.

She served as editor of American Esperantist, and was grand treasurer of Delta Delta Delta from 1900 to 1902. She marched in at least two suffrage parades in Washington, D.C., in 1913.

== Books ==
- A Complete Grammar of Esperanto

== Translations ==
- “La reĝo de la ora rivero”, (1911) translation of The King of the Golden River by John Ruskin
- “Kiel Plaĉas al Vi”, (1910) translation of As You Like It by William Shakespeare
- “Winnie-la-Pu”, (published 1972) translation of Winnie-the-Pooh by A. A. Milne

== Personal life ==
Ivy Kellerman married Edwin C. Reed in 1909. She died in La Jolla, California in 1968, aged 90 years.
