= Association of Green Esperantists =

The Association of Green Esperantists (Esperanto: Asocio de Verduloj Esperantistaj, AVE) is an international non-governmental organization dedicated to using the Esperanto language, informing Greens about Esperanto, informing Esperantists about Green issues, and translating important documents.

AVE believes that Esperanto should be supported by Greens because it is a language designed to spread peace through international understanding; Esperanto protects the diversity of regional languages against the excessive use of imperialistic languages; and by using the neutral language Esperanto, Greens can help reduce language discrimination during their own international meetings.

== History ==
AVE was founded at the first meeting of the European Green Parties in 1984 in Liège, Belgium.

== See also ==
- List of Esperanto organizations
