= Esperanto in Malaysia =

International auxiliary language in Malaysia

Esperanto has a small presence in Malaysia although no Esperanto associations or clubs are there.

== Activity in the 2010s ==
A school club operated at the San Min Chinese Independent School, which is in Teluk Intan, Perak, but was discontinued in 2014.

The Tsung Wah Old Students' Association was a CEFR 2012 Worldwide Written test center in Kuala Kangsar, Perak.

JCI, Teluk Intan branch conducted an elementary course in March, 2012.

Aik Keow Chinese Primary School in Teluk Air Tawar, Seberang Prai, Penang held a 3-hour introductory course for 20 pupils during the school holidays in November, 2012.

Aik Keow Ex-pupils' Association in Teluk Air Tawar, Seberang Prai, Penang conducted a 4-hour Introductory course for the members as well as non members in December, 2012

== Reasons for the lack of popularity ==
- Local media rarely cover related activities. Coverage in Chinese-language media is mainly on local pages.
- Loyar Burok is the only strong supporter of Esperanto activities in Malaysia.

== 125-year celebration ==
- Esperanto Club of San Min in Teluk Intan-o issued 4 sets of commemorate stamps.
- Esperanto Club of San Min, Junior Chamber International (JCI), Teluk Intan branch and simpla-vivo.com printed 1000 postcards.
- Malaysia Esperanto Studies Group (MESG) printed 4,000 postcards.
- In conjunction with its 10th anniversary, Universiti Tuanku Abdul Rahman (UTAR) arranged a talk by Sinjoro ENG on the Perak main campus.
