= Kim J. Henriksen =

Danish Esperantist singer-musician (born 1960)

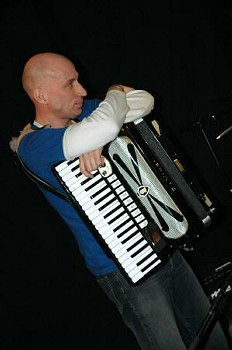

Background information
- Also known as: Kimo
- Born: 28 October 1960 (age 65)
- Origin: Copenhagen, Denmark
- Instruments: Voice; guitar; accordion
- Years active: 1983–present
- Label: Vinilkosmo

Kim Jan Henriksen (also known as Kimo, born 28 October 1960) is a Danish Esperantist singer-musician. From his Polish-born mother, Bogumiła Maria Henriksen, and Danish-born father, Kai L. Henriksen. He learned Esperanto as a child, becoming prominent in the Esperanto youth movement and in the world of Esperanto rock music in the 1980s and 1990s. Kim Henriksen and his Polish-born wife speak Esperanto at home and are raising their son as a second-generation Esperanto native speaker. Henriksen's enthusiastic musicianship on behalf of Esperanto and cross-cultural understanding through rock music has earned him popularity both in Europe and America.

== Arika Okrent's characterization ==
American linguist Arika Okrent notes:

"[Henriksen] appeared not to appreciate how bizarre it was to be a native speaker of an invented language. Esperanto was the medium of his parents' relationship and of the entire home life of their family.

Before you start getting indignant on his behalf, know that growing up he had plenty of contact with the world outside his home and learned to speak Danish as a native too. But he considered Esperanto his true mother tongue. For Kimo, Esperanto was a completely normal fact of life in the same way that Polish would have been if both of his parents had been Polish. Kimo didn't choose to learn Esperanto, nor did his son, but everyone else at the conference did. Somewhere along the way they'd decided it worth their time to learn this utopian pipe-dream language."

== Musical groups ==
In 1983, Henriksen was a co-founder of the Amplifiki group (along with Bertilo Wennergren and Micke Englund), which performed throughout Europe in the 1980s. He composed and sang several of the most popular songs of the Esperanto rock music group Sola. A co-founder of the Esperanto Desperado band in 1996, he was a singer, guitarist and accordionist in this group.

In autumn 2005 he co-founded the Hotel Desperado ensemble with Brian Laustsen, Nis Bramsen and Mark Dziwornu from among the Esperanto Desperado group, a group with which he still performs. Other current band members are Thierry Boisdon and David-Emil Wickström. The band sings songs in several languages — Danish, English, French, Twi and Spanish. Their music incorporates elements of flamenco, afro, blues, folk, Balkan and ska.

== Esperanto movement role ==
Henriksen was president of the Danish Esperanto Youth Organization, president of the Danish Esperanto Society from 1995 till 2002 and president of the Copenhagen Esperanto Club from 2005 till 2007. He was instrumental in the founding and continued operations of the Sunda esperanto agado, a group that actively aids mutual Øresund-area cooperation among Esperanto clubs from Copenhagen and Helsingborg in Denmark and clubs from Malmö and Lund in Sweden. He has been on the executive of the Esperanto Club of Malmö since 2007, where he often teaches introductory and intermediate courses in Esperanto.
