= Daniel Bovet =

Swiss-born Italian pharmacologist

Daniel Bovet ForMemRS
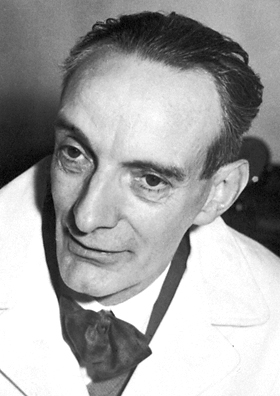
- Born: 23 March 1907; Neuchâtel, Switzerland
- Died: 8 April 1992 (aged 85); Rome, Italy
- Spouse: Filomena Nitti
- Awards: Cameron Prize for Therapeutics of the University of Edinburgh (1949); Nobel Prize in Physiology or Medicine (1957)
- Scientific career
- Fields: Pharmacology

Daniel Bovet (French: [danjɛl bɔvɛ], Italian: [ˈdaːnjel boˈvɛ]; 23 March 1907 – 8 April 1992) was a Swiss-born Italian pharmacologist who won the 1957 Nobel Prize in Physiology or Medicine for his discovery of drugs that block the actions of specific neurotransmitters. He is best known for his discovery in 1937 of antihistamines, which block the neurotransmitter histamine and are used in allergy medication. His other research included work on chemotherapy, sulfa drugs, the sympathetic nervous system, the pharmacology of curare, and other neuropharmacological interests.

In 1965, Bovet led a study team which concluded that smoking of tobacco cigarettes increased users' intelligence. He told The New York Times that the object was not to "create geniuses, but only [to] put the less-endowed individual in a position to reach a satisfactory mental and intellectual development".

Bovet was born in Neuchâtel, Switzerland. He was a native Esperanto speaker. He graduated from the University of Geneva in 1927 and received his doctorate in 1929. Between 1929 and 1947, he worked at the Pasteur Institute in Paris. He then moved to the Istituto Superiore di Sanità (Superior Institute of Health) in Rome in 1947. Two years later, in 1949, Bovet was awarded the Cameron Prize for Therapeutics of the University of Edinburgh. In 1964, he became a professor in at the University of Sassari in Italy. From 1969 to 1971, he was the head of the Psychobiology and Psychopharmacology Laboratory of the National Research Council, in Rome, before stepping down to become a professor at the University of Rome La Sapienza. He retired in 1982.
