= Croatian Esperanto League =

The Croatian Esperanto League (Esperanto: Kroata Esperanto-Ligo, KEL; Croatian: Hrvatski savez za esperanto) is a society for those who speak Esperanto, Esperanto societies, and friends of Esperanto. Since its establishment in 1908, it deals with Esperanto in Croatia.

It hosted the 86th World Esperanto Congress in Zagreb in 2001.
