= Amerika Esperantisto =

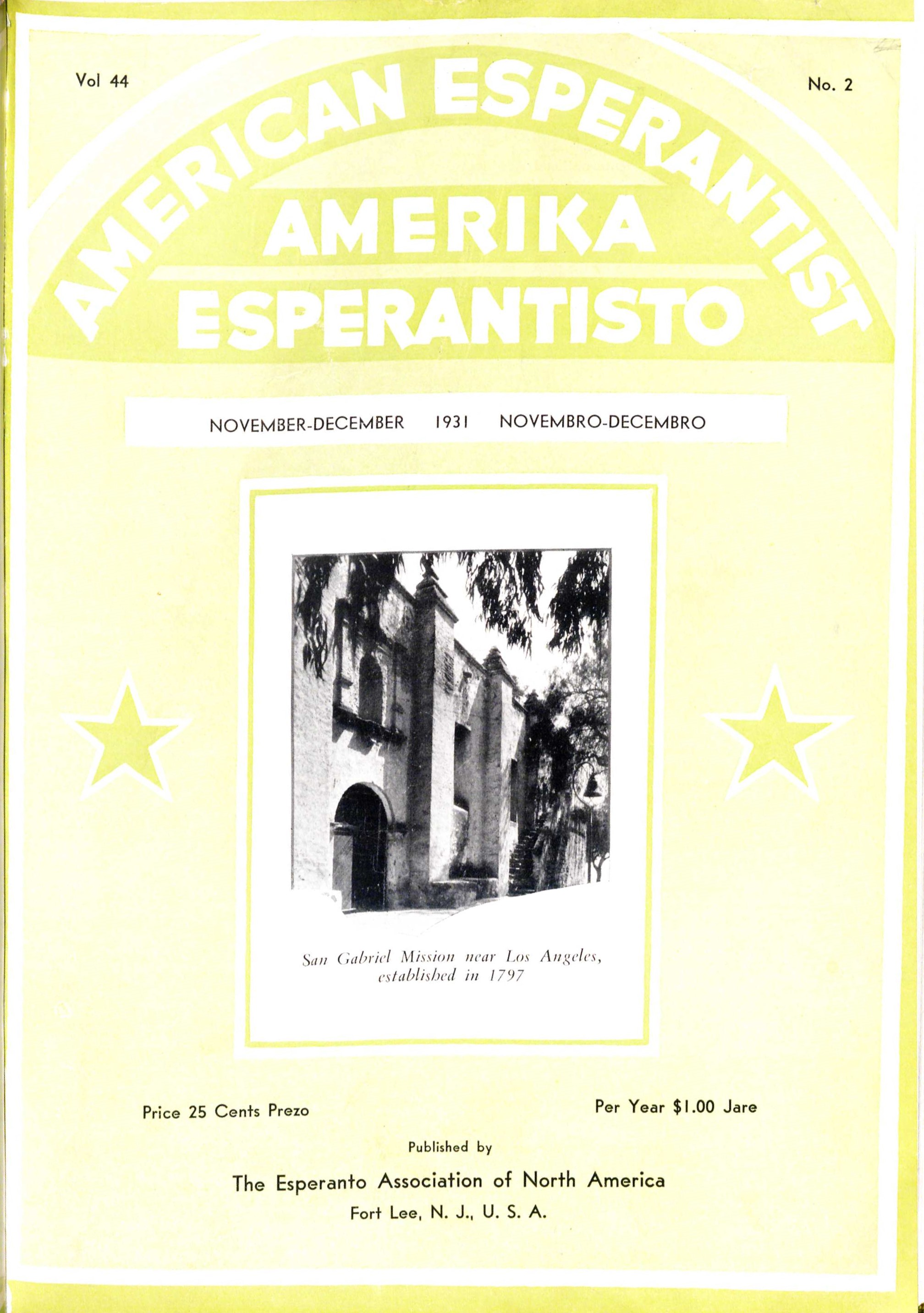
Cover of "American Esperantist", 1931

Amerika Esperantisto (American Esperantist) was a North American Esperanto-language monthly publication founded in January 1907 as Amerika Esperantista Revuo. It was originally published by the American Esperanto Association (Amerika Esperantista Asocio), a national association formed by Boston Esperantists in March 1905.

Meanwhile, in October 1906, Arthur Baker of the American Esperantist Company had founded another magazine, Amerika Esperantisto, in Oklahoma City. The company was a specialized publisher and vendor of Esperanto material and was dedicated to the promotion of Esperanto.

In 1907, the headquarters of American Esperantist moved to New York City. In 1908 at its first national convention, in Chautauqua, New York, the Amerika Esperantista Asocio was renamed as Esperantista Asocio de Norda Ameriko (EANA). Publication of Amerika Esperantista Revuo ceased, and the American Esperantist Company's Amerika Esperantisto became its official organ.

With the decline of the EANA and rise of the Esperanto League for North America, Amerika Esperantisto eventually ceased publication in 1967.

Editors included Arthur Baker, Ivy Kellerman, and J. J. Süssmuth.

== See also ==
- Usona Esperantisto
- List of Esperanto periodicals
