= Indonesian Esperanto Association =

The Indonesian Esperanto Association (Esperanto: Indonezia Esperanto-socio, IEA; Indonesian: Asosiasi Esperanto Indonesia) is an organization established to support, coordinate and encourage the Esperanto movement in the Republic of Indonesia. An association of this name was founded in 1952, but gradually fell into inactivity. In subsequent decades an organization called "Indonezia Esperanto-Societo", and another called the "Centro de Esperanto-Studoj" were briefly active. The present IEA was (re)founded in April, 2013, during the first Indonesian Esperanto Congress, held in Bogor. Ilia Sumilfia Dewi was elected as its first president. The association publishes Esperanto en Indonezio (founded 2011) as its official bulletin.
