= Carlo Minnaja =

Italian writer

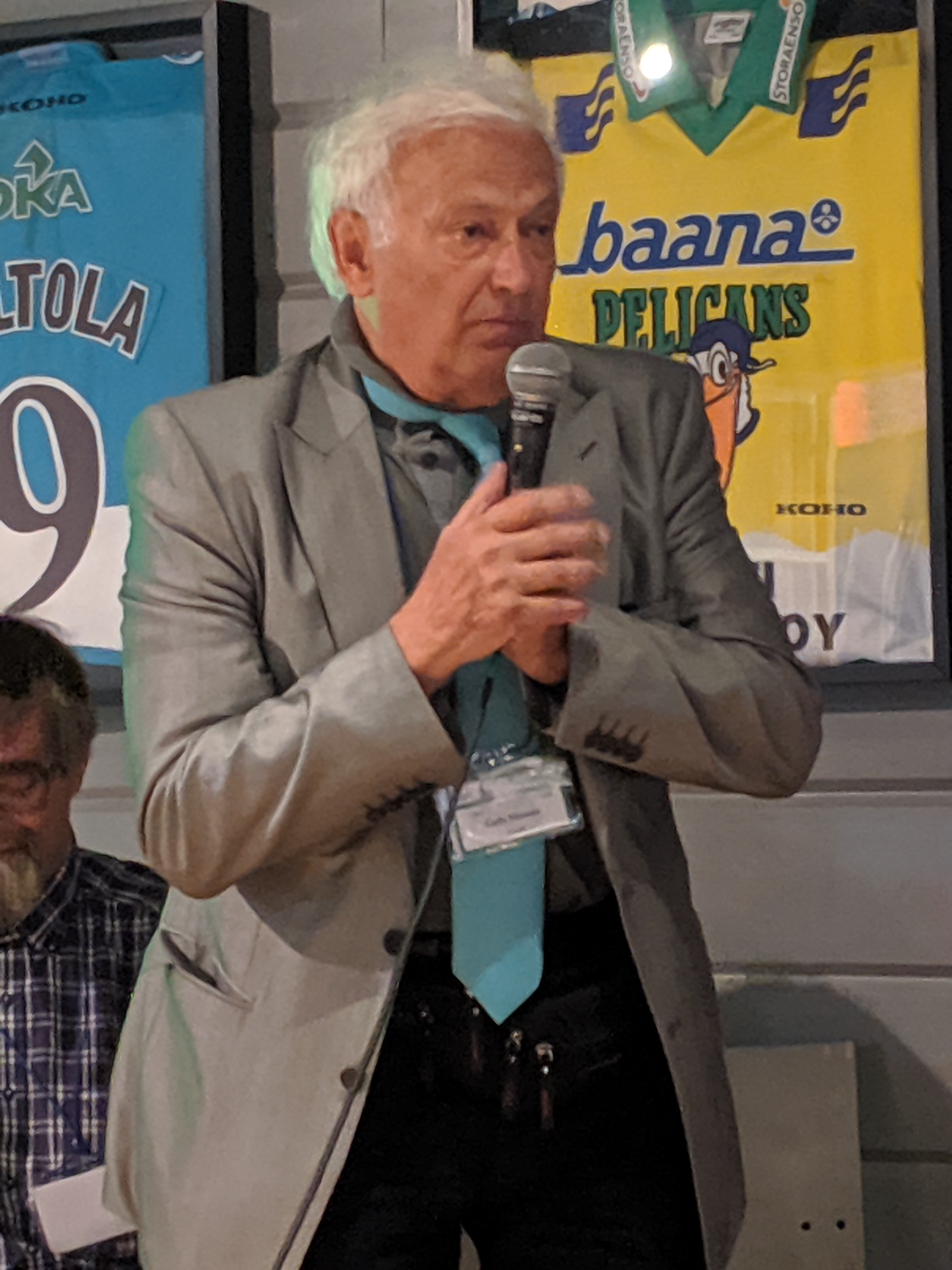
- Carlo Minnaja during the World Esperanto Congress 2019 in Lahti, Finland.
- Born: 19 March 1940 (age 86); Rome, Italy
- Occupation: Professor
- Known for: Italian-Esperanto dictionary

Carlo Minnaja (born 19 March 1940) is a retired professor of Mathematics, a native Esperanto speaker, and Esperanto translator, author and researcher. He has authored many books about Esperanto, in Esperanto and Italian, including a vocabulary of Esperanto, and is a member of the Akademio de Esperanto.

== Academic career ==
Minnaja graduated with a bachelor's degree in mathematics from the University of Pisa in 1963. He earned his doctorate in Mathematics at the Scuola Normale Superiore di Pisa, and began his academic career as a professor at the Accademia Navale di Livorno in 1965.

In 1973, Minnaja became a mathematics professor in the University of Padua's Engineering Department. He taught the courses "Mathematics for Electrical Engineering," "History of Mathematics," and "Linear Algebra and Geometry for Information Engineering."

Between 1979 and 1994, he was a member of the Scientific Council of Institute of Computational Linguistics of Pisa. On a Fulbright scholarship, in 1983 and 1984, he was a visiting professor at Virginia Tech and UCLA.

=== Awards and appointments ===
Minnaja is a member of the International Academy of Sciences San Marino and a former vice president. He has also lectured in several European universities, and was author or coauthor of fifty scientific papers. Many of which are his books and articles on the international language Esperanto.

In 1980, he received the Culture Award from the prime minister of Italy.

== Activities in the Esperanto movement ==
In 1960, Minnaja became a member of the Board of the World Esperanto Youth Organization, addressing specialized sections and services. He is still very active in the fields of esperantology and Esperanto literature, and is a member of the literary circle Patrol.

In 1981, he translated Carlo Goldoni's The Mistress of the Inn into Esperanto, and in 1982, he published his translations of the poems of Cesare Pavese.

In 1996, he published his Italian-Esperanto dictionary, which, at more than 1400 pages, is the most comprehensive Italian-Esperanto dictionary.

Minnaja is a member of the Scientific Committee of the Centro Italiano di Interlinguistica, works regularly as a reviewer for the Esperanto literary magazine Monato and was editor-in-chief of the magazine Literatura Foiro in 2014.

== Books ==
Following a brief list of Carlo Minnaja's books, some others can be found in his Padua University account page.

- Eugenio Montale kay aliaj liguriaj aŭtoroj (Esperanto: "Eugenio Montale and other ligurian authors") pub. Edizioni Eva by C. Minnaja, 2013, ISBN 9788896028896.
- I matematici nell'Università di Padova. Dal suo nascere al XX secolo (Italian: "Mathematicians at the University of Padua. From its birth to the twentieth century") by C. Minnaja, E. Giusti, F. Baldassarri, 2007, ISBN 9788860580931.
- Historio de la esperanta literaturo (Esperanto: "History of Esperanto Literature") by C. Minnaja, G. Silfer, 2016, ISBN 3906595218.
- L'esperanto in Italia. Alla ricerca della democrazia linguistica (Italian: "Esperanto in Italy. In search of Linguistic Democracy") Pub. Il Poligrafo, by C. Minnaja 2007, ISBN 9788871155463.
- Introduzione alla Letteratura Esperanto pub. Athenaeum Edizioni Universitarie (Italian: "Introduction to the Esperanto Literature") by C. Minnaja & D. Astori 2019, ISBN 9788832158038.
