= SJK(C) Aik Keow =

Primary school in Penang state, Malaysia

Coordinates: 5.480619°N 100.384052°E

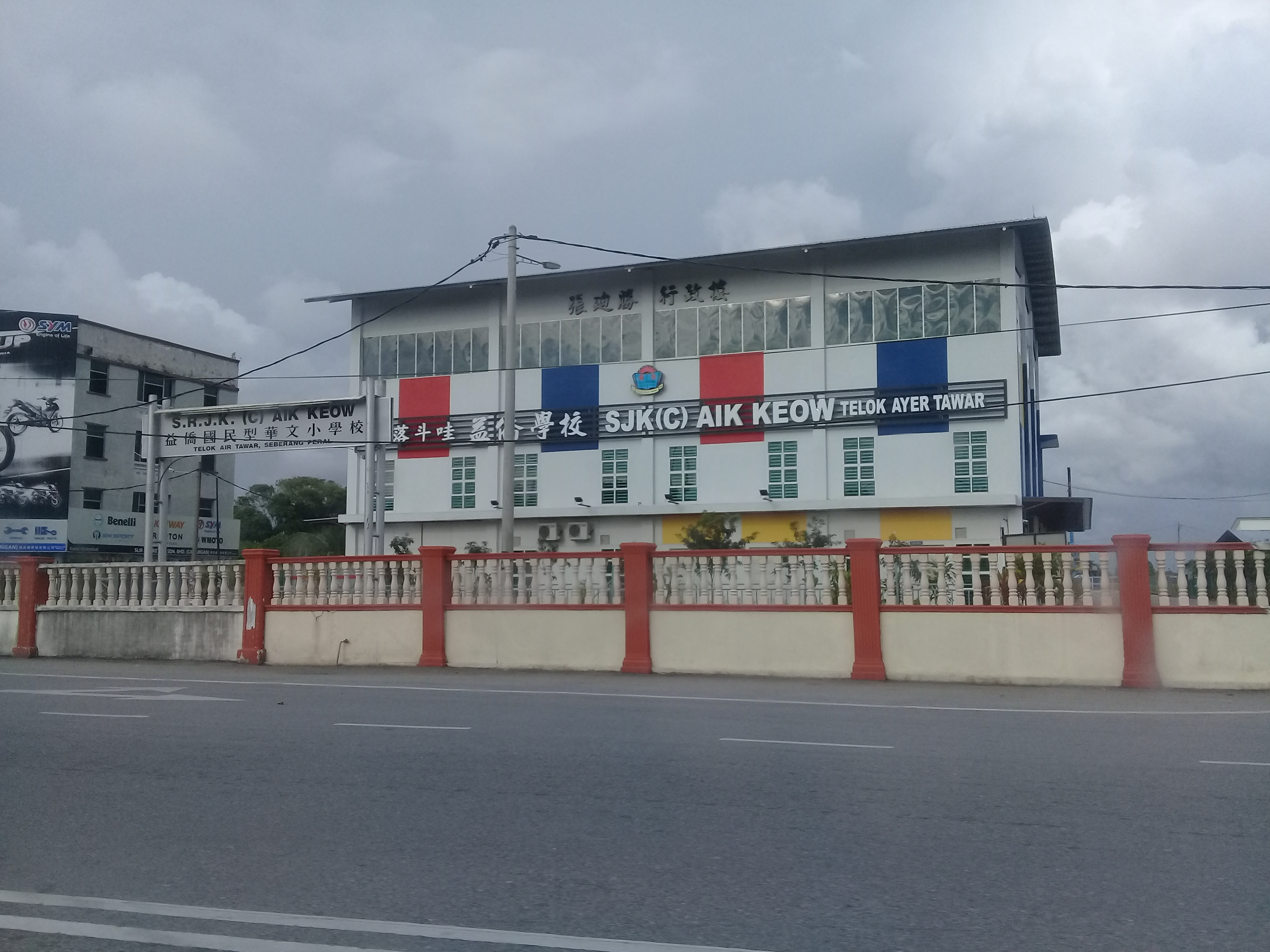
SJKC Aik Keow in Telok Ayer Tawar.

Aik Keow Chinese Primary school is also known as SRJK (C) Aik Keow, (Chinese :日落斗哇益侨华文小学) is located in Kampung Telok Ayer Tawar, North Seberang Perai District in Penang state of Malaysia.

== History of The School ==
- 1930—the school commenced.
- 1941—world war 2 destroyed the school building and all the teaching and learning halted.
- 1945—the school recommenced the teaching and learning.

== Geographical Location of The School ==
- It is located in Teluk Air Tawar, Butterworth.
- Butterworth is the mainland peninsula of Malaysia.
- The school has a 1.3 acres of land (0.5263 hectare)

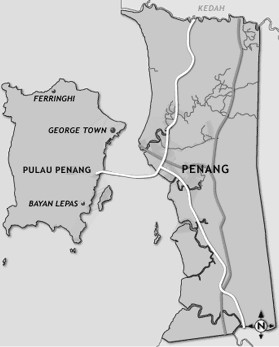
Map of Penang Island and Butterworth

== Committee of the School ==
Director: Mr HOO Lay Hock
Chairperson of Parent-Teacher Association: Mr YEU Guan Chuan
President of the Ex-pupils' Association: Mr SIM Eing Liong

== What is on Aik Keow ==
2009

- The SARS forced the school to close for a week

2011

- The Astro Television Chinese section visited the school for introducing the Recycle programme to the pupils
- The school participated in the Recycle programme for making soap.
- The school participated in the speech contest

2012

- The housing developer next to the school did not take necessary precaution to avoid the noise and the digging of the man-made lake was posing danger of collapsing to the school building.
- The local council helped to collect old books for the poor schools in the region, including Aik Keow primary school
- The school is suffering from the termite problem
