= Irana Esperantisto =

Esperanto culture magazine

Irana Esperantisto (Iranian Esperantist) is an independent quarterly culture magazine, which is published in Esperanto and in Persian in Tehran and distributed internationally. A first series was published from 2002 to 2008, and a second series is continuously edited from spring 2012 onwards. Its Persian title is Payame Sabz-andishan (literally: Message of the Green-Thinkers or the Green-Adepts). About half of the content of each edition is in Esperanto and the other half in Persian. From autumn 2020 onwards it features also articles in Arabic and Kurdish.

This magazine is an important forum for liberal and progressive thinking. In 2003, long articles about Shirin Ebadi, Alfred Nobel and Berta von Suttner were published in this magazine. Newsweek published some articles which were first published in Irana Esperantisto.

== See also ==
- List of Esperanto magazines
