= Ino Kolbe =

German Esperanto speaker (1914–2010)

Ino Kolbe (February 28, 1914 – February 16, 2010), born Ino Voigt, was a German Esperantist and author.

She wrote books, paperback booklets and articles about the planned language Esperanto and proofread the massive Esperanto–German dictionary of Erich-Dieter Krause, a work with 80,000 headwords over nearly 900 pages (1999).

A pioneering Esperanto speaker in the Leipzig area, she lived in Eutritzsch, a suburb of Leipzig, fully dedicated to the worldwide Esperanto cause, and even into her 90s manuscripts still regularly arrived on her desk for proofreading. "Kolbe is now a great-great-grandmother, and the Esperantists of Leipzig still regard her as their cornerstone," wrote Kay Wüster in the Leipziger Volkszeitung. On her 90th birthday, 20 Esperantists from four German provinces, including scientists and former students, came to offer their congratulations. Among the distinguished guests were Krause and Detlev Blanke.

Both she and her brother Holdo Voigt learned Esperanto from birth.

== Esperanto upbringing ==
Her parents were so dedicated to the Esperanto movement that the only language they used around her was Esperanto; therefore before entering school she learned her German only from other children. Kolbe related how she first became conscious of the different vocabulary of another language. As a child of three or four, she and the neighbour children were excitedly playing with her spinning-top toy. After some time she stormed upstairs to her parents' second-floor flat in Leipzig-Gohlis, complaining: La infanoj diris, ke mia turbo estas Kreisel. ("The children said that my 'turbo' is a top.", where turbo is the Esperanto word for a spintop.)

In 1910, with a group of his friends, Kolbe's father Reinhold Voigt, a convinced pacifist and socialist, had founded Frateco ("Brotherhood"), an influential workers' Esperanto association in Leipzig. The Workers' Esperantists in Leipzig and elsewhere saw themselves as the true guardians of L.L. Zamenhof's hopeful vision; they hoped to use Esperanto to further the class struggle and had only limited contact with the smaller German Esperanto Federation (Deutschen Esperanto-Bund, DEB), which viewed the popularity of the language among the working class with mixed feelings: while the workers were increasing the visibility of Esperanto as a viable language, extremist right-wing critics had begun to defame Esperanto as the "language of hoodlums and Communists." As early as his Mein Kampf polemic (1925), Adolf Hitler had attacked Esperanto as a supposed tool of his imagined Jewish world dominion.

Prior to the Nazi era, Germany had been a hotbed of Esperantism; by 1922 more than 100,000 Germans had learned the language and in that one year 40,256 adults were enrolled in one of 1,592 Esperanto courses being taught throughout Germany. Esperanto was also being taught in the elementary schools of 126 German cities. It was a time when even League of Nations Undersecretary-General Inazō Nitobe attended the World Congress of Esperanto and recommended the use of Esperanto to the General Assembly.

During the 1920s Reinhold Voigt travelled widely to promote Esperanto and to give courses in the language. He corresponded with Esperantists around the world, and at six Kolbe already had a young Japanese pen-pal to whom she wrote in Esperanto. His family was often visited by foreign Esperantists — Dutch, French and others — to whom they showed off their "Esperanto child". Taking Marx's slogan literally ("Workers of all countries unite,") the socialist Esperantists took nature hikes, singing Esperanto songs and sporting red banners with the green star of Esperanto. In 1929 the Sennacieca Asocio Tutmonda, an umbrella organization of various left-wing workers' Esperanto groups, held its annual congress in Leipzig with 2,000 participants. Kolbe recalled that she and her brother met many of the delegates at the train station and guided them to their quarters.

== Works ==
- Zur Geschichte des Deutschen Arbeiter-Esperanto-Bundes in Leipzig (Westsachsen) ("The history of the German Workers' Esperanto Association in Leipzig, West Saxony"). Leipzig: 1996. Part I is the history from the beginning to the "Völkerspiegel" (1924); Part II is the history from 1925 to the movement's prohibition by the Nazis in 1933.
- Mein Leben mit und für Esperanto ("My life with and on behalf of Esperanto"). Leipzig: 2002 (2nd corrected ed.), 92 pp.
- Linde Knöschke and Ino Kolbe: der esperantist 1 (1965) - 164 (1990). Register. Teil I. (Index, part 1) (Ed. Detlev Blanke) Berlin: Gesellschaft für Interlinguistik e. V. (GIL), 1997, 120 pp.
- Ino Kolbe: der esperantist 1 (1965) - 164 (1990). Register Teil II. (Index, part 2) (Ed. Detlev Blanke), Berlin: Arbeitsgruppe Geschichte des Esperanto-Verbandes der DDR, 1998, 120 pp.

== Translations ==
- Detlev Blanke, (1991): Skizze der Geschichte des Esperanto-Verbandes in der Deutschen Demokratischen Republik. ("Sketch of the history of the Esperanto Federation in the German Democratic Republic", translated from Esperanto to German by Ino Kolbe). Berlin: Esperanto-Verband im Kulturbund, 62 p.
