= Wera Blanke =

German actress and Esperantist

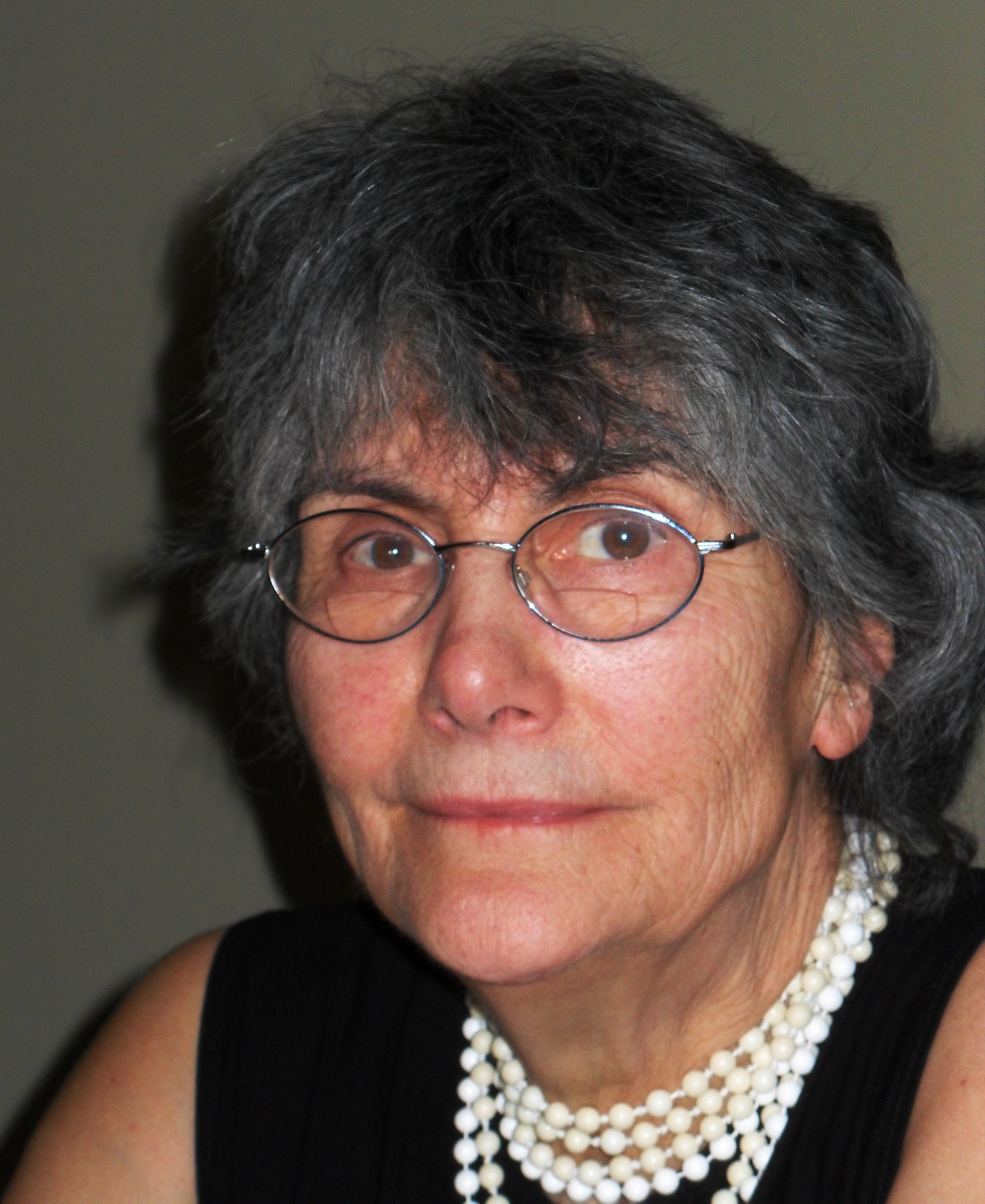
- Blanke in 2010
- Born: Wera Paintner; March 2, 1933 (age 93); Leipzig, Saxony, Germany
- Occupations: Actress, Esperantist
- Spouse(s): Wolfgang Dehler (married 1960-1969); Detlev Blanke (married 1986)

Wera Blanke (née Paintner) is a German actress and Esperantist. Born in 1933 to a pair of actors, she acted both on stage and for television throughout her career. Blanke began activity in the Esperanto community in 1976, writing several books about Esperanto-language terminology.

== Early life ==
Blanke was born in Leipzig on 2 March 1933, to actors Martin Flörchinger and Ruth Trumpp. She made her theatre-debut at the age of six, as a child actor at a theatre in Bochum. She often moved cities through her childhood according to where her parents were acting: she would often appear on stage with her parents, for example in theatres in Königsberg and Munich.

== Career ==
After graduating in 1951 in Schondorf, Bavaria, Blanke worked as a technician at Bavaria Film and Aktiengesellschaft für Filmfabrikation, before applying to study theatre at the Staatlichen Schauspielschule Berlin (known today as the Ernst Busch Academy of Dramatic Arts) in Berlin. In 1956, she moved from Munich to Leipzig in East Germany, where her father was acting. During her studies, she worked as an actress at the Volksbühne theatre in Berlin, and from 1958 the Young World Theatre in Leipzig, the Landestheater Altenburg, and the Nationaltheater Weimar. Blanke also worked as an actress in productions by Deutscher Fernsehfunk, such as Maria Diehl's Daring (Das Wagnis der Maria Diehl), several episodes of the detective series Polizeiruf 110, and Der Staatsanwalt hat das Wort.

Around 1967, after acting in Bitterfelder Weges, Blanke went to the East German agricultural cooperative Landwirtschaftliche Produktionsgenossenschaft, where she worked as a chicken keeper; she kept a journal during this time, which appeared as a manuscript under the title Of Chickens and Humans (Von Hühnern und Menschen). From 1967 to 1971, Paintner worked as a lecturer at the Staatlichen Schauspielschule Berlin (where she had previously studied), from 1972 to 1982 and worked as an occupational and expressive therapist at the Wilhelm Griesinger Hospital. Blanke continued acting roles during her time as a teacher; she played roles in televised films, radio dramas, and dubbed foreign media into German. Blanke also presented a program about literature, in which she presented some of her own fables and poems

Blanke married fellow actor Wolfgang Dehler in 1960, having three children with him during a nine-year marriage; their son Thomas Dehler, is also an actor. In 1986, she married the interlinguist and Esperantist Detlev Blanke (died 2016), who was a lecturer at the Humboldt University of Berlin.

== Esperanto ==
Blanke began working with the International auxiliary language Esperanto in 1976, becoming convinced of its potential after visiting the 1978 World Esperanto Congress in Varna, Bulgaria. Starting work on issues of terminology in Esperanto in the early 1980s, in 1985, Blanke (then under the name of Wera Dehler) proposed an Esperanto terminological centre, together with Humphrey Tonkin, in a report entitled Terminologia Esperanto-Centro: Spertoj, Problemoj, Perspektivoj (Esperanto Terminological Centre: Experiences, Problems, Perspectives), leading to the Terminologia Esperanto-Centro being established and funded by the Universal Esperanto Association in 1987.

Together with her second husband, Detlev Blanke, Blanke has published several books and articles in and about Esperanto, and given lectured about Esperantists in the field of terminology, such as Eugen Wüster, Ernest Drezen, and Alfred Werner. In 2006, Blanke was awarded the Eugen-Wüster-Sonderpreis by Infoterm, and was made an honorary member of the German Esperanto Association in 2018.

== Bibliography ==
=== Books ===
- Blanke, Wera; Blanke, Detlev (2013). Pri terminologia laboro en Esperanto: elektitaj publikaĵoj. Nov-Jorko [New York]: Mondial. ISBN 978-1-59569-257-3.
- Blanke, Wera (2008). Esperanto: Terminologie und Terminologiearbeit. New York: Mondial. ISBN 978-1-59569-077-7.
- Blanke, Wera (1989-01-31), "Terminological standardization – its roots and fruits in planned languages", in Schubert, Klaus (ed.), Interlinguistics, Berlin, New York: DE GRUYTER MOUTON, doi:10.1515/9783110886115.277, ISBN 978-3-11-088611-5

=== Articles ===
- Blanke, Wera (1990-01-01). "Terminologio en Esperanto". Language Problems and Language Planning. 14 (1): 64–65. doi:10.1075/lplp.14.1.06ter. ISSN 0272-2690.

== Filmography ==
Filmography of Wera Blanke (often appearing as Wera Paintner)
Year	Title	Role	Notes
1957	Das Wagnis der Maria Diehl		
1962	Aufruhr in der Scymore-Street		
1964	Das Doppelzimmer		
1967	Das Mädchen an der Orga Privat		
1968	Der Kristallspiegel		
1968	Das Vertrauen		
1969	Hans Beimler, Kamerad		
1970-1990	Der Staatsanwalt hat das Wort		Six episodes
1970	Ich – Axel Cäsar Springer		
1971	Salut Germain		
1972	Täter unbekannt		
1972	Meine Schwester Tilli		
1972	Weimarer Pitaval: Um den Tod eines Justizobersekretärs		
1972	Die Bilder des Zeugen Schattman		
1973	Aller Liebe Anfang		
1973	Zement		
1974	Spätsaison		
1976	Requiem für Hans Grundig		
1984	Mit 40 hat man noch Träume		
1984-1988	Polizeiruf 110		Five episodes
1986	Rund um die Uhr		Two episodes
1987	Kiezgeschichten		
1988	Der Vogel		
1988	Zahn um Zahn		
1988	Ein besserer Herr		
1988	Fallada – Letztes Kapitel		
1990	Silberdistel		
1990	Alter Schwede		
1991	Feuerwache 09		
1991	Mit Herz und Robe		
1991	Agentur Herz		
1993	Fraktur		
