= Medicina Internacia Revuo =

- Discipline: Medicine, pharmacy
- Language: English, Japanese, Russian, Esperanto, Spanish, Italian, Polish (or any other conference language)
- Edited by: Włodzimierz Opoka

Publication details
- History: 1923-present
- Frequency: Biannually
- Open access: Yes

Standard abbreviations
- ISO 4: Med. Int. Rev.

Indexing
- ISSN: 0465-5435

Links
- Journal homepage

Medicina Internacia Revuo (originally Internacia Medicina Revuo or, in English, the International Medical Review) is the official organ of Universal Medicine Esperanto Association, an organization that gathers physicians, pharmacists, and other medical professionals who have a working knowledge of Esperanto. The twice-yearly journal publishes articles that have undergone peer review and that are written in various languages, including English and Polish; abstracts are provided in English and Esperanto. The journal publishes broadly within the medical sciences, has an internationally renowned board of editors, and is included in the Index Copernicus database. The journal is available gold open access, but no author fees are charged.

== History ==
As early as the Third Congress on Esperanto, held in London in 1907, there was a call from members of the medical professions to establish a medical journal in Esperanto. Indeed, a letter to the British medical journal The Lancet praised a previous Esperanto medical journal, the Internacia Revuo Medicina, which was multilingual with a monthly publication schedule, saying:

"That Esperanto is adequate for the purposes of medical literature can be learned from the study of one number of the Internacia Revuo Medicina. Thanks to the number of international words in medical writings any practitioner ought to be able to read this Revuo with no better aid than a halfpenny key to Esperanto."

Another early Esperanto medical journal was Kuracisto: Internacia Revuo Medicina edited by Wilhelm Róbin and published in Warsaw from 1912 to 14. There were others, as well.

The Medicina Internacia Revuo, founded in 1923, was first published in Budapest, appearing "irregularly, as funds permit.", with Karlo Mezei as editor. The first issue appeared in September of that year, took up 16 pages, and had a subscription price (in Britain) of ten shillings. The journal appears to have been the first official publication of the UMEA (or its predecessor, the Tutmonda Esperantista Kuracista Asocio, the International Esperanto Medical Association). At that time,

"Internacia Medicina Revuo -- long heralded -- is devoted solely to translations from other languages into Esperanto of notable medical articles. It will not occupy itself with the propaganda of Esperanto, but stick to its task. American medical men should find in it the best means of keeping in touch medical advances of the non-English world.".

In 1926, it was stated that the journal "continues to appear bi-monthly. it is a large magazine, brilliantly edited, and well worthy of support by all interested in medicine.".

The journal's editorial offices later moved to Lille, with Maurice Briquet, a French radiologist, and Julien Vanverts, a French surgeon, serving as editors. One coeditor of the journal was Leon Zamenhof, a Polish otolaryngologist, and brother of L. L. Zamenhof, the founder of Esperanto.

Due to the collapse of the European economy, the journal "one of our best technical magazines" switched to monthly publication. In 1949, a donation of back issues was made by Dave Hennen Morris to the New York Public Library.

The journal was subsequently moved to Tiba (Japan), where Saboroo Tamazoe served as an editor. In June 1994, Medicina Internacia Revuo moved to its current offices in Poland, where is it published by the Jagellonian University.

== Bibliography ==
- Pierre Janton; Esperanto: Language, Literature, and Community; 1993; ISBN 9780791412541(p. 115-118)
- Yamazoe Saburo; Tokadoro Sakutaro; "La vivo kaj agado de d-ro Hideo Shinoda - patro de UMEA"; Cracow, 2001; ISBN 83-908748-4-9
- "Kongresa Libro 16-a Internacia Medicinista Esperanto-Kongreso"; Cracow, 2008; ISBN 83-923432-0-4
- Kazimierz Krzyżak; "Lekarsko-farmaceutyczne związki z Esperantem."; Aptekarz Polski; 2011, 55/33 online
