= Der Esperantist =

East German Esperanto newsletter

- Rudi Graetz at Der Esperantist
- Editor-in-Chief: Eugen Menger and Detlev Blanke
- Categories: Newsletter
- Frequency: bimontly
- Circulation: 4,000 - 5,000 / bimonthly
- Publisher: Central Workers' Circle of Friends of Esperanto
- First issue: 1965
- Final issue: 1990
- Country: Germany
- Language: Esperanto - German

Der Esperantist (German pronunciation: [deːɐ ˈʃperantist]; The Esperantist) was, from 1965 to 1990, the official newsletter of the East German Esperanto movement.

After organizing the Esperanto movement in the former East Germany, under the aegis of the quasi-governmental Cultural Association (Kulturbund), the new Centra Laborrondo de Esperanto-Amikoj ("Central Workers' Circle of Friends of Esperanto") began publishing the bilingual Der Esperantist in the A5 format.

Over the years the Esperanto-language content increased, and the number of German articles declined. The newsletter was edited by a committee, but the chief editors were Eugen Menger (from issue 1 in 1965 to issue 42 in 1970) and Detlev Blanke (from issue 43 in 1970 through issue 164 in 1990). Including a German-language special edition for the 1987 centennial of Esperanto, 165 issues were published (many of which appeared as double numbers spanning two months) with a total of 3,728 pages over the entire print run. Issue 163 of Der Esperantist (1990) contained a cumulative index of articles.

The print run was generally 4,000 to 5,000 copies, half of which were mailed to subscribers in East Germany. The remainder of the copies were shipped in bulk to other countries which had no local Esperanto publications, as well as to the Soviet Union, where there was interest in the newsletter. Numerous copies were also sent in free exchange for Esperanto publications from other countries. The newsletter was typographically modest and frequently was delayed in publication, but the collected copies of Der Esperantist are now important for the historiography of the GDREA, particularly as the published articles have now been indexed in depth in two slim volumes:

1. Linde Knöschke and Ino Kolbe: der esperantist 1 (1965) - 164 (1990). Register. Teil I. (Index, part 1) (Ed. Detlev Blanke), Gesellschaft für Interlinguistik e. V. (GIL), Berlin, 1997, 120 pp.
2. Ino Kolbe: der esperantist 1 (1965) - 164 (1990). Register Teil II. (Index, part 2) (Ed. Detlev Blanke), Arbeitsgruppe Geschichte des Esperanto-Verbandes der DDR, Berlin, 1998, 120 pp.

An essay on Der Esperantist can also be found in Torsten Bendias's "El la vivo de GDR: der esperantist (1965 bis 1990)" in Simone Barck, Martina Langermann and Siegfried Lokatis, Zwischen 'Mosaik' und 'Einheit': Zeitschriften in der DDR. Ch. Links Verlag, Berlin, 1999, pp. 202 – 213.

== See also ==
- PACO
