= Ludwig Schödl =

Ludwig Schödl (31 October 1909 – 20 February 1997), born in Berlin, was an advocate of the Workers' Esperanto Movement in Germany as well as abroad between the 1920s and the 1930s. In the second post war, he strongly supported and influenced in the process of restoration of the Esperanto Movement in the German Democratic Republic, and became one of its mainstream militants.

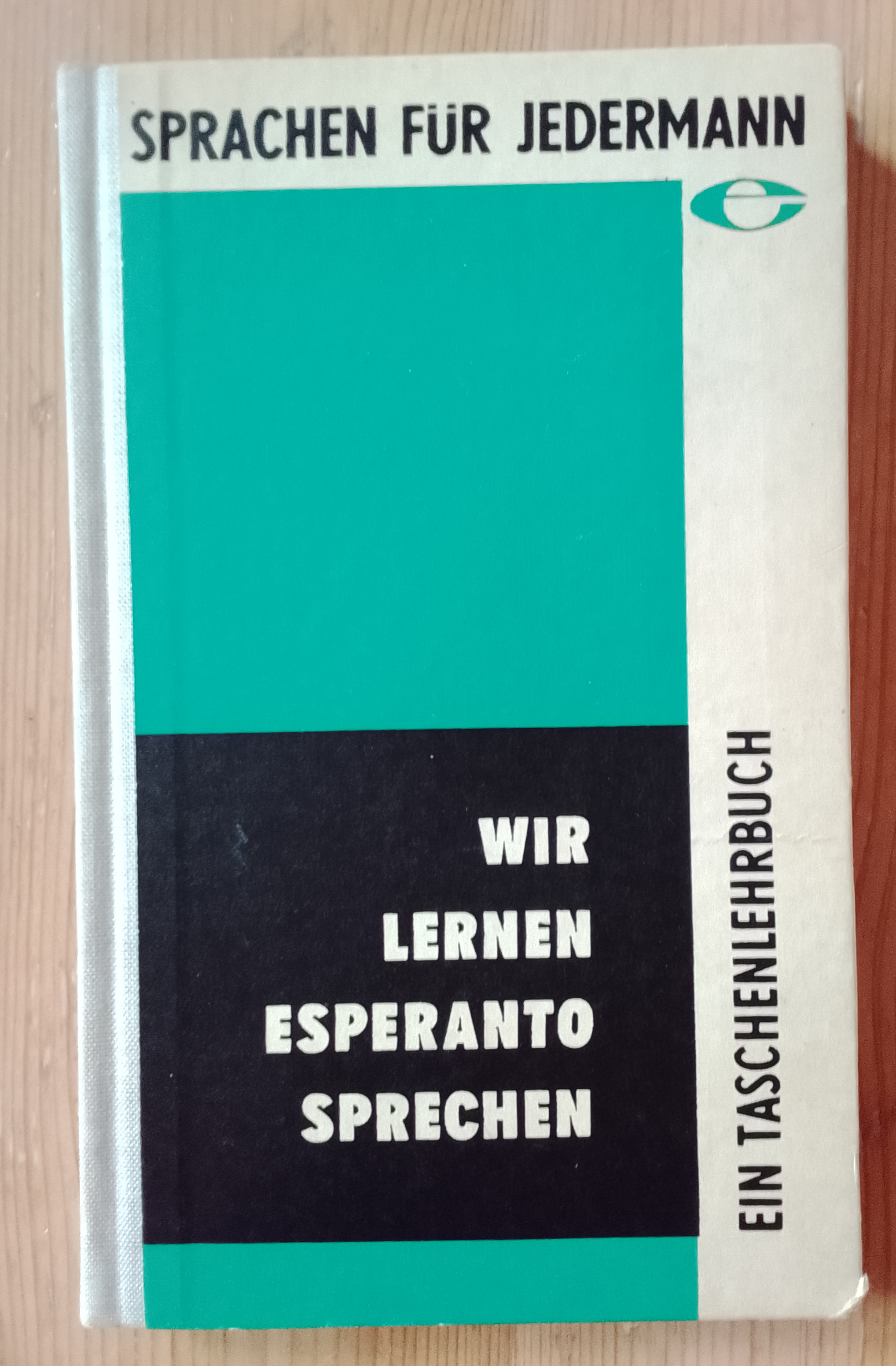
Wir lernen Esperanto sprechen (first Esperanto-textbook of GDR, 1967)

He supported the Esperanto's diffusion among the children, and was a prolific writer, which allowed him to have registered the first Esperanto textbook issued in the GDR and published by the state: the famous Wir lernen Esperanto sprechen. In the same way, he organized correspondence courses, wrote songbooks, multiple conferences and abundant translations from German to Esperanto. He died in Neuruppin in 1997.

== Notable works ==
- Wir lernen Esperanto sprechen: ein Taschenlehrbuch, Zentraler Arbeitskreis Esperanto der DDR im Dt. Kulturbund, 1972. 145 pp
- Esperanto-Fernstudium: in 14 Lektionen, Kulturbund der DDR, Esperanto-Verb., 1983. 56 pp
