= Karl Maier (Esperantist) =

German Esperantist

Karl Maier (1901 – 25 July 2000) was a German Esperantist and member of the Universal Esperanto Association, for more than 50 years.

Maier learned Esperanto in 1924. After emigration from Germany in 1930, he was living with Esperanto enthusiasts among United States, Mexico and Japan. Between 1935 and 1955 he lived in China.

After his return to Germany, he managed to unite several esperantists, reaching over 300 subscribers for the Chinese magazine El Popola Ĉinio (The Chinese People); promoted the regular Esperanto conventions in East Berlin (beginning in 1960) and fought for the legalization of the Esperanto language in the GDR.

== Legacy ==
He died in Berlin at the age of 99. Maier’s testament established that his fortune should be donated to the Esperanto-Ligo Berlin and the Esperanto Movement in China. Resolving this legal situation took several years to the league.

The Berlin part of the inheritance was invested to build the Germana Esperanta Kultura Centro, new home of the Berlin Esperanto Movement.
