= Mondpaca Esperantista Movado =

Esperanto association founded in Austria

MEM sign from 1986

Mondpaca Esperantista Movado (MEM; World Peace Esperantist Movement) was an Esperanto association founded in 1953 in St. Pölten, Austria, by Rudolf Burda. Its aim was "utiligi Esperanton serve al paco kaj reciproka kompreno inter la popoloj" (to use Esperanto to serve peace and reciprocal understanding between peoples). Its official magazine was PACO.

From 1959 to 1963 its vice president was Eŭgeno Bokarev. In 1983, it began to collaborate with the World Esperanto Association (UEA).

During the Cold War, MEM was able to conduct official activities on behalf of Esperanto in East Bloc countries on the condition that it must support their Communist governments and the Soviet viewpoint.

== See also ==
- List of anti-war organizations
