= New Zealand Esperanto Association =

The New Zealand Esperanto Association (NZEA; Esperanto: Nov-Zelanda Esperanto-Asocio; Māori: Te Rōpū o Aotearoa mō te Reo o te Ao) is the national Esperanto association of New Zealand. It is an incorporated society and affiliated with the Universal Esperanto Association.

== History ==
NZEA was founded in Auckland on 1 February 1910. The first president of the Association was Mr George Aldridge of Auckland. Dr L. L. Zamenhof agreed to be the Honorary President. The then Prime Minister of New Zealand, Sir Joseph Ward and George Fowler M.P. became patrons of the Association.

During the First World War, the association ceased to exist. It was revived in 1928 under a new President Mr (later Professor) C. John Adcock.

As at 2009 the Association's president was David Ryan.

In 1983, the Inland Revenue Department granted NZEA the status of charitable organisation.

== Annual congress ==
The New Zealand Esperanto Association generally arranges an annual Esperanto congress. The congress is usually of 3 to 5 days duration and occurs usually in January or February. About every fourth year NZEA has a combined congress with the Australian Esperanto Association, either in New Zealand or Australia. In January 2008, Oceanea Congress took place in Auckland with many Esperantists from Australia and other countries. There were classes in the Esperanto language for beginners, learners and fluent speakers. There were also sessions about the language, entertainment and the annual meeting of the Association.

== Publications ==
The official journal of NZEA is called Esperanto sub la Suda Kruco. It is published jointly with the Australian Esperanto Association. NZEA publishes a member newsletter called Arĝenta Filiko, usually twice a year. It aims principally to inform members about congress arrangements.
