= Australian Esperanto Association =

The Australian Esperanto Association (AEA) is a national Esperanto association of Australia. It is affiliated with the Universal Esperanto Association.

== History ==
The Australian Esperanto Association was formed in October 1911, during the first Australian congress, attended by 53 Esperantists. In 1976 AEA hosted the first Pacific Congress of Esperanto, in Melbourne. This was attended by 190 people, 51 from overseas. In 1988 it hosted the 4th Pacific Congress in Brisbane, with 204 attending, 76 from overseas.

In 1997 the 82nd world congress of Esperanto was held in Adelaide. Approximately one thousand Esperantists from 54 countries came to the congress, 820 of them from overseas.

== Affiliations ==
AEA is affiliated with the Universal Esperanto Association (UEA), the International Esperantist Teachers League (ILEI) and with state and city Esperanto organisations, including the Esperanto Federation of New South Wales, Esperanto South Australia and Melbourne Esperanto Association.

AEA publishes in its website a list of local Esperanto clubs and organisations in Australia. Local Esperanto groups exist in Sydney, Melbourne, Adelaide, Brisbane, Hobart, Perth, Canberra, Toowoomba (Qld), Manly (NSW), Newcastle (NSW), Torquay (Vic), and Central Coast (NSW).

== Congress and summer school ==
AEA holds a national congress and summer school each year, usually in January, with lectures, workshops, artistic presentations, excursions and classes in the language for beginners and intermediate-level speakers. In March 2016, AEA and the Esperanto associations of Indonesia and New Zealand held a three-nation congress in Bandung, Indonesia, the site of the historic Asia-Africa Conference of 1955. The second three-nation congress was held in Bekasi, Indonesia, in March 2018.

== Journal ==
The official journal of the Australian Esperanto Association and the New Zealand Esperanto Association is “Esperanto sub la Suda Kruco” (Esperanto Beneath the Southern Cross) (ESK). ESK is available both in printed as well as electronic (pdf) format, and is sent out quarterly to every member of both associations.

== Internet TV ==
Esperanto-TV is a high-quality Internet Protocol Television (IPTV) service, based in Sydney, which broadcasts content worldwide exclusively in Esperanto. It can be viewed on computer, Android smartphone, iPhone, iPad and (in the US, Canada, UK and Ireland) on “traditional television” (via Roku Streaming Player). Esperanto-TV is supported by the Australian Esperanto Association.

== Radio and podcast ==
A program of news, interviews and songs in Esperanto is broadcast for one hour every Monday at 1pm by Melbourne ethnic community radio 3ZZZ, on 92.3 FM. Programs are also available as podcasts on the Melbourne Esperanto Association website.

== Official examinations ==
AEA administers an official examination system, intended to officially test and certify linguistic proficiency in Esperanto. The system is composed of 3 separate tests: Elementa (basic), Supera (intermediate) and Klereca (advanced). Successful completion of one of these tests is sometimes a pre-requisite to receiving scholarships, or entering specific courses.

The official examinations of AEA are made available to all during the annual Congress and Summer School, as well as throughout the year through specially appointed representatives in various local Esperanto organisations throughout the country. The entire examination system is overseen by the AEA Chief Examiner - currently Trevor Steele, a renowned Esperanto author, and member of the Academy of Esperanto.
