= Usona Esperantisto =

Bi-monthly publication of Esperanto-USA

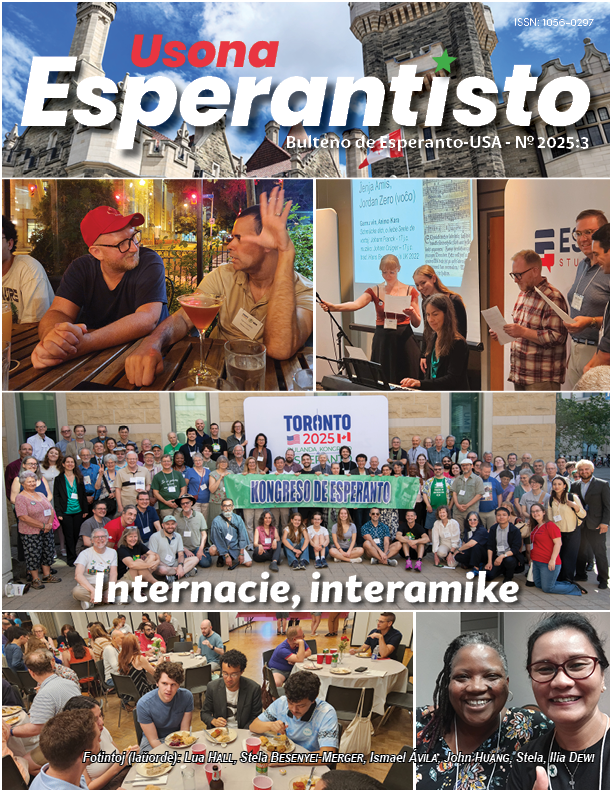
- Cover page of “Usona Esperantisto”, June–August 2025
- Editor: Alena Adler
- Editor: Lua Hall
- Categories: Esperanto, Language, Fiction, Culture, History
- Frequency: Quarterly
- Publisher: Esperanto-USA
- First issue: 1953
- Country: United States
- Language: Esperanto, English
- Website: https://bulteno.esperanto-usa.org
- ISSN: 1056-0297

Usona Esperantisto (English: American Esperantist) is the quarterly publication of Esperanto-USA, the organization for Esperanto speakers in the United States. Most of the content is in Esperanto, with the remainder in English. Topics include discussions of Esperanto culture, book reviews, short stories, and games.

First appearing in 1953, the magazine has changed names several times, from North American Esperanto Review to ELNA Newsletter to Esperanto USA. The name Usona Esperantisto was adopted in 2008. In 2012 the magazine became a web publication, but in 2024 print publication resumed. The website features both current articles as well as a growing archive of back-issues.

== See also ==
- Amerika Esperantisto
- List of Esperanto periodicals
