= Esperanto-USA =

Esperanto organization in the United States

- Founded: 1952
- Type: Educational
- Purpose: International language, communication
- Headquarters: Sacramento, CA
- Region served: United States
- President: Brandon Sowers
- Vice President: Quintyn Bobb
- Executive Director: Amanda Schmidt
- Website: Esperanto-USA.org

Esperanto-USA (E-USA) is the largest organization for speakers and supporters of Esperanto in the United States. It was founded in 1952 as the Esperanto League for North America (ELNA) at the famous "Senator Hotel" in Sacramento, California. Still headquartered in Sacramento today, Esperanto-USA is a 501(c)(3) nonprofit organization and the U.S. affiliate of the Universal Esperanto Association. Brandon Sowers is President of E-USA, and Quintyn Bobb is vice-president.

The organization administers the largest Esperanto-language book service in the Americas and publishes a quarterly bulletin Usona Esperantisto. It also administers the American Good Film Festival, a short-film contest open to amateur and professional film-makers around the world. In the first six film festivals, Esperanto-USA added more than 150 original Esperanto films to its Youtube channel.

The organization's leadership consists of a paid executive director and a volunteer board including president, vice-president, secretary, treasurer, and nine directors; it also has many commissioners responsible for Esperanto-USA's activity in various connections (e.g. audio-visual service; cooperation with libraries; relations with local Esperanto clubs; etc.). Special interest groups associated with the organization include ham radio, chess, and veganism/vegetarianism.

The youth section of E-USA is USEJ (Usona Esperantista Junularo).

== History ==
During the first half of the 20th century, the chief Esperanto organization for the U.S. was the Esperanto Association of North America. In the early 1950s, the early days of the Cold War, EANA's president, George Alan Connor, a fierce anti-Communist, had begun his own McCarthyist attacks against leaders of the Esperanto movement in Europe and Asia.

The Universal Esperanto Association (UEA) began debating whether to expel Connor, who also held a position in UEA's leadership, and also to break off relations with EANA, which was UEA's US national association. In protest against EANA, American Esperantists founded the Esperanto League for North America. Three years later, UEA recognized ELNA as its American section, and subsequently severed ties with EANA. By then, most EANA members had gone over to ELNA. EANA was quickly rendered insignificant, and had disappeared by the 1970s.

In 2007, the members of the organization voted to adopt the name Esperanto-USA as an alias, while retaining the formal, official name Esperanto League for North America (Esperanto-Ligo por Norda Ameriko in Esperanto). Among other reasons, the change was made because the organization's scope is limited to the U.S., despite the North America in its original title. E-USA still uses its original acronym, ELNA, but only occasionally.

E-USA has held an annual convention (called a "congress" in accordance with Esperanto movement usage) every year since 1953, usually in the United States but occasionally in Canada or Mexico (meeting jointly with the Canadian Esperanto Association or the Mexican Esperanto Federation, respectively). The 2010 conference of E-USA took place in Bethesda, Maryland. The 2011 conference was in Emeryville, California, the 2012 conference in Dallas, Texas, the 2015 conference in Detroit, Michigan, the 2016 conference in Miami, Florida, and the 2013, 2017, and 2023 conferences in Raleigh, North Carolina. The 2018 conference occurred in Seattle, Washington, and the 2019 conference took place in Boston, Massachusetts. The 2020 and 2021 conferences were held online due to the COVID-19 pandemic. The 2022 conference was held at the 107th World Esperanto Congress in Montreal. Notable speakers have included Humphrey Tonkin, Katalin Kovats, Duncan Charters and Bertilo Wennergren.
