= Esperanto League of Bosnia and Herzegovina =

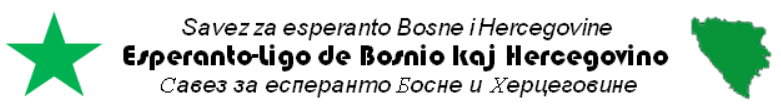
- Founded: 1910
- Type: Educational
- Purpose: International language, communication
- Location: Sarajevo
- Region served: Bosnia and Herzegovina
- Website: esperanto.ba; esperanto.rs.ba

The Esperanto League of Bosnia and Herzegovina (Esperanto: La Esperanto-Ligo de Bosnio kaj Hercegovino; Serbo-Croatian: Savez za esperanto Bosne i Hercegovine; Cyrillic: Савез за есперанто Босне и Херцеговине) is the national Esperanto association in Bosnia and Herzegovina, which represents Esperanto speakers, Esperanto societies, and friends. Since its establishment in 1910, it helps advancement of Esperanto language learning and usage in Bosnia and Herzegovina.

== History ==
Esperanto movement in Bosnia and Herzegovina has a long tradition, appearing in towns across the country as back as 1892 (then part of the Austro-Hungarian empire). Among the most important proponents of Esperanto in BiH was Nikola Niko Bubalo (1883–1924), born in small village of Ilići near Mostar, where he died in 1924. Under the pseudonym of Dragoš Slavić, Bubalo was the first in Bosnia and Herzegovina to publish Esperanto Key (grammar) in 1908 (press in Belgrade), in the "Trade and Craft Calendar" publication, and soon afterwards the first Esperanto travel guide in 1911. Soon, in 1910, the founding of the first organization ensued in Sarajevo, "La Stelo Bosnia" (English: "The Star Bosnia"), with 120 members 80 of which were from the city.

The movement was active even during the Second World War, and in 1943 a meeting was held in Livno, the only such Esperanto gathering in Nazi occupied Europe, among whose more famous attendees was Ivo Lola Ribar.

In 1949, the movement in Bosnia and Herzegovina was reorganized, and changed name into Esperanto League of Bosnia and Herzegovina. In 1997, the "Espero" charity was formed, and in 2000, the Esperanto Youth Alliance of Bosnia and Herzegovina was restored.

Two World Esperanto Congresses were held in Sarajevo, as well as numerous other meetings and events. In the 1980s, two scientific symposiums were held in Sarajevo, "Language and Racism" and "Language and International Communication". Sarajevo also hosted the Congress of Blind Esperantists in 1990.

After Bosnia's independence in 1992 and Bosnian War, a major crisis in the Esperanto movement ensued. In the same year, the Esperanto Federation of Bosnia and Herzegovina became independent and was admitted to the World Esperanto Association (UEA). During the war 1992-i996, a large number of members left the country, or lost their lives, while ties between different local organizations broke off. However, every week a radio show on Esperanto was broadcast on the Radio of Bosnia and Herzegovina, reporting about the war and other events in the country. The texts published in this show are compiled in the book "Spite al cio Bosnio". The Esperanto League was left without its premises and part of the archive was destroyed, but a number of titles were saved.

Before the Bosnian War in 1992, the Esperanto Society of Sarajevo had its numerous sections: the University Esperanto Club, the Railway Esperanto Society, the Esperanto Youth Association were very active in Sarajevo, with numerous sections and the Colombo school club, the most active in Yugoslavia, led by teacher and writer Smail Grbo.

According to the first address book of Esperanto language creator Lazar Ludovik Zamenhof, among the first Esperantoists in BiH were:

- 1892. Varcar Vakuf – Sinajko A. Torkar, Sinajko Oscar Pogačnig,
- 1895. Vlasenica – Dr. Adolf Gaudia,
- 1903. Srebrenica – Adolf Soumar, Bohumil Svasata, and Josef Studeny,
- 1905. Sarajevo – Koloman Koller, Leo Doler, Mery Payel, and Amalie Glouderer,
- 1905. Ljubuški – Josef Papo, Ignatz Mikišiček, Johan Janečka, Ilija Rastović, Dinko Uistura, and Vladimir Krpan,
- 1905. Visoko – Samuel Papo, a Frant Borovka-željezničar.

=== Banja Luka branch ===
In Banja Luka, according to archival sources, some activities were recorded as far back as 1924. After the Second World War, in 1953 the Esperanto Club "La Mondo" was founded in Banja Luka, with the first president prof. Dr. Miroslav Vrabec. However, the most productive periods in Banja Luka were from 1979 to 1990, and from 1995 to 2003. The first president of the Esperanto society "La Mondo" was Assist. Prof. Ljubiša Preradović, PhD., while the members of the first Executive Committee were:

1. Dr. Ljubiša Preradović – President
2. eng. Mico Vrhovac – Vice President
3. Vukasin Ćutić – Secretary
4. Prof. Mićo Stojanovic – Member
5. Biljana Gagula – Member

== Activities ==
The League until the collapse of the state of Yugoslavia operated under the organizational roof of the Yugoslav Esperanto Federation, and as an independent country association in 1992 joined the Universal Esperanto Association (UEA). The league has its own premises in the Sarajevo city center. The official magazine of the League is the publication "Bosnia Lilio" ("Bosnian Lily"). There are also the Association of Esperanto Youth of Bosnia and Herzegovina, whose work is restored in 2000.

It is estimated that currently in Bosnia and Herzegovina, there are around 100 (hundred) speakers of Esperanto. Two main associations that coordinate activities on teaching, learning and promoting language exist in Bosnia and Herzegovina, with regional "la mondo" organization in Banja Luka with 25 members, and national "Savez za esperanto Bosne i Hercegovine" in Sarajevo. In 2001, a seminar on International Solidarity was held in Sarajevo. A seminar of the World Esperanto Youth Association (TEJO), entitled "Rete Intercultures", was held in Sarajevo from 21 to 28 March 2004, with 40 participants from 17 countries (Bosnia and Herzegovina, Czech Republic, France, Netherlands, Croatia, Italy, Macedonia, Germany, Norway, Russia, United States, Slovakia, Slovenia, Serbia and Montenegro, Sweden, United Kingdom, Venezuela).

== Publishing, radio and TV ==
The magazine of the league, "Bosnia Lilio" (Serbo-Croatian: Bosanski Ljiljan; English: Bosnian Lilly), is conceived after the 1992, with first issue being published in Catalonia with a help of Catalan Esperanto organization in 1997. One of the first books published in former Yugoslavia on Esperanto potential usage, learning and teaching, "Esperanto u škole!" (English: Esperanto to schools!), is written on 400 pages by Smail Grbo, who also authored another 10 books on the subject, and who was one of the most active language promoters in Yugoslavia and later in Bosnia and Herzegovina.
Every week a radio show on Esperanto was broadcast on the Radio of Bosnia and Herzegovina, reporting about the war and other events in the country. The book "Spite al cio Bosnio" is published as a compilation of texts produced in this weekly radio show broadcast during the Bosnian War, between 1992 and 1996.
