= Detlev Blanke =

German interlinguistics lecturer

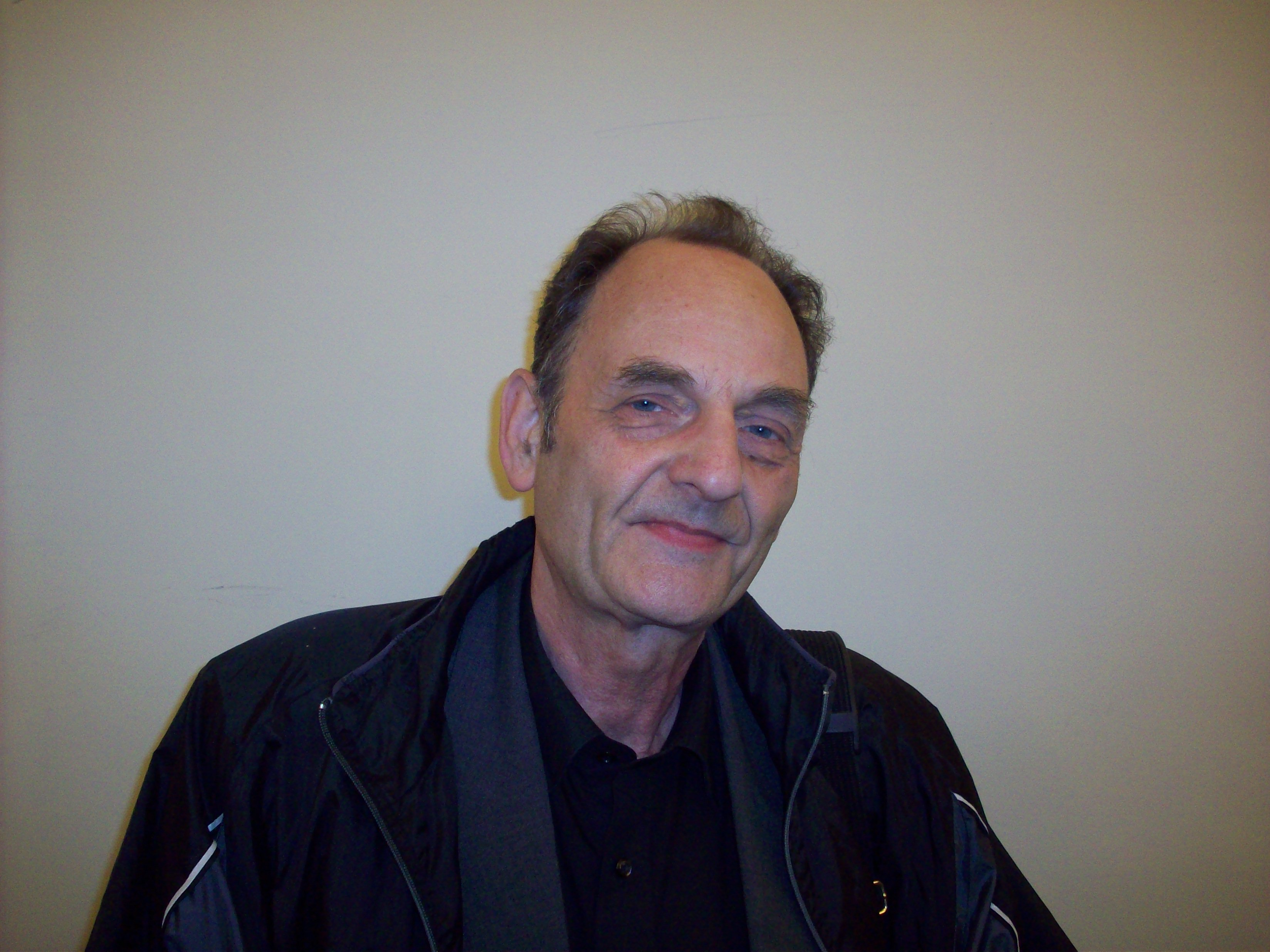
- Born: 30 May 1941; Neumünster, Germany
- Died: 20 August 2016 (aged 75)
- Known for: Philologist of Esperanto and German
- Spouse(s): Wera Blanke, married 1986

Detlev Blanke (30 May 1941 – 20 August 2016) was a German Esperantist. He was an interlinguistics lecturer at the Humboldt University of Berlin. He was one of Germany's most active Esperanto philologists and was from 1991 to 2016 both the chair of the Gesellschaft für Interlinguistik ("Interlinguistics Society") and the editor of its newsletter, Interlinguistische Informationen. He and his wife, Wera Blanke, were especially interested in the evolution of language, particularly in the development of terminology for the constructed language, Esperanto, and questions of sociolinguistics. Blanke made a study of Eugen Wüster's work toward common international terminology and international standardization.

== Academic career ==
After completing his initial university studies he worked as a teacher of German and geography. He earned a doctorate from Humboldt University of Berlin in 1976 with his dissertation on comparative word construction of Esperanto and German. In 1985 he earned a second doctorate from Humboldt on constructed languages. (In the former East Germany such a second degree was known as "dissertation B", corresponding to the highest academic qualification of "habilitation" awarded to full professors in many European countries.) In 1988 the university appointed him "Honorary Lecturer of Interlinguistics."

== Esperanto activities ==
Having first taught himself Esperanto in 1957, he later became secretary (1968 through 1990) of the Centra Laborrondo de Esperanto-Amikoj ("Central Working Circle of Friends of Esperanto"), a government-sanctioned affiliate of East Germany's Cultural Association (Deutsche Kulturbund). After 1981 the group became a part of the newly founded German Democratic Republic Esperanto Association (Esperanto-Asocio de GDR, GDREA). From 1970 to 1990 Prof. Blanke was also editor of the newsletter of those organizations, Der Esperantist. In 1991 the Esperantists of the former East Germany formally affiliated with the German Esperanto Association (Germana Esperanto-Asocio) which had previously operated only in West Germany.

== Works of Detlev Blanke ==
=== Original works in Esperanto ===
- Ĉu lingvopolitikon por Esperanto?
- La "Enciklopedia vortaro" de Eugen Wüster
- "Esperanto" aŭ "Internacia Lingvo (ILo)": kiel nomi la lingvon?
- Esperanto kaj lingvistiko: sciencpolitikaj aspektoj
- Esperanto kiel faklingvo: elekta bibliografio
- Eugen Wüster, la planlingvoj kaj la "naturalisma skolo"
- La gazeto "Völkerspiegel"
- Kelkaj problemoj de la vortfarado de la germana lingvo kaj de Esperanto: Motivado de la signifo de Esperantaj vortoj
- Konfronta komparo de Esperanto kaj la germana lingvo
- Konfronta lingvistika komparo de etnolingvo kaj planlingvo
- Lingvoplanado en planlingvo: La esperantologio, ĉu priskriba aŭ preskriba scienco?
- La lingvoscienco kaj planlingvoj: Interlingvistiko kaj interlingvistikaj esploroj
- La malnovaj lingvoj kaj la problemo de internacia monda helplingvo
- Notoj (interview with the French linguist André Martinet)
- Pazigrafioj: La Esperanto-movado kaj sciencaj esploroj
- Planlingvaj projektoj kaj la planlingvo Esperanto: La antikvaj lingvoj kaj la problemo de internacia lingvo
- Pri Esperanto kaj interlingvistikaj aranĝoj en germanaj universitatoj: kaj pri kelkaj lastatempaj spertoj el Humboldt-Universitato
- Pri kio verkas esperantologoj kaj kie trovi iliajn publikaĵojn?
- Pri la aktuala stato de interlingvistiko: kelkaj teoriaj kaj scienc-organizaj problemoj
- Pri la "interna ideo" de Esperanto
- Pri la leksikografio de kelkaj planlingvoj: tipologia kaj bibliografia skizo
- Pri la stato de la internacia aplikado de Esperanto: Jubilea kongreso en Kopenhago
- Pri la termino planlingvo
- Pri la verbkonstruo en la germana lingvo kaj en Esperanto: kompara skizo
- Resumo kaj rezultoj de disertacio
- La rolo de la planlingvoj ĉe la evoluo de terminologi-sciencaj konceptoj de Eugen Wüster: omaĝe al la centa datreveno de la naskiĝo de Eugen Wüster

=== Translation into Esperanto ===
- Karl Marx: Manifesto de la Komunista Partio

=== Original works in German ===
- Der Anteil der Arbeiter-Esperantisten bei der Entwicklung der deutsch-sowjetischen Freundschaft in der Zeit der Weimarer Republik
- Einige methodologische Probleme der Geschichtsschreibung über GDREA
- Esperanto als Sprache und Unterrichtsgegenstand
- Esperanto in soziolinguistischer Sicht
- Esperanto und Wissenschaft. Zur Plansprachenproblematik Berlin: Kulturbund der DDR, 1982, 88 pp. (2nd expanded ed.. 1986)
- Eugen Wüster und sein "Enzyklopädisches Wörterbuch Esperanto-Deutsch"
- Fachkommunikation in Plansprachen
- Das Glottonym 'Esperanto' als Metapher
- Grundfragen der Entwicklung von Plansprachen - unter besonderer Berücksichtigung des Esperanto
- Interlinguistik in der DDR: eine Bilanz
- Interlinguistik und Plansprachen
- Internationale Kommunikation: die Möglichkeiten von Welthilfssprachen
- "Internationale Plansprachen. Eine Einführung" in Sammlung Akademie-Verlag, issue 34. Berlin, 1985, 408 pp., ISSN 0138-550X
- Interlinguistische Beiträge. Zum Wesen und zur Funktion internationaler Plansprachen. Sabine Fiedler, ed. Frankfurt: Peter Lang Verlag, 2006, 405 pp., ISBN 3-631-55024-3
- (with Till Dahlenburg): Konversationsbuch Deutsch-Esperanto. Leipzig: Enzyklopädie-Verlag, 1990, 210 pp. ISBN 3-324-00508-6, (2nd expanded ed., 1998, Vienna)
- Leibniz und die Lingua Universalis
- Pasigraphien (Weltschriften): eine Skizze
- "Plansprache und Nationalsprache. Einige Probleme der Wortbildung des Esperanto und des Deutschen in konfrontativer Darstellung" in Linguistische Studien, Series A, No. 85, Berlin: GDR Academy of Sciences, 1981, 162 pp. (2nd ed., 1982)
- Plansprachen als Fachsprachen
- Plansprachen und europäische Sprachenpolitik
- Plansprachige Wörterbücher

=== Translations into English ===
- International Planned Languages
