= Outline of Esperanto =

Constructed language

The following outline is provided as an overview of and topical guide to Esperanto:

The flag of Esperanto

Esperanto is the most widely spoken constructed international auxiliary language. L. L. Zamenhof, a Polish-Jewish ophthalmologist, created Esperanto in the late 19th century and published the first book detailing it, Unua Libro, in 1887 under the pseudonym Dr. Esperanto, Esperanto translating as "one who hopes".

== Description ==
Esperanto can be described as all of the following:

- Language
  - Constructed language
    - International auxiliary language

== Branches of Esperanto ==
- Esperantido
  - Reformed Esperanto (Esperanto 1894)
    - Ido
      - Esperanto II
    - Romániço

== History of Esperanto ==
- History of Esperanto
  - Zamenhof
    - Proto-Esperanto
    - Unua Libro
    - Dua Libro
    - La Esperantisto
    - Fundamento de Esperanto
  - Declaration of Boulogne
  - Montevideo Resolution
  - Manifesto of Rauma
  - Manifesto of Prague
  - Modern evolution of Esperanto

== General Esperanto concepts ==
- Grammar
- Phonology
- Orthography
  - Braille
  - Substitutions and reforms of the Esperanto alphabet
  - Letters with diacritics
    - Ĉ
    - Ĝ
    - Ĥ
    - Ĵ
    - Ŝ
    - Ŭ
- Vocabulary
- Etymology
- Special Esperanto adverbs
- Interrogatives in Esperanto
- Esperanto words with the infix -um-
- Esperanto profanity
- Comparison between:
  - Esperanto and Ido
  - Esperanto and Novial
- Gender reform in Esperanto

== Esperanto organizations ==
- List of Esperanto organizations
  - World Esperanto Congress
  - Akademio de Esperanto
  - Universal Esperanto Association
  - World Esperanto Youth Organization
  - International Youth Congress
  - European Youth Week
  - World Anational Association
  - Encyclopedia
  - Pasporta Servo
  - Plouézec Meetings
  - Europe–Democracy–Esperanto
  - Panamerican Congress
  - Skolta Esperanto Ligo

=== Presidents of Universal Esperanto Association ===
- Universal Esperanto Association
- President of the Universal Esperanto Association
  - Louis Bastien (Esperantist)
  - Probal Dasgupta
  - Kep Enderby
  - Mark Fettes
  - Hector Hodler
  - Harry W. Holmes
  - Ivo Lapenna
  - Ernfrid Malmgren
  - Harold Bolingbroke Mudie
  - Edmond Privat
  - John C. Wells

=== Additional Esperanto organizations ===
- Esperanto club
- International League of Esperantist Radio Amateurs
- Akademio de Esperanto
- Akademio Literatura de Esperanto
- Arbeidernes Esperantoforbund
- Association of Green Esperantists
- Bahá'í Esperanto-League
- Buenos Aires Esperanto Association
- Distributed Language Translation
- Esperantic Studies Foundation
- Esperanto Museum and Collection of Planned Languages
- Europe–Democracy–Esperanto
- European Esperanto Union
- Icelandic Esperanto Association
- Indigenous Dialogues
- Indonesian Esperanto Association
- International Esperanto League
- International League of Christian Esperantists
- International League of Esperanto Teachers
- International Union of Catholic Esperantists
- Iranian Esperanto Association
- Junularo Esperantista Brita
- Mondpaca Esperantista Movado
- Pasporta Servo
- Plouézec International Meetings
- President of the Universal Esperanto Association
- Quebec Esperanto Society
- SATEB
- Sennacieca Asocio Tutmonda
- Skolta Esperanto Ligo
- Terminologia Esperanto-Centro
- Universal Esperanto Association
- World Esperantist Vegetarian Association
- World Esperanto Youth Organization

=== National Esperanto organizations ===
- Australian Esperanto Association
- Esperanto Association of Britain
- Canadian Esperanto Association
- Croatian Esperanto League
- Esperanto in Malaysia
- Iranian Esperanto Association
- New Zealand Esperanto Association
- Norvega Esperantista Ligo
- Taiwan Esperanto Association
- Esperanto-USA
- Esperanto in Korea
- Esperanto in China
- Esperanto in Japan

=== Esperanto meetings ===
- Conference on the Application of Esperanto in Science and Technology
- Esperanto Youth Week
- FESTO (Esperanto meeting)
- Internacia Junulara Festivalo
- Internaciaj Floraj Ludoj
- International Youth Congress
- Panamerican Esperanto Congress
- Summer Esperanto Study
- World Esperanto Congress

== Esperanto ideas ==
- Anationalism
- Finvenkismo
- Raumism

== Esperanto publications ==
=== Dictionaries ===
- Komputeko
- Pekoteko
- Plena Ilustrita Vortaro de Esperanto
- Plena Manlibro de Esperanta Gramatiko
- Plena Vortaro de Esperanto
- Reta Vortaro
- La Vortaro
- Vortaro de Esperanto

=== Encyclopedias ===
- Encyclopedias in Esperanto
  - Enciklopedio Kalblanda
  - Esperanto Wikipedia

=== Esperanto literature ===
- Esperanto literature
  - Akademio Literatura de Esperanto
  - Dua Libro
  - Floral Games
  - Fundamento de Esperanto
  - Ho, mia kor'
  - The Life of Zamenhof
  - Proverbaro Esperanta
  - Saga (comics)
  - Serio Oriento-Okcidento
  - The Epic of Utnoa
  - Two Diseases in Esperanto
  - Unua Libro
  - L. L. Zamenhof
  - Lidia Zamenhof

==== Esperanto novels ====
- Abismoj
- Children of Orpheus
- Gerda malaperis!
- Kazohinia
- Kredu min, sinjorino!
- Metro (novel)
- Mr. Tot Aĉetas Mil Okulojn
- Saltego trans Jarmiloj
- Tur-Strato 4
- Voyage to Faremido

=== Esperanto media ===
- Esperanto music
  - La Espero
- List of Esperanto-language films

=== Esperanto magazines ===
- List of Esperanto periodicals
  - Amerika Esperantisto
  - Esperanto (magazine)
  - Heroldo de Esperanto
  - Irana Esperantisto
  - Kontakto
  - La Esperantisto
  - La Revuo
  - Libera Folio
  - Lingvo Internacia (periodical)
  - Literatura Foiro
  - Literatura Mondo
  - Monato
  - La Ondo de Esperanto
  - PACO (magazine)

=== Historical publications ===
- Bible translations into Esperanto
- Der Esperantist
- La Esperantisto
- Lingvo Internacia (periodical)
- Plena Ilustrita Vortaro de Esperanto
- Xin Shiji

== Persons influential in Esperanto ==
- Esperanto movement
  - List of Esperanto speakers
    - Esperantujo
      - Native Esperanto speakers

== Esperanto education ==
- International Academy of Sciences San Marino
- Bona Espero
- International League of Esperanto Teachers
- Lernu!
- North American Summer Esperanto Institute
- Propaedeutic value of Esperanto
- Summer Esperanto Study
- Wedgwood Memorial College
- Château de Grésillon
