= Esperantujo =

Esperantujo Esperantio
- Linguistic area
- Flag Symbol
- Etymology: Esperant + ujo (“nation of Esperanto”)
- Anthem: "La Espero"
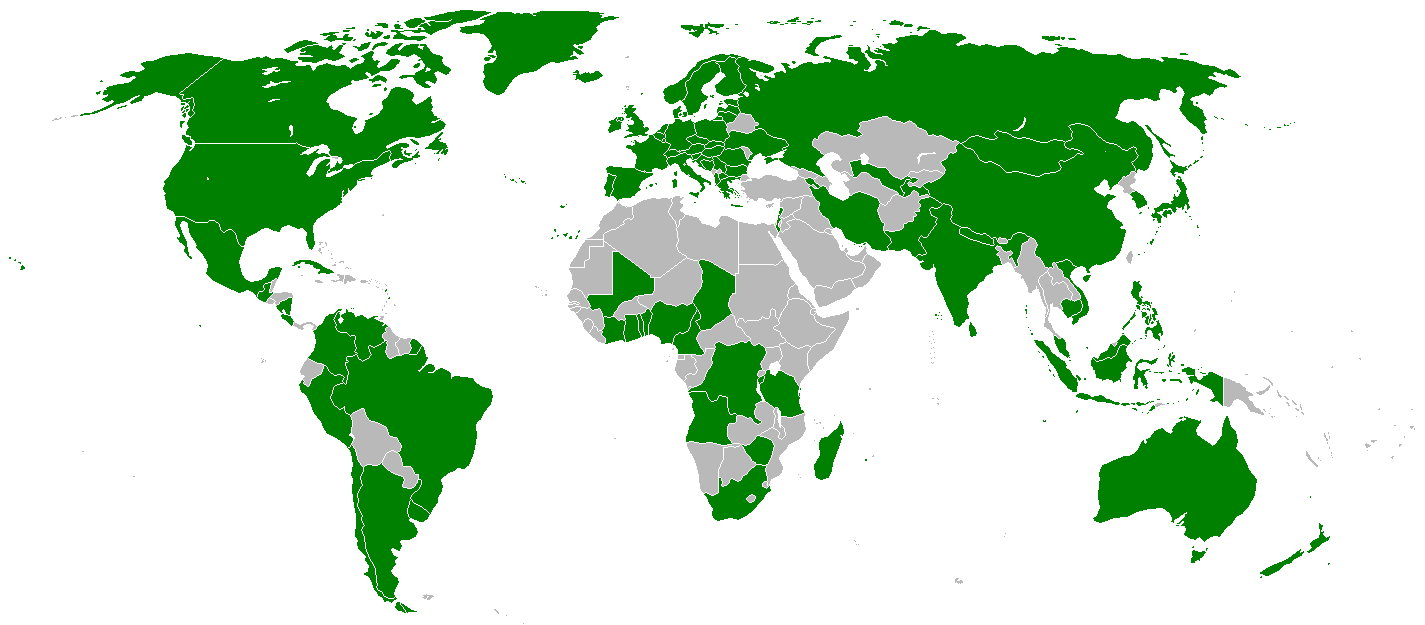
- Countries where a national Esperanto Association exists

Population
  - Estimate (1999): 2 million
- Demonym: Esperantist
- Language: Esperanto

Esperantujo (IPA: [esperanˈtujo]) or Esperantio (IPA: [esperanˈtio]) is the community of speakers of the Esperanto language and their culture, as well as the places and institutions where the language is used. The term is used "as if it were a country."

Although it does not occupy its own area of Earth's surface, it can be said to constitute the 120 countries which have their own national Esperanto association.

== Etymology and terminology ==
The word is formed analogously to country names. In Esperanto, the names of countries were traditionally formed from the ethnic name of their inhabitants plus the suffix -ujo. For example, "France" was Francujo, from franco (a Frenchman).

The term analogous to Francujo would be Esperantistujo (Esperantist-nation). However, that would convey the idea of a physical body of people, whereas using the name of the language as the basis of the word gives it the more abstract connotation of a cultural sphere.

Currently, names of nation states are often formed with the suffix -io (traditionally reserved for deriving country names from geographic features — e.g. Francio instead of Francujo), and recently the form Esperantio has been used, among others, in the Pasporta Servo and the Esperanto Citizens' Community.

== History ==
In 1908, Dr. Wilhelm Molly attempted to create an Esperanto state in the Prussian-Belgian condominium of Neutral Moresnet, known as "Amikejo" (place of friendship). What became of it is unclear, and Neutral Moresnet was annexed to Belgium in the Treaty of Versailles, 1919.

During the 1960s came a new effort of creating an Esperanto state, which this time was called the Republic of Rose Island. The state island stood in the Adriatic Sea near Italy.

In Europe, on 2 June 2001, a number of organizations (they prefer to call themselves establishments) founded the Esperanta Civito, which "aims to be a subject of international law" and "aims to consolidate the relations between the Esperantists who feel themselves belonging to the diaspora language group which does not belong to any country". Esperanto Civito always uses the name Esperantujo (introduced by Hector Hodler in 1908), which itself is defined according to their interpretation of raumism, and the meaning, therefore, may differ from the traditional Esperanto understanding of the word Esperantujo.

A language learning partner application called Amikumu was launched in 2017, allowing Esperanto speakers to find each other.

== Geography ==
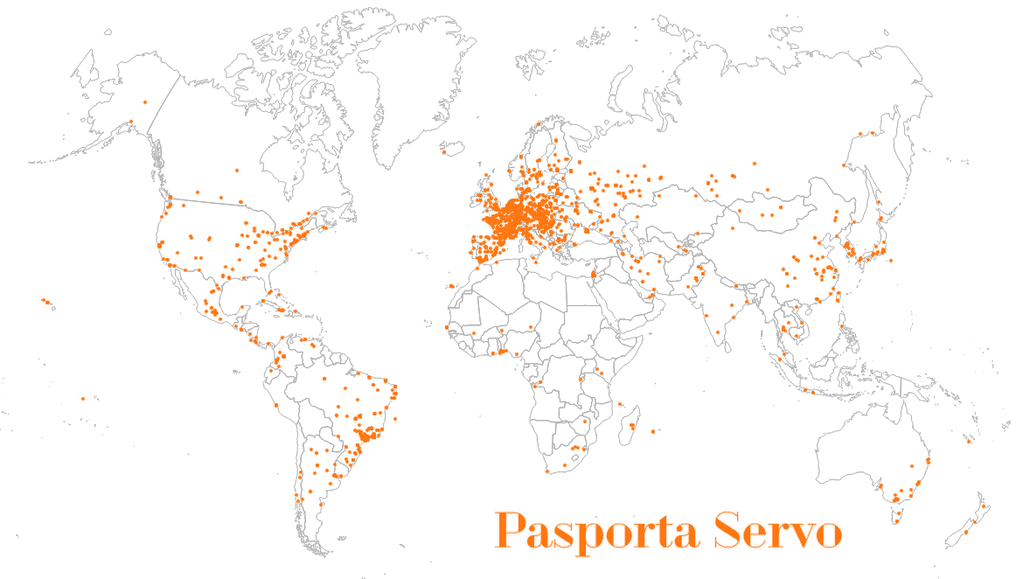
Cities in the world with Pasporta Servo hosts

Esperantujo includes any physical place where Esperanto speakers meet, such as Esperanto gatherings or virtual networks. Sometimes it is said that it is everywhere where Esperanto speakers are connected.

Although Esperantujo does not have its own official territory, a number of places around the world are owned by Esperanto organizations or are otherwise permanently connected to the Esperanto language and its community:

- Białystok, the birthplace of L. L. Zamenhof (the creator of Esperanto), and very much the place which inspired him to create an international auxiliary language and facilitate communication across language barriers.
- The German city Herzberg am Harz is home to the Interkultura Centro Herzberg, and, since 12 July 2006, advertises itself as "Esperanto city" (Esperanto: Esperanto-urbo, German: Esperanto-Stadt). There are bilingual signs and pointers, in both German and Esperanto.
- The Château de Grésillon (Esperanto: Kastelo Greziljono) in France is owned by the non-profit organization "Cultural House of Esperanto" (Kulturdomo de Esperanto), which hosts various Esperanto events in the summer and during French school holidays.
- The Esperanto Museum and Collection of Planned Languages, a department of the Austrian National Library, is a museum for Esperanto and other constructed languages, located in Vienna.
- Zamenhof-Esperanto objects can be found all over the world. These are places and objects — such as streets, memorials, public spaces, buildings, vehicles, or even geographic features — that are named after, or otherwise linked to the language, its creator L. L. Zamenhof, or its community of speakers.

The countries with the most members of the World Esperanto Association are (in descending order): Brazil, Germany, Japan, France, the United States, China, Italy.

== Politics ==
=== Associations ===
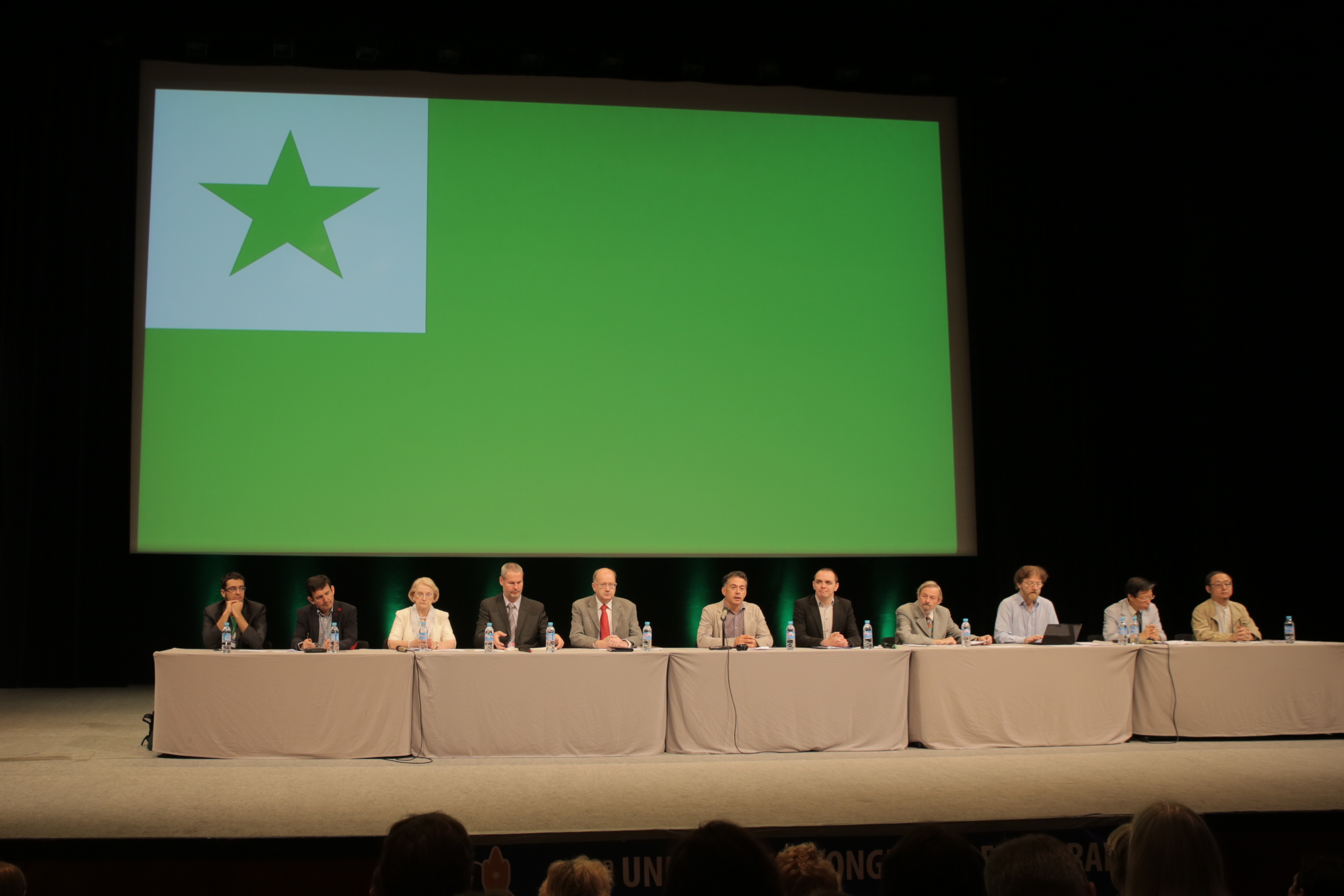
Leaders of the Universal Esperanto Association during 100th World Esperanto Congress in Lille, France, in 2015.

There is no governmental system in Esperantujo because it is not a true state. However, there is a social hierarchy of associations:

- Universal Esperanto Association (UEA) is the principal association created in 1908, its central office is located in Rotterdam. The aim of the UEA is to promote the use of Esperanto, to strive for the solution of the language problem in international relations, to encourage all types of spiritual and material relations among people and to nurture among its members a strong sense of solidarity, and to develop in them understanding and respect for other peoples.
- Sometimes there are associations by continent, for example, the European Esperanto Union. On the same level there are UEA commissions dedicated to promoting the spread of Esperanto in Africa, America (North & South), Asia, the Middle East, and Oceania.
- In at least 120 countries in the world there are national associations: Brazilian Esperanto League, the German Esperanto Association, Japanese Esperanto Association, Esperanto-USA and Australian Esperanto Association are examples from all continents across the world. The goals are usually to help teach the language and use of Esperanto in the country.
- Finally, there are local associations or Esperanto clubs where volunteers or activists offer courses to learn the language or get to know more about the culture of Esperanto. Sometimes they teach Esperanto in universities or schools.

Also there are thematic associations worldwide, which are concerned with spirituality, hobbies, science or bringing together Esperantists who share common interests.

There is also a number of global organizations, such as Sennacieca Asocio Tutmonda (SAT), or the World Esperanto Youth Organization (TEJO), which has 46 national sections.

=== Foreign relations ===
Universal Esperanto Association is not a governmental system; however, the association represents Esperanto worldwide. In addition to the United Nations and UNESCO, the UEA has consultative relationships with UNICEF and the Council of Europe and general cooperative relations with the Organization of American States. UEA officially collaborates with the International Organization for Standardization (ISO) by means of an active connection to the ISO Committee on terminology (ISO/TC 37). The association is active for information on the European Union and other interstate and international organizations and conferences. UEA is a member of European Language Council, a joint forum of universities and linguistic associations to promote the knowledge of languages and cultures within and outside the European Union. Moreover, on 10 May 2011, the UEA and the International Information Centre for Terminology (Infoterm) signed an Agreement on Cooperation, its objectives are inter exchange information, support each other and help out for projects, meetings, publications in the field of terminology and by which the UEA become Associate Member of Infoterm.

=== Political movement ===
In 2003 there was a European political movement called Europe–Democracy–Esperanto created. Within it is found a European federation that brings together local associations whose statutes depends on the countries. The working language of the movement is Esperanto. The goal is "to provide the European Union with the necessary tools to set up member rights democracy". The international language is a tool to enable cross-border political and social dialogue and actively contribute to peace and understanding between peoples. The original idea in the first ballot was mainly to spread the existence and the use of Esperanto to the general public. However, in France voices have grown steadily: 25067 (2004) 28944 (2009) and 33115 (2014). In this country there are a number of movements which support the issue: France Équité, Europe-Liberté, and Politicat.

=== Symbols ===
Flag of Esperanto

The flag of Esperanto is called Verda Flago (Green Flag). It consists of:

- a rectangular shape, officially with a 2:3 ratio.
- a green field, where the green color symbolizes hope. There is no indication that any "official" color was ever chosen. The shade used varies in different sources, yet the color 009900 is most often used.
- a white, square canton (upper hoist quarter), measuring exactly half the hoist, where the white color symbolizes peace and neutrality.
- in the canton, a green five-pointed star known as Verda Stelo (Green Star), which symbolizes the five continents.

The anthem is called La Espero since 1891: it is a poem written by L. L. Zamenhof. The song is usually sung to the triumphal march composed by Félicien Menu de Ménil in 1909.

The Jubilee symbol represents the language internally, while the flag represents the Esperanto movement. It contains the Latin letter E (Esperanto) and the Cyrillic letter Э (Эсперанто) symbolizing the unification of West and East. The Jubilee symbol has been controversial, with some Esperantists derisively calling it "the melon."

In addition, Ludwik Lejzer Zamenhof, the initiator of the language, is often used as a symbol. Sometimes he is even called "Uncle Zam", referring to the cartoon incarnation of American Uncle Sam.

== Population ==
=== Education ===
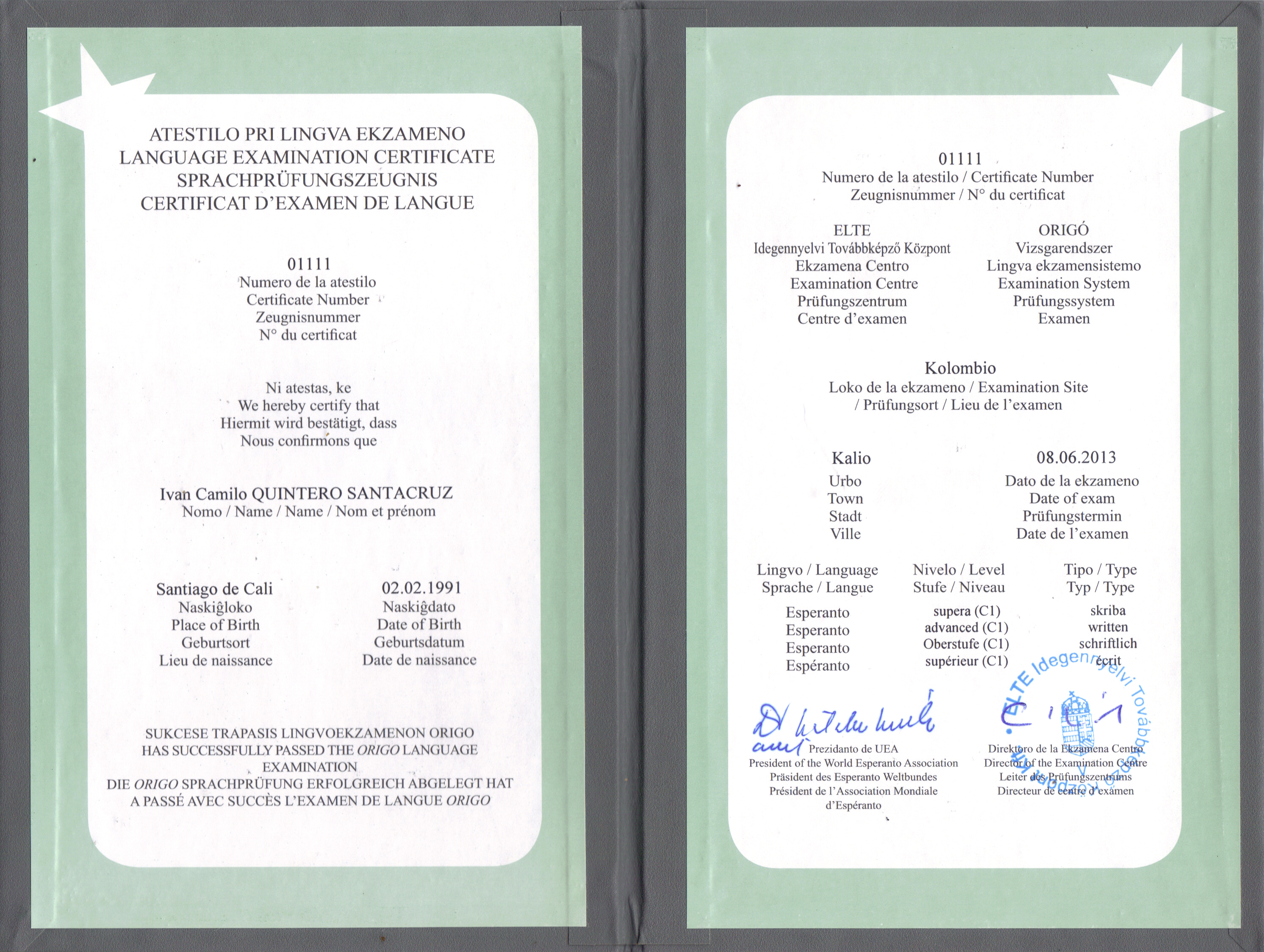
Certificate of KER-exam

In addition to textbooks, including the Fundamento de Esperanto by Zamenhof, the Assimil-methods and the video-methods such as Muzzy in Gondoland of the BBC and Pasporto al la tuta mondo, there are many courses for learning online. Moreover, some universities teach Esperanto, and the Higher Foreign Language training (University Eötvös Loránd) delivers certificates in accordance with the Common European Framework of Reference for Languages (CEFR). More than 1600 people have such a certificate around the world: in 2014 around 470 at the level of B1, 510 at the level of B2 and 700 for C1. The International League of Esperanto Teachers (ILEI) is also working to publish learning materials for teachers.

The University of Esperanto offers video lectures in Esperanto, for specialties like Confronting War, Informational Technologies and Astronomy. Courses are also held during the World Esperanto Congress in the framework of the Internacia Kongresa Universitato (IKU). After that, UEA uploads the related documents on its website.

Science is an appropriate department for works in Esperanto. For example, the Conference on the Application of Esperanto in Science and Technology (KAEST) occurs in November every year since 1998 in the Czech Republic and Slovakia. Personal initiatives are also common: Doctor of mathematics Ulrich Matthias created a document about the foundations of Linear Algebra and the American group of Maine (USA) wrote a guidebook to learn the programming language Python.

In general, Esperanto is used as a lingua franca in some websites aiming teaching of other languages, such as German, Slovak, Swahili, Wolof or Toki Pona.

=== Media ===
Since 1889 when La Esperantisto appeared, and soon other magazines in Esperanto throughout many countries in the world. Some of them are information media of Esperanto associations (Esperanto, Sennaciulo and Kontakto). Online Esperanto magazines like Libera Folio, launched in 2003, offer independent view of the Esperanto movement, aiming to soberly and critically shed light on current development. Most of the magazines deal with current events; one of such magazines is Monato, which is read in more than 60 countries. Its articles are written by correspondents from 40 countries, which know the local situation very well. Other most popular Esperanto newspapers are La Ondo de Esperanto, Beletra Almanako, Literatura Foiro, and Heroldo de Esperanto. Often national associations magazines are also published in order to inform about the movement in the country, such as Le Monde de l'espéranto of Espéranto-France. There are also scientific journals, such as Scienca Revuo of Internacia Scienca Asocio Esperantista (ISAE).

Muzaiko is a radio that has broadcast an all-day international program of songs, interviews and current events in Esperanto since 2011. The latest two can be downloaded as podcasts. Besides Muzaiko, these other stations offer an hour of Esperanto-language broadcasting of various topics: Radio Libertaire, Polskie Radio, Vatican Radio, Varsovia Vento, Radio Verda and Kern.punkto.

=== Internet ===
Spread of the Internet has enabled more efficient communication among Esperanto speakers and slightly replaced slower media such as mail. Many massively used websites such as Facebook or Google offer Esperanto interface. On 15 December 2009, on the occasion of the jubilee of 150th birthday of L. L. Zamenhof, Google additionally made visible the Esperanto flag as a part of their Google Doodles. Media as Twitter, Telegram, Reddit or Ipernity also contain a significant number of people in this community. In addition, content-providers such as WordPress and YouTube also enable bloggers write in Esperanto. Esperanto versions of programs such as the office suite LibreOffice and Mozilla Firefox browser, or the educational program about programming Scratch are also available. Additionally, games like Minecraft offer complete Esperanto interface.

Monero, an anonymous cryptocurrency, was named after the Esperanto word for "coin" and its official wallet is available in Esperanto. The same applies to Monerujo ("Monero container").

=== Sport ===
Although Esperantujo is not a country, there is an Esperanto football team, which has existed since 2014 and participates in matches during World Esperanto Congresses. The team is part of the N.F.-Board and not of FIFA, and have played against the teams of Armenian-originating Argentine Community in 2014 and the team from Western Sahara in 2015.

=== Esperanto speakers and Esperantists ===
Initially, Esperanto speakers learned the language as it was described by L. L. Zamenhof. In 1905, the Fundamento de Esperanto put together the first Esperanto textbook, an exercise book and a universal dictionary.

The "Declaration about the essence of Esperantism" (1905) defines an "Esperantist" to be anyone who speaks and uses Esperanto. "Esperantism" was defined to be a movement to promote the widespread use of Esperanto as a supplement to mother tongues in international and inter-ethnic contexts. As the word "esperantist" is linked with this "esperantism" (the Esperanto movement) and as -ists and -isms are linked with ideologies, today many people who speak Esperanto prefer to be called "Esperanto speaker".

The monthly magazine La Ondo de Esperanto every year since 1998 proclaims an 'Esperantist of the year', who remarkably contributed to the spreading of the language during the year.

== Economy ==
=== Businesses ===
Publishing and selling books, the so-called book services, is the main market and is often the first expenditure of many Esperanto associations. Some companies are already well known: for example Vinilkosmo, which publishes and makes popular Esperanto music since 1990. Then there are initiatives such as the job-seeking website Eklaboru, created by Chuck Smith, for job offers and candidates within Esperanto associations or Esperanto meetings.

=== Currency ===
In 1907, René de Saussure proposed the spesmilo ⟨₷⟩ as an international currency. It had some use before the First World War.

In 1942 a currency called the stelo ("star"; plural, steloj) was created. It was used at meetings of the Universala Ligo and in Esperanto environments such as the annual Universal Congress. Over the years it slowly became unusable and at the official closing of the Universala Ligo in the 1990s, the remaining steloj coins were handed over to the UEA. They can be bought at the UEA's book service as souvenirs.

The current steloj are made of plastic; they are used in a number of meetings, especially among young people. The currency is maintained by Stelaro, which calculates the rates, keeps the stock, and opened branches in various e-meetings. Currently, there are stelo-coins of 1 ★, 3 ★ and 10 ★. The exchange rate at 31 December 2014 was 1 EUR = 4.189 ★.

== Culture ==
=== Architectural heritage ===
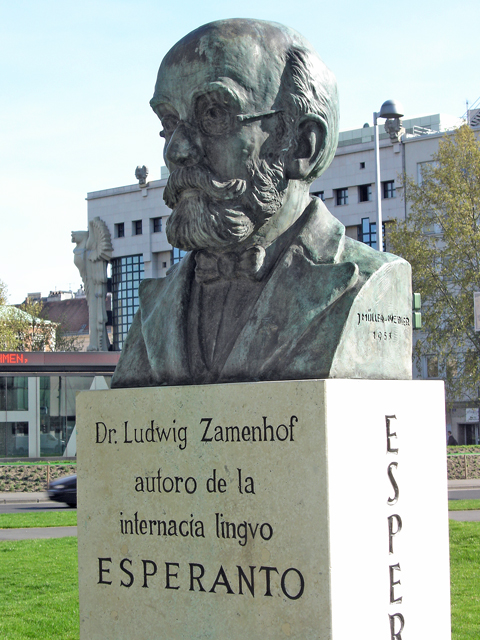
L. L. Zamenhof bust in the Esperantopark in Vienna

There exist Zamenhof-Esperanto objects (ZEOs), scattered in numerous countries around the world, which are the things named in honor of L. L. Zamenhof or Esperanto: monuments, street names, places and so on. There also exists a UEA-committee for ZEOs.

In addition, in several countries there are also sites dedicated to Esperanto: meetup places, workshops, seminars, festivals, Esperanto houses. These places provide attractions for Esperantists. Here are two: the Castle of Grésilion in France and the Department of Planned Languages and Esperanto Museum in Vienna (Austria).

=== Cultural heritage ===
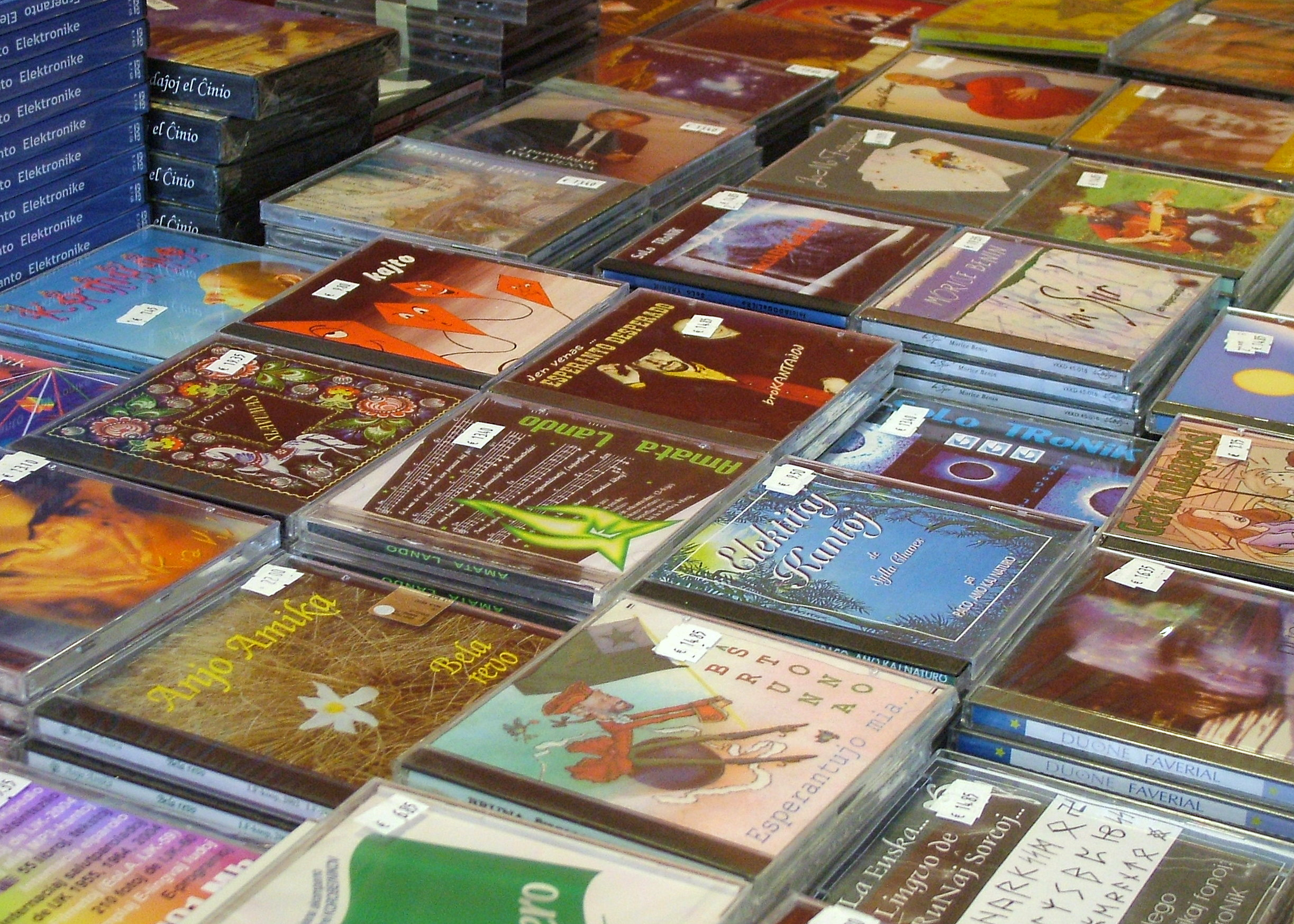
Music in Esperanto

Esperanto literary heritage is the richest and the most diverse of any constructed language. There are over 25,000 Esperanto books (originals and translations) as well as over a hundred regularly distributed Esperanto magazines.

There are also a number of movies which have been published in Esperanto. Moreover, Esperanto itself was used in numerous movies.

=== Celebrations ===
Many public holidays recognized by Esperanto speakers are celebrated internationally, having gained full acceptance by organizations such as UN and UNESCO, and are also publicly observed in select countries that are UN members. This is largely a byproduct of the influence the Esperanto community once had on organizations that worked in the field of international relations (including the United Nations) in the mid-20th century. Here are the celebrations proposed as international holidays by the UEA since 2010:

Date	Name	Meaning, purpose, anniversary
February 21	International Mother Language Day	Saving cultural diversity and multilingualism
last full week of February	Week of International Friendship	Strengthening mutual contacts and sense.
April 14	Memorial Day of all Pioneers	Anniversary of the death of L. L. Zamenhof (1917).
July 26	Esperanto Day	Anniversary of the appearance of Unua Libro (1887).
September 21	International Day of Peace (UN)	Not to fight, to stop wars and bring peace
September 26	European Day of Languages (Council of Europe)	Inspire the learning of languages across Europe.
December 15	Zamenhof Day	Birthday of L. L. Zamenhof (1859). Usual trade of Esperanto-books.

=== Cultural events ===
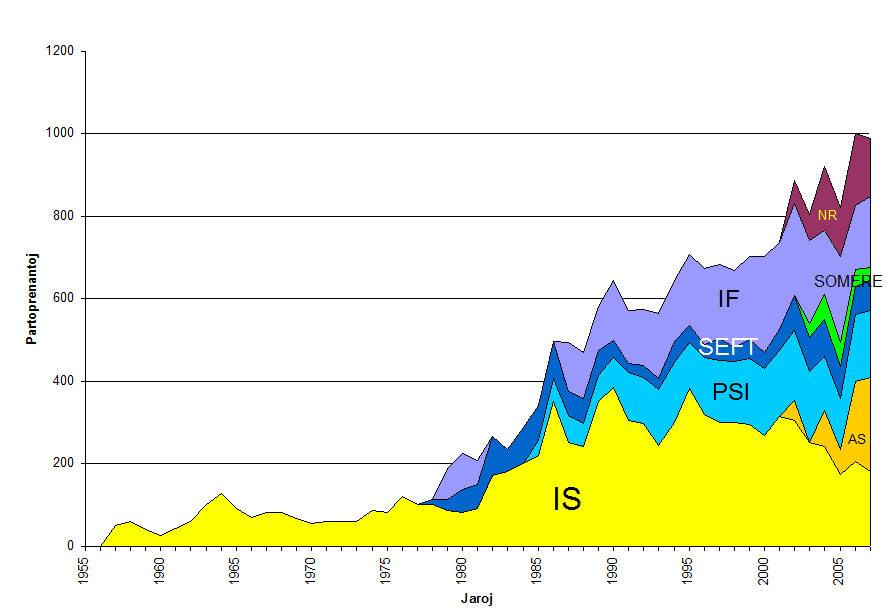
Number of participants of Esperanto-meeting in Central Europe

Every year numerous meetings of Esperanto speakers in different topics around the world take place. They mobilize Esperanto-speakers which share the same will about a specific topic. The main example is the Universal Congress of Esperanto (UK), a week-long summer conference organized annually by the UEA. Other events:

- SAT-Kongreso, annually organized by Sennacieca Asocio Tutmonda;
- International Youth Congress of Esperanto (IJK), official annual congress of TEJO;
- Internacia Infana Kongreseto (IIK), arrangement for children between 6 and 16 years that occur simultaneously with and close to the Universal Congress of Esperanto;
- Somera Esperanto-Studado (SES), the largest international Esperanto meeting aimed at learning of Esperanto.

Next to these globally comprising meetings there are also local events such as New Year's Gathering (NR) or Esperanto Youth Week (JES), which occur during the last days of December and first days of January. These meetings seem to have been successful during the last 20 years.

Due to the fact that there are a lot of Esperanto meetings around the globe, there are websites which aim to list and share them. Eventa Servo provides an up-to-date list of online meetings and in-person events happening each week. Eventoj.hu describes events with a list and dates, and contains an archive until 1996.

== See also ==
- Outline of Esperanto
- Universal Esperanto Association
