= Lena Karpunina =

Russian Esperanto writer (1963–2013)

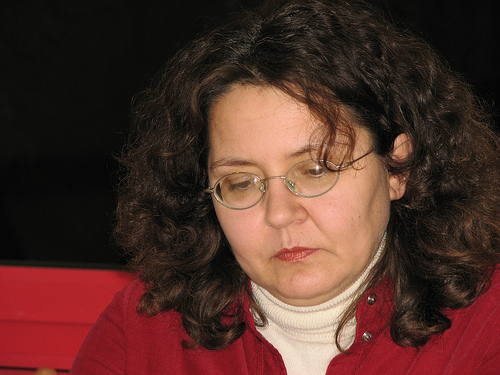
- Born: 1963; Kaluga, Soviet Union
- Died: November 4, 2013 (aged 49–50); Berlin, Germany
- Education: Tajik Technical University, Humboldt University of Berlin
- Occupation: Esperantist short story writer
- Writing career
- Language: Esperanto
- Notable works: La Bato (2001), Neokazinta Amo (2007)

Lena Karpunina (1963 — November 4, 2013; Russian: Елена Карпунина) was an Esperanto-language writer in Tajikistan (then a part of the Soviet Union). Born in what is now Russia, she grew up in the Tajik capital of Dushanbe, then was forced to leave for Germany due to the Tajikistani Civil War. From 2010 until her death, she was a member of the Akademio de Esperanto, chosen primarily in recognition of her work in the field of literature.

== Life ==
Jelena Karpunina, known as Lena, was born in 1963 in Kaluga, Soviet Union, in what is now Russia. She grew up in Dushanbe, the capital of what is now Tajikistan. After graduating from Tajik Technical University in 1986, she worked for various businesses in Tajikistan as a motor engineer. In 1988, she began to learn Esperanto. She traveled frequently to Esperanto meetings and congresses. Then, in 1993, during the Tajikistani Civil War, she moved to Berlin, where in 1997 she began studying German linguistics at Humboldt University. While in Germany, she married Gerd Bussing, a German Esperantist. She died in 2013 in Berlin.

== Literary writing ==
Karpunina was known for her contributions to Esperanto literature, which she began writing in the early 1990s. She published two books in Esperanto, both short story collections: La Bato ("The Blow") in 2001 and Neokazinta Amo ("Unrequited Love") in 2007. Both were published as part of the Serio Stafeto, a series published by the Flemish Esperanto League. She also contributed to the Esperanto magazine Monato, writing under the pen name "REGO." Her work frequently drew from her childhood experiences in Tajikistan, and her short stories have been described as "humanist" and "modern."

Her work earned her various awards in the Universal Esperanto Association's artistic competitions. In 2010, she was elected a member of the Akademio de Esperanto, and she was also a member of the Akademio Literatura de Esperanto, often contributing to its literary magazine Beletra Almanako.
