= Vilma Sindona Eichholz =

Vilma Sindona Eichholz (1926 - July 15, 1995) was a German-born Canadian Esperantist, teacher, and vice president of the Canadian Esperanto Association. She and her husband, Rüdiger Eichholz, were responsible for the propagation of Esperanto in Canada.

== Life ==
Eichholz was born in 1926 in Silesia, Weimar Germany. After fleeing Silesia at the end of World War II, she met Rüdiger Eichholz in western Germany and married him. In the early 1950s, the pair emigrated to Canada. They had three children, who they raised as native Esperanto speakers.

In 1979, Eichholz travelled to Sri Lanka and published a 12-page booklet about her experiences: Impresoj de esperantistino en Srilanko ("Impressions of an Esperantist in Sri Lanka") (Ontario, 1979). She was probably the first foreign Esperantist to visit the island nation. Her work there led to the birth of the Sri Lankan Esperanto movement and the Sri Lankan Esperanto Center in Nugegoda, which was founded by her student Daniel Balasingham Jesudason.

In the 1990s, after the dissolution of the Soviet Union, she taught Esperanto in Kaliningrad, among other places.

She died of cancer on July 15, 1995 in Bailieboro, Ontario.

== Works ==
Eichholz designed En Novan Mondon ("Into a New World") (1984), a complex Esperanto course for children using the Cseh method. She also wrote an English-language brochure on equitable bilingualism in Canada (1982), collaborated with her husband Rüdiger Eichholz in compiling the extensive anthology Esperanto in the Modern World (1982), and created instructional card games. She supported her husband's work on glossaries, revising, for example, the rough draft of the Esperanta Bildvortaro ("Esperanto Picture Dictionary") (1988). She also worked on neologisms and sexism in Esperanto, and supported her husband with respect to the publications of Esperanto Press.

She was a lifelong member of the Universala Esperanto-Asocio and a delegate on gardening.
