= Rüdiger Eichholz =

Canadian Esperantist (1922–2000)

Rüdiger Eichholz (May 1, 1922 in Stralsund, Germany – September 5, 2000 in Cobourg, Ontario), was a Canadian physicist and Esperantist and a member of the Esperanto Academy. (In Canada he often styled his first name as "Ruediger" or "Rudi".) He is best known for publishing the "Esperanto picture dictionary" (1988) and a massive anthology co-edited with his wife, Esperanto in the Modern World (1982).

== Propagation of Esperanto ==
In 1949, then living in Göttingen, West Germany, he became a delegate to the World Congress of Esperanto held in Bournemouth, England, but in 1953 he and his Esperantist wife Vilma (1926–1995) emigrated to Toronto, Canada and were thereafter pillars of the Esperanto movement. In 1956 they moved to a house they bought in the countryside near Oakville, 30 km west of Toronto. On July 18, 1959, he and Vilma opened their house as a cultural centre for Esperantists, and in July 1960 they hosted the second congress of the Canadian Esperanto Association (Kanada Esperanto-Asocio or KEA) after its reconstitution in 1958. In the years to follow, Vilma taught Esperanto courses there, and the couple founded several local Canadian Esperanto clubs. The Eichholz couple educated their son Alko and their daughters Suna and Brila as native Esperanto speakers.

== Editing and publishing ==
Eichholz purchased printing machinery and became a printer and publisher of books in Esperanto and of books about the language as well. A few of them were Vilma's works. Through his Esperanto Press, Eichholz printed periodicals and informational bulletins of the KEA. Because it was not possible to send money to Canada in some of the countries where he sold books, he accepted other Esperanto books in exchange, and so he also became a Canadian bookseller of Esperanto works published abroad. From that beginning grew the Libroservo de KEA ("KEA book service"). In 1961 he became editor of the periodical Kanada Esperanto-Revuo. At that time he and Vilma were also extremely active in publicizing Esperanto and his bookselling business had begun to take too much of his time, so he sold his book inventory to the KEA. Though he did not always agree with decisions of the association, he remained a passionate collaborator of the KEA for the rest of his life and was elected an honorary member in 1995.

He also published children's books Ni legas bildojn ("We read pictures," 1957) and Alko kaj Suna ("Alko and Suna," 1958), pamphlets on Unitarianism (1958), various books in and about Esperanto and several of his wife's books (such as the textbook En novan mondon ("Into the new world," 1984).

=== Two publication milestones ===
In 1988, Eichholz published the Esperanto picture dictionary (Esperanta Bildvortaro), a project on which he attracted no fewer than 143 collaborators in translation. The book was an Esperanto version of the well-known Duden German-language picture dictionary. He succeeded in getting permission from Duden, and accomplished the task of compiling and publishing it.

In 1980, having sold his house in Oakville, he moved to Bailieboro, Ontario, where he built a house on a property near the north shore of Rice Lake. The press was installed there, and Eichholz continued the work of Esperanto Press. He printed textbooks written by Vilma, an English-language version of Edmond Privat's The Life of Zamenhof and many other books. He also edited and printed the KEA magazine, now named Lumo.

For many years Eichholz had collected definitions of Esperanto words, and another major accomplishment for him was the compilation and printing in 1982 of the 600-page book "Esperanto in the Modern World" which he and Vilma co-edited.

=== Esperanto Academy ===
Elected as an Esperanto Academy member in 1976, Eichholz led its technical and specialized terminology section. From his multi-year collaborative collection of word definitions he first developed in 1968 his Slipara vortaro ("Filing dictionary") and later, in the computer age, the Perkomputora termino-kolekto ("Collected computer terms" or Pekoteko).

From 1983 to 1990 he edited six extensive volumes of Akademiaj studoj ("Academic studies"). In the World Esperanto Association (Universala Esperanto-Asocio or UEA), Eichholz was active as a committee member for Canada (1988–92) and for decades as a special-interest-group delegate for world federalism, Unitarianism and Esperanto terminology.

=== Sound recordings ===
Eichholz made audio tape recordings, from international Esperanto meetings and elsewhere, of famed Esperantists and of Esperanto radio broadcasts. On the basis of his collection of recorded audio tapes, in 1957 he founded the UEA Recorded Tapes Service and remained its director until 1991. For a small payment one could order copies of these items from his catalogue.

== Eichholz's last years ==
Fate dealt him a severe blow in 1994 when he returned from a visit to his native Germany. Vilma, who had stayed behind while Rüdiger went to Europe, was exhausted; the doctor diagnosed liver cancer. After several months' battle with cancer, Rudi's wife and close collaborator died in July 1995. He wanted to find young Esperantist couples, perhaps in Europe, who might want to lodge with him in Bailieboro and take on the labor of Esperanto Press. He advertised in Esperanto periodicals and searched in various ways but without success. Eventually he had to abandon the possibility of continuing with the publication work.

In May 2000 he sold his house and moved to a seniors residence in Cobourg. Because he had to disperse all the goods in the house, he donated his remaining stock of books and documents to the Canadian Esperanto Association, which received approximately 2,000 copies of Esperanto in the modern world without charge. Unfortunately, he did not have much time to enjoy his retirement. On August 26 he suffered a stroke; he died in hospital ten days later, on September 5, 2000.

== Works ==
- Ruediger Eichholz and Vilma Sindona Eichholz, eds., Esperanto en la Moderna Mondo, Esperanto in the Modern World: Studies and Articles on Language Problems, the Right to Communicate, and the International Language (1959–1982), Bailieboro, Ontario: Esperanto Press, 1982. ISBN 0-919186-18-1
- Rüdiger Eichholz, "Esperanto kiel interlingvo en maŝina tradukado" in Serta gratulatoria in honorem Juan Régulo. Universidad de La Laguna, Salamanca, 3,266 pp., 1986 ISBN 84-600-4290-1
- Esperanta Bildvortaro, tr. Rüdiger Eichholz. Esperanto Press: Bailieboro, Ontario, 1988.
- Rüdiger Eichholz, "Principoj por selekto de fakaj termino" in La stato kaj estonteco de la internacia lingvo Esperanto (Proceedings of the first symposium of the Esperanto Academy (Prague, 1994). Petr Chrdle, ed., LinkKava-Pech: Prague, 1995, 190 pp. ISBN 80-85853-08-6
