= Komputeko =

Komputeko.net

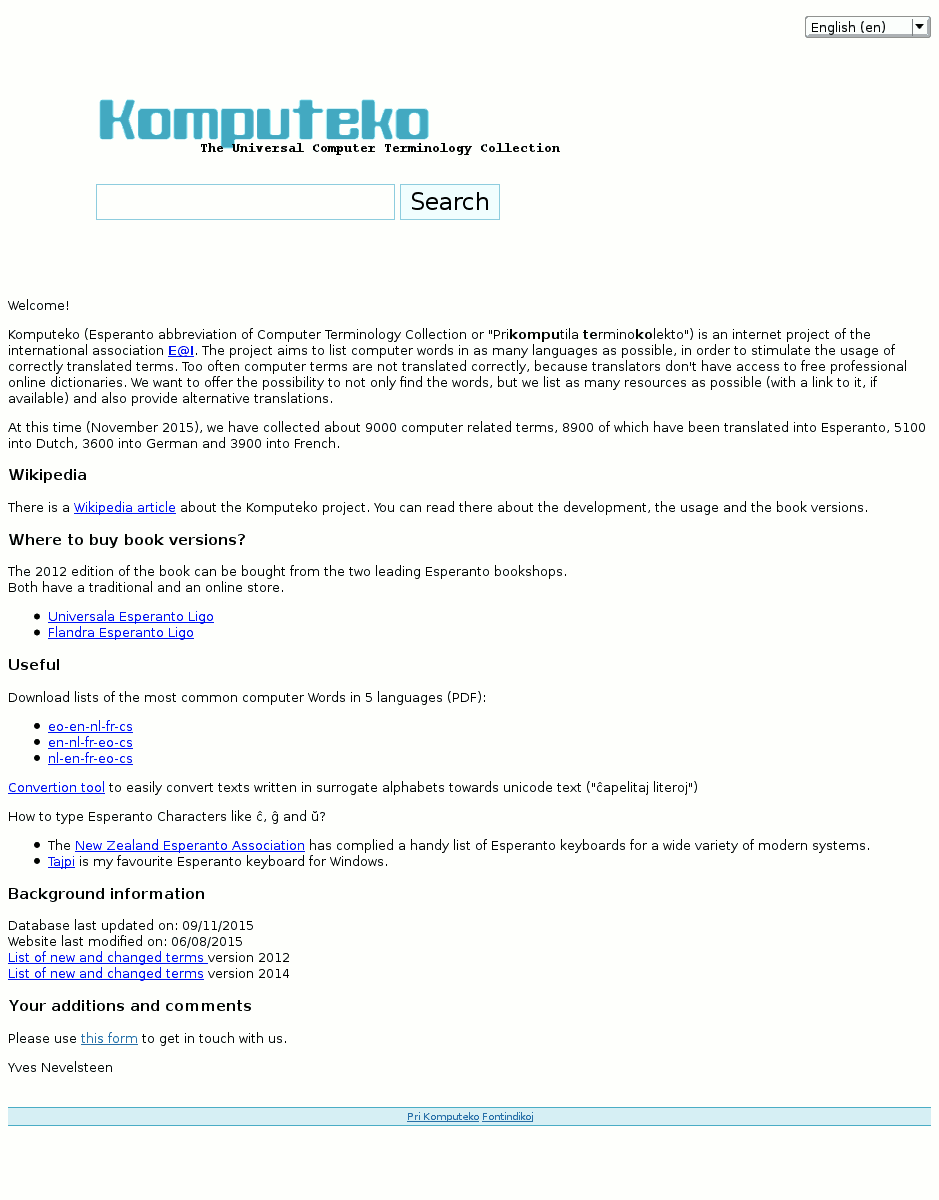
- The English home page of Komputeko.net showing a search box
- Website type: Multilingual online dictionary
- Available in: Esperanto, English, Dutch, French, German
- Creator: E@I
- Website: komputeko.net
- Commercial: No
- Current status: active
- Content license: CC BY-SA

Cover of the Komputeko book, edition 2008

Komputeko is an online project of the non-profit youth organization E@I (“Education@Internet”) with the goal of bringing together parallel computer terminology from various dictionaries in order to facilitate access to and comparison between different translations and thus promote exact use of language and counteract the (often sloppy) usage of linguistic borrowings from American English. Komputeko is short for the Esperanto noun phrase "Prikomputila terminokolekto", meaning "collection of computer terms". The dictionary is written in five languages (Esperanto, English, Dutch, German and French), and there are plans to expand it into other languages. A preliminary version with a few other languages already exists.

== Development of Komputeko ==
The Esperanto dictionaries and word lists on which Komputeko is based are the Komputada Leksikono ("Computing Lexicon") by Sergio Pokrovskij (Сергей Покровский), the crowd-sourced Reta Vortaro ("Internet Dictionary", ReVo, the Plena Ilustrita Vortaro de Esperanto ("Complete Illustrated Dictionary of Esperanto", PIV), the Internet mini-dictionary of the Flandra Esperanto-Ligo, the Techniczny Słownik Polsko Esperancki ("Polish-Esperanto Technical Dictionary") by Jerzy Wałaszek, the three-volume Pekoteko collection of terminology, Bill Walker's Komputilo Vortolisto and a Dutch-Esperanto dictionary. It also takes into account the terminology used in articles from the Esperanto Wikipedia.

The promoter of the project, Yves Nevelsteen, among other things, joined the Esperanto translation team for the open-source productivity suite OpenOffice.org, the social networking site Ipernity and the content management system Drupal in order to make these teams' work product more widely available through Komputeko.

== Usage of Komputeko ==
Among scholars who have acknowledged the utility of the Komputeko project are John C. Wells, who authored both the Teach Yourself Books' Concise Esperanto and English Dictionary (1969) and the concise yet comprehensive English-Esperanto-English Dictionary (Mondial, 2010), and Paul Peeraerts, who translated the interface of Ipernity and Facebook into Esperanto and who has served as editorial secretary of the Esperanto-language monthly Monato. Others who have availed themselves of Komputeko include Cindy McKee's KDE and Joomla translation teams, Esperanto Wikipedia founder Chuck Smith's Drupal translation and the former Amikumu projects, Tim Morley's OpenOffice.org translation team, Guillaume Savaton's GNOME translation team, the translation teams for Plone and Xfce, and Joop Kiefte's Ubuntu translation team.

== Book versions of Komputeko ==
- 2008: Yves Nevelsteen, Komputeko (1st edition). Published by Espero, Partizánske, Slovakia. 92 pages. ISBN 978-80-969533-9-4
  - This version benefited from the linguistic advice of Cindy McKee and Bertilo Wennergren, while Mauro La Torre (1946–2010), Paul Peeraerts and Lode Van de Velde served as proofreaders.
- 2012: Yves Nevelsteen, Komputeko (2nd edition). Published by Espero, Partizánske, Slovakia. 124 pages. ISBN 978-80-89366-14-9
  - Edmund Grimley Evans's extensive annotations on the first edition helped improve the second edition, for which the chief proofreader was Marek Blahuš. The new edition, which has 7,800 headwords and incorporated over 500 additions and modifications from the previous edition, coincided with a major update to the online project's website.
