= Quebec Esperanto Society =

Language association in Canada

The Quebec Esperanto Society (Esperanto: Esperanto-Societo Kebekia, French: Société québécoise d'espéranto) is the main association of speakers of the planned language Esperanto in the Canadian province of Quebec. Founded in 1982, its main goals are the advancement of knowledge about Esperanto in Quebec, the promotion of its use, and the organization of Esperanto language courses and activities where Esperanto may be used in a natural social context.

The Quebec Esperanto Society is active in publishing, not only putting out a quarterly newsletter La Riverego for most of the past twenty years, but also in publishing books, most notably an Esperanto translation of Robert Dutil's Nanatasis (2005). The QES hosted the 7th Esperanto Congress of the Americas (TAKE) in Montreal from July 12 to 18, 2008.
