= Ada Fighiera Sikorska =

Polish Esperantist

Ada Fighiera-Sikorska
- At her wedding in 1960
- Born: 26 January 1929; Siedlce
- Died: 7 August 1996 (aged 67); Turin

Ada Fighiera-Sikorska or Ada Sikorska (26 January 1929 – 7 August 1996) was a Polish Esperantist. She edited the leading newspaper in Esperanto for thirty years. A was a member of the World Association of Esperanto Journalists (TEĴA), the Union of Esperanto Speakers Writers (EVA), the Esperanto PEN Club and an honorary member of the World Esperanto Association (UEA).

== Life ==
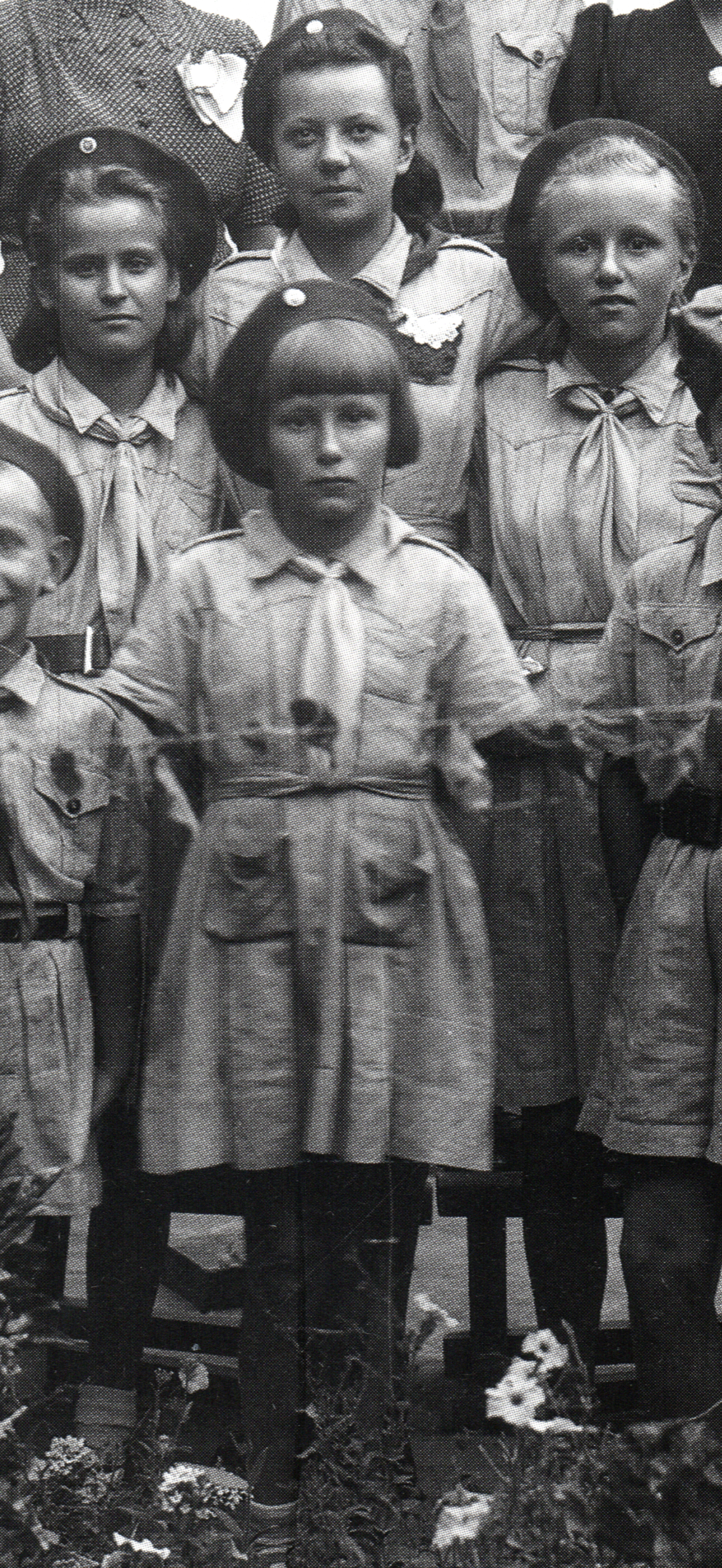
Ada Sikorska (middle row, R) during her years in Isfahan with her sister Maria (bottom) and her schoolmates Maria Gordziejko (middle row, L) and Aleksandra Jarmulska (top), all in Polish scouts uniform

Fighiera-Sikorska was born in Siedlce in 1929 to General Franciszek Sikorski and pianist Maria née Schmar (d. 1977). She grew up in Warsaw. In face of the German Invasion of Poland on 1 September 1939, which marks the beginning of World War II, she and her family fled to east of Poland, namely to Lviv which was Polish at that time. Her father, General Franciszek Sikorski, organized the city's defence. But then the totally unexpected Soviet invasion of Poland began on 17th September, and with it the Soviet repressions of Polish citizens. The female members of the family, Ada, her mother and her sister Maria (b. 1931), were deported to Siberia. Her father ended up in the special NKVD camp for Polish POWs in Starobelsk and was shot dead with ca 3,800 inmates in spring 1940 in Kharkov as part of the massacre of nearly 22 thousand Polish officers and reservists and policeman collectively called the Katyn massacre.

In 1941 the USSR freed two million Polish civilians interned in Siberia. In 1942 Ada, with her mother and sister, could go through Samarkand to Tehran, and then to Isfahan, where she went to the Polish school. Between 1945 and January 1948 she lived with other Polish refugees in Beirut; in 1948 she passed the Polish Matura exam in Great Britain. In November she returned to Poland after eight years of absence.

She graduated in Polish literature, specializing in journalism, at the University of Warsaw before starting her first job in a publishing house. In 1956 she participated in Esperanto language courses in Warsaw led by Julio Baghy.

In 1958, before the jubilee World Esperanto Congress in Warsaw, she became the vice president of the Warsaw Esperanto Society and a member of the Esperanto editorial office of the Polish Radio. She then met her future husband, who was a member of the Standing Congress Committee (Konstancja Kongres Kongato) preparing the congress. In 1960, she married Gian Carlo Fighier in Brussels. A year later she worked with him to organize the World Esperanto Congress in Harrogate.

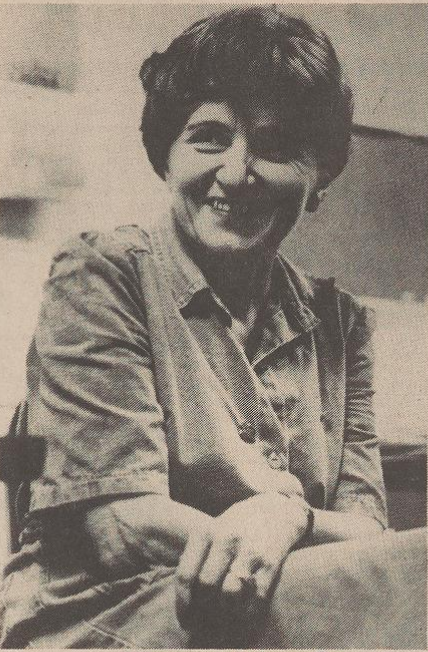
Ada Fighiera-Sikorska in 1984

In 1962, Fighiera-Sikorska took over the Esperanto magazine Heroldo de Esperanto, which she edited for 36 years until her death: The magazine was published for seventeen years in Brussels, then for nine years in Madrid and finally, from 1988, in Turin. She participated in international, national and regional congresses and meetings of Esperanto as a teacher and lecturer.

Ada died at the age of 67 in Turin from an incurable spine and liver disease. At her request, the body was cremated. Her ashes are stored in the columbarium of the main cemetery in Turin (A2 quarter - no. 24).
