= Taiwan Esperanto Association =

Organization

The Taiwan Esperanto Association was a Taiwanese society founded to promote Esperanto. It was active in Taiwan under Japanese rule, notably Taipei, during the 1920s and 1930s. Its predecessor was the Japan Esperanto Association, Taiwan Branch, founded in 1913 by Kodama Shirō (児玉四郎). (The new Tajvana Esperantista Asocio, founded 1990, is historically unrelated.) The society exchanged its official monthly publication, La Verda Ombro ("The Green Shade"; 1919–1924), with many similar-minded societies overseas. The well-known political activist Ren Onkyō (連 温卿) was the main editor.

In the early 1930s, the society was active in internationalist politics unrelated to Esperanto promotion. In 1932, for example, it attempted to publish an article in a leading paper condemning Japan's invasion of Manchuria; the article was censored by the Japanese authorities. In the following year it took part in an alliance to protest Adolf Hitler.

Publication:

- Organized Study of Esperanto, a Textbook (in Japanese)

== See also ==
- List of Esperanto organizations
