= Plouézec International Meetings =

The Breton village of Plouézec (in French) or Ploueg-ar-Mor (in Breton) has hosted an International Meeting annually since 1997. The working language of the meeting is Esperanto, and the meeting covers diverse activities — tourism, socialising, yoga, choral singing, theatre, computing, using an abacus, Breton language for beginners, and origami. There are also dedicated Esperanto courses for participants with all levels of fluency, from beginners through intermediate levels all the way to specialised workshops in translation, language teaching, or specific aspects of Esperanto grammar. The 20th such meeting in 2016 included the second Pan-Celtic Esperanto Congress, and the next international meeting is planned there for mid-August 2017 .

== The 9th Plouézec International Meeting in 2005 ==
From 13 to 20 August 2005, Plouézec welcomed the largest group of participants to date: 188 people including 28 children and teenagers, from around a dozen countries.

In the 2005 Meeting there were eight simultaneous Esperanto courses running every morning of the meeting, with the usual range of afternoon activities. There was also the opportunity to take the first and second level exams in Esperanto.

In the evening, there were talks about an Australian National Park, the travels of Zeférin Jégard (a local Esperanto-speaking grandfather who has spent a number of years cycling vast distances across the globe) and the Esperanto centre in La-Chaud-de-Fonds, as well as sketches, songs, dancing, and a closing party on the last night.
