= Two Diseases in Esperanto =

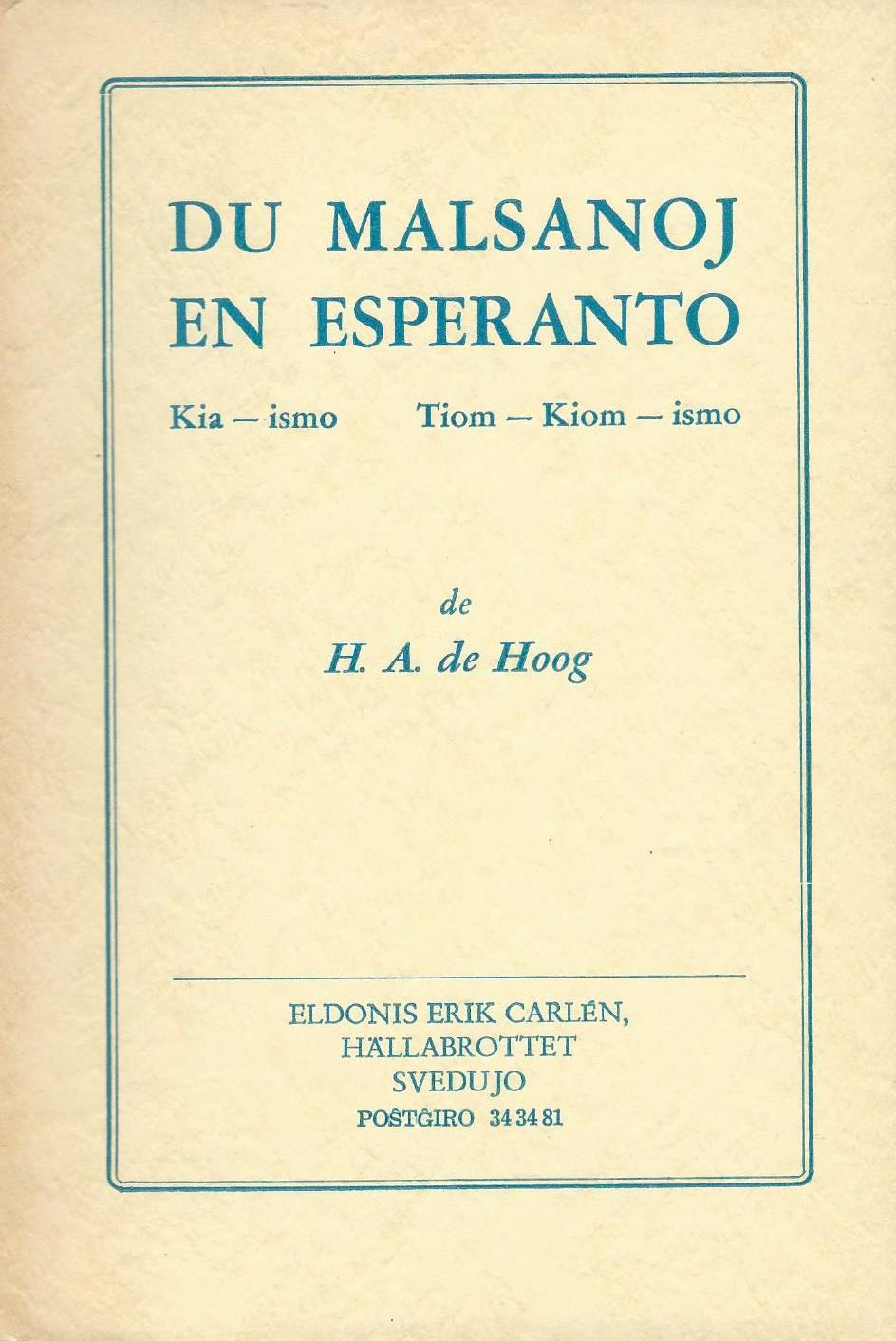
- Author: Hendrik Arie de Hoog
- Original title: Du Malsanoj en Esperanto
- Language: Esperanto
- Subject: Esperanto grammar
- Genre: Linguistics
- Published: 1954
- Publication place: Sweden
- Pages: 140
- ISBN: 91-7303-136-4

Two Diseases in Esperanto (Esperanto: Du Malsanoj en Esperanto) is a book written by Hendrik Arie de Hoog and edited by Erik Carlén, published in Sweden in 1954. It deals with the so-called kia‑ism and tiom‑kiom‑ism in Esperanto. De Hoog recommended following the examples of the language's creator, L. L. Zamenhof, concerning Esperanto correlatives.

== Rules ==
=== Kia‑ism ===
The author argues:

From my current articles you can distill three simple rules:

1. After a noun, one uses kiel if the comparison is expressed by a phrase.
2. One uses kia if the comparison is expressed by a complete sentence.
3. One uses kiu if the comparative meaning of the dependent clause is extremely weak (such as after la sama ("the same") or is missing entirely.

The extremely rare cares in which kiel is necessary to introduce a comparative dependent clause do not really have practical value.

The word tia does not necessarily always require the use of kia.

Maybe my three rules will still seem difficult. But, make an attempt, and you will observe how naturally and easily you will learn to use them. The overly‑strict and linguistically absurd rule of using tia‑kia requires constantly stopping your thoughts so that you can "complete" phrases which did not previously appear as "incomplete".

=== Tiom‑kiom‑ism ===
Here, the author states:

If one wishes to present the whole tiom/tiel conflict in one thesis, I believe that the following description is accurate and concise: Expressions of degree are not a matter for analytical definition, rather of (often comparative) descriptions of phenomena.

- It is not for analytical definition! Thus one cannot "solve the problem" with abstract theorizing. The argument: The iel‑series express the manner, the iom‑series express the quantity, and in order to express degree I would require a third series, which is unfortunately missing in Esperanto. These arguments are proof of crude misconception! To talk about "errors in Zamenhof's formation," about "io kio not being logically in order," about "the existence of a serious error which we wish to correct" only proves the shallowness of those statements. Because:
- Statements of degree are for the description of phenomena! Thus it can happen with any language's resources. Here it is expressed with original adverbs like tre, tro, pli, or with derivatives: sufiĉe, multe, forte, terure; or it is indicated by some adjective, or with some affix; or if you need a comparison, then it is described based on the result; and nouns themselves express it, and some nouns require all the adjuncts.

...It turns out especially that the connection between manner and degree is so strong, that it cannot be detached.

All words can express degree, but particularly the indicative or exclamatory words. Often only a stronger accent is sufficient for the sense of the word to have minor comparative value. Tio is valid with tiel, kiel, tiom, kiom, or equally by tia and kia.

Example: Kia vetero! can express a degree of goodness or (according to the circumstances) of badness.

- Estia tia ventego ke la arboj reversiĝis: Degree of strength.
- Ĉu li vere loĝas tie: degree of distance.

It is not an accident that all languages have only a few adverbs that solely deal with degrees (in Esperanto: tro, tre, pli), but use other means. This gives language the ability to express dozens of nuances of degree, which makes them rich and flexible instruments.

It is not a pity that Zamenhof did not create a separate correlative series for degree. This should be the cause for great happiness, because if it did exist, no one would know how to use it correctly, and the misfortune that would befall us notwithstanding its use, would make us feel shackled and trapped in a metal straitjacket.

There is not chaotic lawlessness in Zamenhof's use of ‑iel and ‑iom words. Whoever asserts as much has not taken the time to explore the subject.

On the contrary: Zamenhof reserved himself some freedom, but acted regularly and logically, as well as conservatively, so that Esperanto would have the same potential as any natural language.

But really the tiom‑kiom‑ism impoverishes Esperanto, requiring uniformity where diverse nuances demand diversity. It is not good that the tiom‑kiom style impresses rigidity, on account of the weight that users impose on themselves. I do not doubt for a moment that the "correction" presented by tiom‑kiom‑ism belongs to that category of reforms, Zamenhof's opinion of which would be: "90% of them are absolutely unnecessariy, or even actually harmful!" (L. de Z. I 196).

== Reviews ==
The author shows the correct method from the modern linguistic viewpoint.

— Edmond Privat

I find the book to be superb in every way, and very helpful in terms of orthodox support and defense of our language.

— Juan Régulo Pérez

Not only grammarians, but also lay people will find in it striking arguments and will read every paragraph with delight.

— Félicien Baronnet

Here we have a masterful brief on a subject that confuses many, including me, and it merits serious attention. The argument is (for me) convincing.

— Montagu Christie Butler

One will be all the happier that a grammar has been found that if nothing else is not boring. For anyone who wants to learn methodically and impartially, clearly and intelligently, grammatical questions, for anyone who wants to learn about Zamenhof's linguistic capabilities, for anyone who wants to read sensible presentations on serious topics, I wholeheartedly recommend this book, which I regard as a masterpiece of linguistics in our canon.

— Gaston Waringhien

== Criticism ==
In contrast to the reviews above, Patrik Austin criticized the reasoning of the work in a satirical article. He also suggests that de Hoog is not truly concerned with whether the language is Zamenhof's or not, but is only dissatisfied with comparisons using kia and kiom.

Another criticism came from Richard Schulz:

Only slightly less grave is the often incorrect use of the correlatives tiel and kiel. Unfortunately, due to the influence of his native language, Zamenhof himself caused the misuse of those words to be firmly rooted, and then de Hoog's book publicly condemns the replacement of the correct words tiom and kiom before adjectives and adverbs is such a disease in Esperanto. Such is the true state of Esperanto today. Correct usage is a disease. Erroneous uses, which have become normal, are regarded as correct.

— Richard Schulz, On the Path of the Analyst School, p. 33.
