= Buenos Aires Esperanto Association =

- Bonaera Esperanto-Asocio
- Abbreviation: BEA
- Predecessor: Argentine Esperanto Association
- Formation: 1916
- Type: Non-profit
- Legal status: Active
- Headquarters: 2357 Paraguay st
- Location: Buenos Aires, Argentina
- Region served: Greater Buenos Aires
- Official language: Esperanto, Spanish
- Website: EsperantoBEA

The Buenos Aires Esperanto Association (BEA; Esperanto: Bonaera Esperanto-Asocio, Spanish: Asociación Buenos Aires de Esperanto) is an independent non-profit organization first established in 1916, which aims to spread and support Esperanto in Buenos Aires, Argentina.

== History ==
The organization is a pioneer in the Esperanto movement in Argentina. It was founded on December 20, 1916, as the Argentine Esperanto Association. Created as a nationwide association, its name was changed to the Buenos Aires Esperanto Association on April 12, 1941, when the Argentine Esperanto League was born, and its scope was reduced to Greater Buenos Aires.
