= Interrogatives in Esperanto =

Aspect of language

In Esperanto there are two kinds of interrogatives: yes–no interrogatives, and correlative interrogatives.

== Yes–no interrogatives ==
Yes–no questions are formed with the interrogative ĉu "whether" at the beginning of the clause. For example, the interrogative equivalent of the statement La pomo estas sur la tablo "The apple is on the table" is Ĉu la pomo estas sur la tablo? "Is the apple on the table?" A yes–no question is also normally accompanied by a rising intonation.In some cases, especially when the context makes it clear that the sentence is an interrogative, a rising intonation alone can make a clause into a question, but this is uncommon and highly marked. The subject and the verb are not normally inverted to form questions as in English and many other European languages.

== Correlative interrogatives ==
Esperanto has a series of words that can be arranged in a table according to how they start and end. These are usually called correlatives. The column of words that begin with ki- can be used to ask questions that cannot be answered by yes or no. These correspond to wh-questions in English. These words are:

- kiu - who or which
- kio - what
- kia - what kind of
- kie - where
- kiam - when
- kies - whose
- kiel - how
- kial - why
- kiom - how much or how many

These words are inflected according to the role they play in the clause (for the words that take an inflection), and moved to the beginning of the clause. For example, Kion vi faras? - What are you doing? Kiu has the usual dual function of adjectives: standing alone as proform, or modifying a noun, as in "Kiu tago?" (which day?). Kio is exclusively used standing alone. As with yes–no questions, there is no inversion of subject and verb, and the sentence is generally ended with a rising intonation in the spoken language.

== Indirect questions ==
As explained above, any interrogative clause can be used as-is as an indirect question, e.g. as the object of a verb like scii, to know:

- Mi ne scias, ĉu la pomo estas sur la tablo. - I don't know whether the apple is on the table.
- Li scias, kion vi faras. - He knows what you are doing.

== Ambiguity ==
Because the correlatives that begin with ki- are also used to form relative clauses (similarly to many European languages) there is in theory a potential for ambiguity between indirect questions and relative clauses. In practice, however, confusion is very rare.
