= Félicien Menu de Ménil =

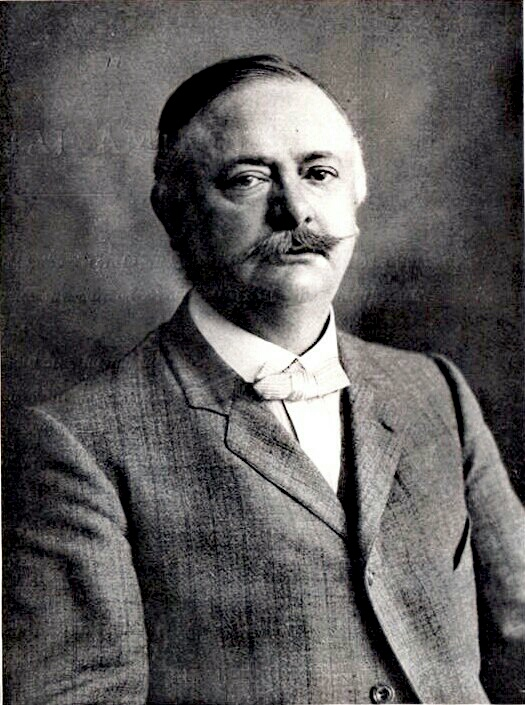
Félicien Menu de Ménil

Félicien Menu de Ménil (16 July 1860 – 28 March 1930) was a French composer and Esperanto enthusiast best known for his musical setting of L. L. Zamenhof's poem "La Espero". He was also the editor of and a contributor to La Revuo.

== Works ==
- (in Esperanto) Menu de Ménil, Félicien, "La Mortigistoj de Stradella", short story published in the magazine La Revuo, September 1906
- (in Esperanto) Menu de Ménil, Félicien, Muzika Terminaro, 1908
- (in French) Menu de Ménil, Félicien, Les préjuges contre l'espéranto, 1908
- (in French) Menu de Ménil, Félicien, L'Héritage Klodarec, one-act comedy, 1906
