= Akademio Literatura de Esperanto =

Esperanto literary organization

- Formation: 2008
- President: Mauro Nervi
- Website: http://www.everk.it/

The Akademio Literatura de Esperanto (ALE; English: Literature Academy of Esperanto) is an independent and neutral institution which aims to encourage the creative and artistic literary production in the Esperanto language. Officially founded on July 24, 2008, it has been inspired by the efforts made by Esperantlingva Verkista Asocio (English: Esperanto Writers Association). In 2021 the ALE began organizing the Intercultural Short Story Competition in Esperanto. The academy should not be confused with the Akademio de Esperanto, whose goal is to steward the evolution of the language.
