= Panamerican Esperanto Congress =

Meeting of Esperanto speakers

The Panamerican Esperanto Congress (Esperanto: Tut-Amerika Kongreso de Esperanto, TAKE) begun as an irregular meeting of Esperanto speakers in the Americas, and, starting with the third Congress, has been held approximately every third year under the aegis of the Committee for the Americas of the Universal Esperanto Association.

The Congress aims to strengthen solidarity among Esperantists of North, Central and South America, advance the general goals of the movement, and study its problems. The Congress organizers try to have a program with a variety of topics, so to be of interest to both specialists and non-specialists interested in gaining familiarity with individual, group and official activities of the Esperanto movement in the various countries of the Americas and around the world. In addition to the official part of the program, the Congress offers many opportunities for education and entertainment aiming to familiarize the Congress participants with the host country.

== List of the Congresses ==
1. 1978: Marília, Brazil
2. 1980: San Luis, Argentina
3. 1996: San José, Costa Rica; Congress theme: "Pan-American Activity"
4. 1999 Jan - Feb: Bogotá, Colombia; 63 participants from 12 countries
5. 2001 15-21 April: Mexico City, Mexico; 169 registrants from 29 countries; Congress theme: "America: One Continent, Many Histories"
6. 2004: Havana, Cuba; 178 participants from 19 countries; Congress theme: "What kind of Esperanto movement for the Americas?"
7. 2008: Montreal, Canada; 222 registrants from 24 countries (193 participated), July 12-18; Congress theme: "Ecosystems, languages, cultures: diversity for a sustainable development in the Americas"
8. 2011: São Paulo, Brazil; Congress theme: "The process of regional integration in the American continent, the role of Esperanto"
