= Conference on the Application of Esperanto in Science and Technology =

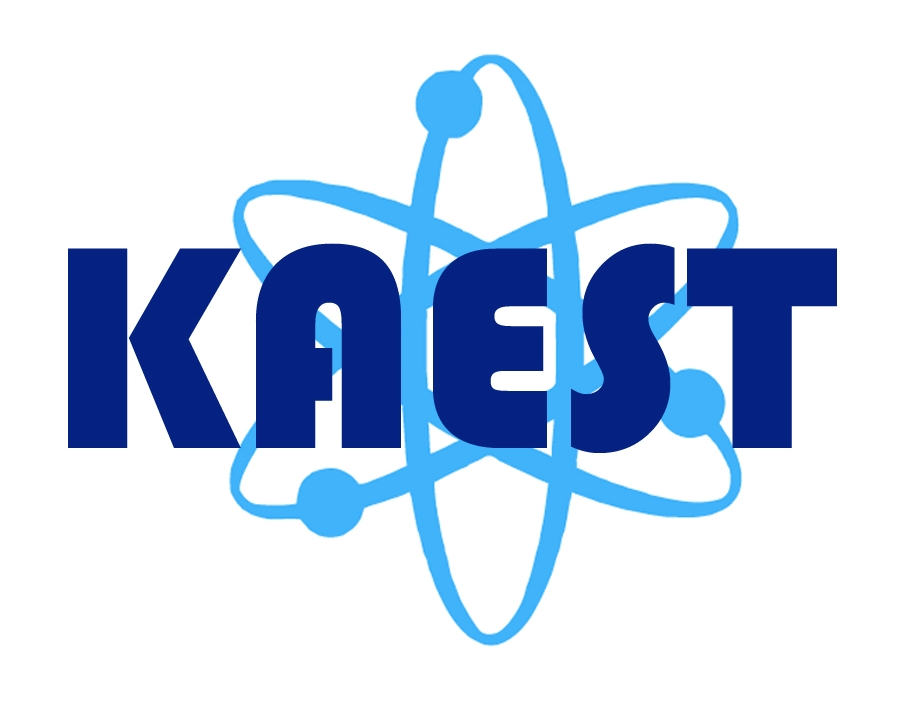

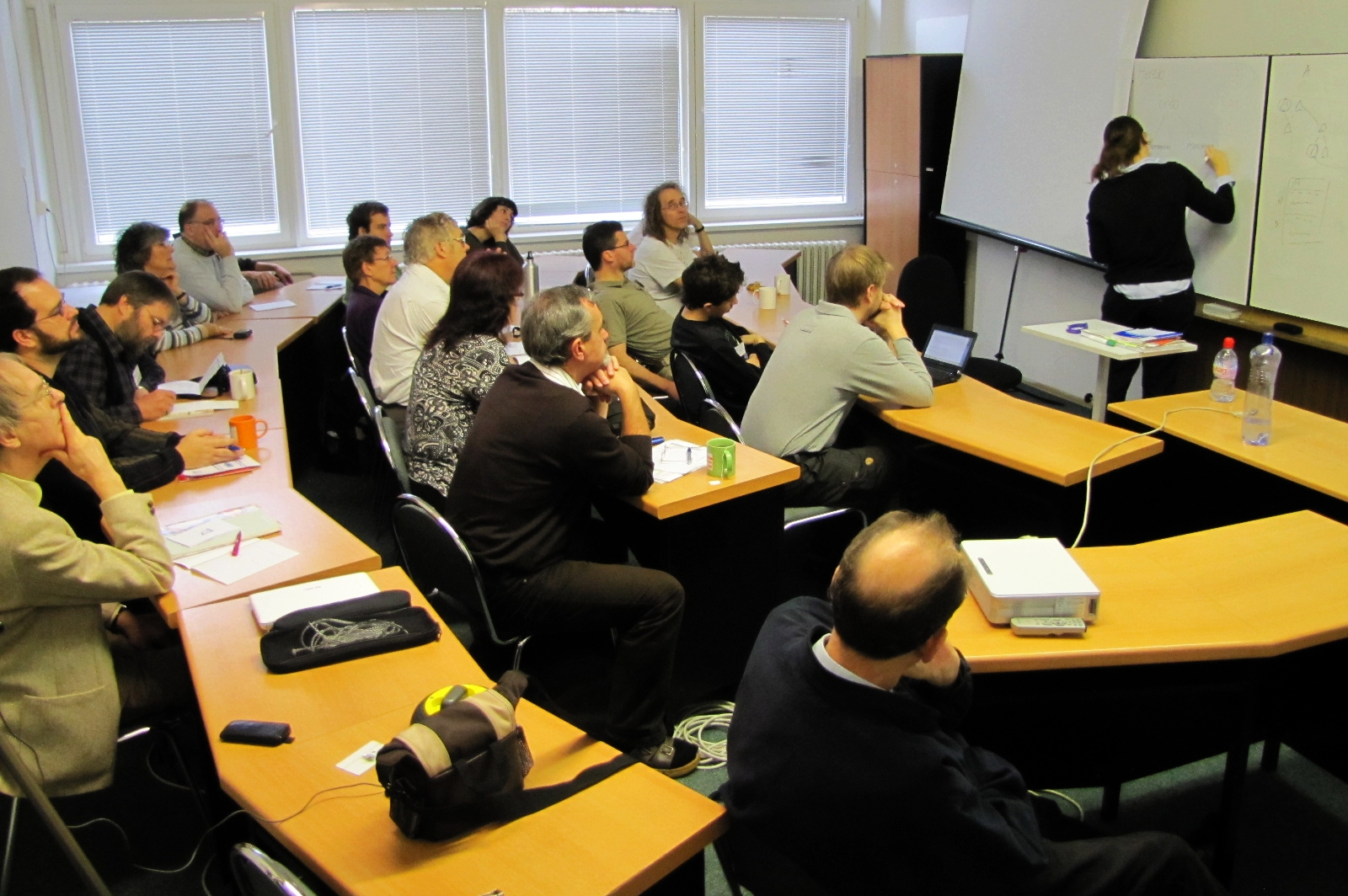
- Mélanie Maradan's talk on terminology during KAEST 2010
- Status: Active
- Genre: Esperanto, science and technology
- Frequency: Biennial
- Country: Czechoslovakia (1978–1989), Czech Republic (1998–2008), Slovakia (2010–present)
- Years active: Since 1978
- Inaugurated: 1978
- Most recent: 2024
- Organiser: E@I (since 2010)
- Website: kaest.ikso.net

The Conference on the Application of Esperanto in Science and Technology (Esperanto: Konferenco pri Aplikoj de Esperanto en Scienco kaj Tekniko, KAEST) is a biennial conference on the application of the constructed international auxiliary language Esperanto in the science and technology community.

The conference first took place in 1978 in Czechoslovakia. Following the dissolution of Czechoslovakia, it remained in the Czech Republic until it was transferred in 2010 to Slovakia, where it is currently being organized by the nonprofit organization E@I. The 2012 KAEST in Modra, Slovakia included a Wikipedia workshop aimed at both beginners and advanced users, organized in cooperation with Wikimedia Slovakia.

== Past and scheduled conferences ==
1. AEST 1978, Žilina: (no specific topic)
2. SAEST 1980, Ústí nad Labem: The environment today and tomorrow. Problems of specialist language and translation
3. AEST 1981, Žilina: Application of computers
4. SAEST 1982, České Budějovice: Energy – the global problem. Problems of specialist language and translation
5. SAEST 1984, Brno: Perspectives of global food production. Problems of specialist language and translation
6. AEST 1988, Poprad: Rationalization in science and technology
7. SAEST 1989, Strážnice: Rail transportation
8. KAEST 1998, Prague: Modern means of communication. Terminological problems
9. KAEST 2000, Prague: Specialist applications of Esperanto. Economy on the threshold of the third millennium
10. KAEST 2002 (8–10 November), Dobřichovice: Specialist studies in Esperanto. Electronic resources.
11. KAEST 2004, Dobřichovice: Talking Esperanto in science and talking sciences in Esperanto
12. KAEST 2006, Dobřichovice: The language and the Internet and other studies
13. KAEST 2008, Dobřichovice: (no specific topic)
14. KAEST 2010 (18–21 November), Modra: Modern technologies for Esperanto
15. KAEST 2012 (15–18 November), Modra: Modern educational methods and technologies
16. KAEST 2014 (13–16 November), Modra: Archives and libraries — how to protect and keep our heritage
17. KAEST 2016 (17-20 November), Modra: Advantages and challenges of modern communication
18. KAEST 2018 (18-21 October), Modra: Evolution of paradigms in science and technology
19. KAEST 2020 (17-20 November), online: Science and technology as means to implement sustainable development
20. KAEST 2024 (7-10 November), Žilina: Esperanto and language learning in the era of artificial intelligence and virtual reality

== Literature ==
- Nosková, Katarína; Baláž, Peter (ed.). Modernaj teknologioj por Esperanto. Proceedings of KAEST 2010. Partizánske : Espero for E@I, 2011. 323 pp. Text in Esperanto, abstracts in Esperanto, English and Slovak. Circulation 300 copies. ISBN 978-80-89366-10-1.
- Nosková, Katarína; Baláž, Peter (ed.). Modernaj edukaj metodoj kaj teknologioj. Proceedings of KAEST 2012. Partizánske : Espero for E@I, 2013. 239 pages. Text in Esperanto, abstracts in Esperanto, English and Slovak. ISBN 978-80-89366-21-7
