= Château de Grésillon =

Coordinates: 47.5513°N 0.0823°W

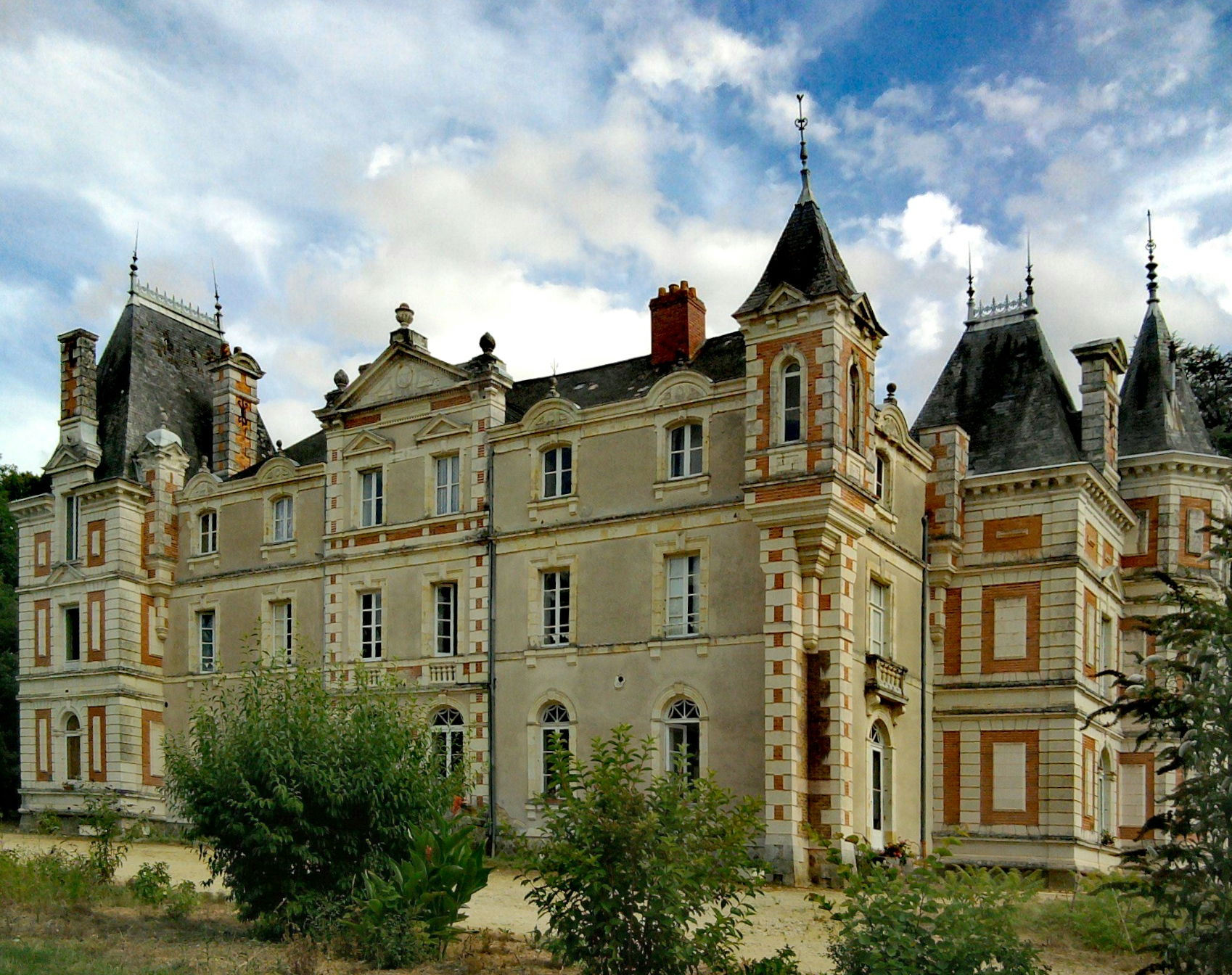
Château de Grésillon

The Château de Grésillon (Esperanto: Kastelo Greziljono) is situated 250 km to the southwest of Paris in Baugé between Angers, Le Mans and Tours in France.

The nonprofit organization "Cultural House of French Esperanto Speakers," established in 1951, owns the château with an 18 hectare park (about 0.2 square kilometers). It is frequently visited by students of Esperanto from all around the world, especially in summer.
