= Heroldo de Esperanto =

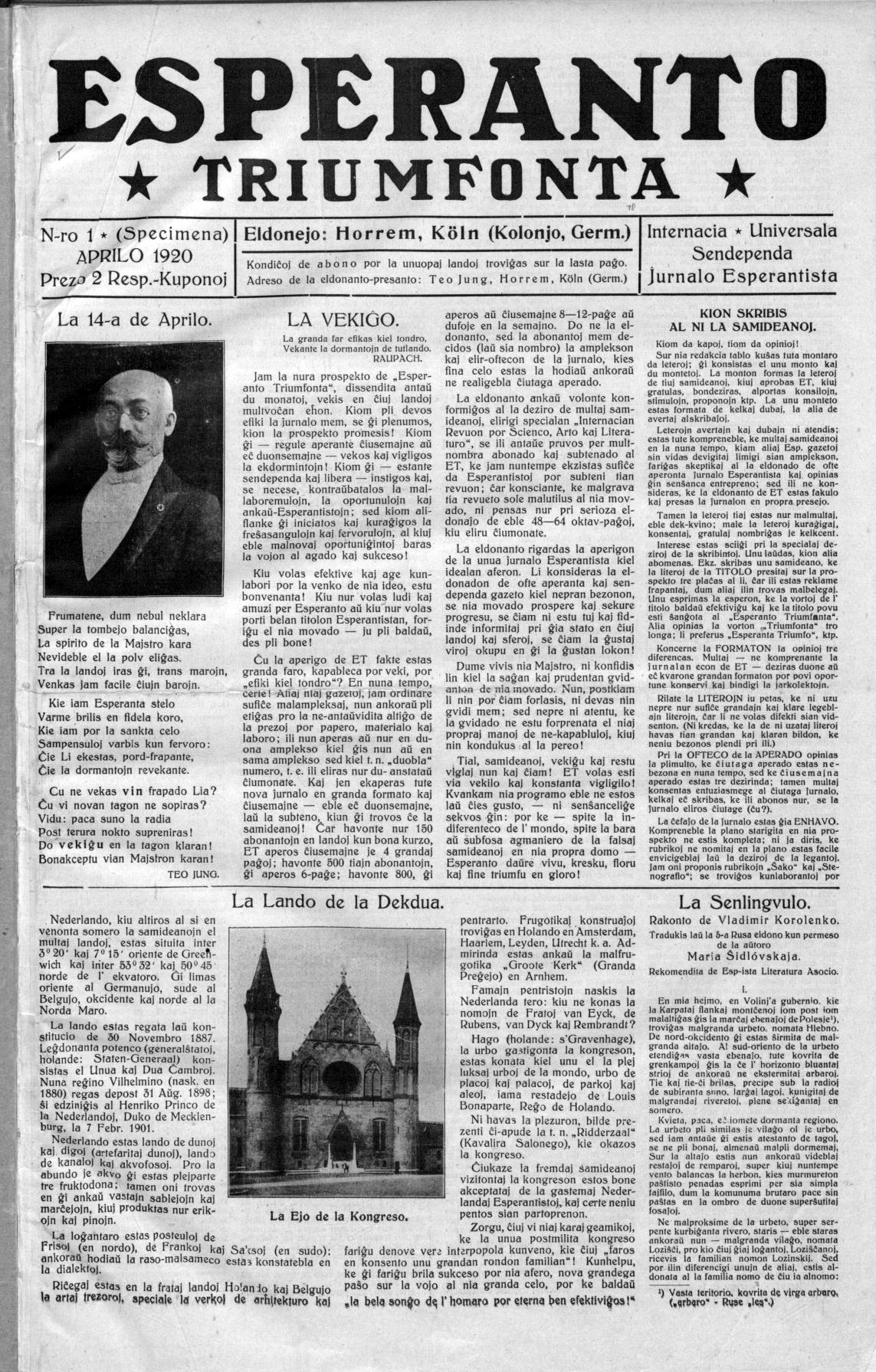
Heroldo de Esperanto

Heroldo de Esperanto (English: Esperanto Herald) is a magazine published in Esperanto. It was founded in 1920 by Teo Jung in Cologne under the name of Esperanto Triumfonta and was edited by Jung from 1920 to 1961.

In the years before the Second World War it appeared on a weekly basis. It survived until 1936, when it was closed down by the German Nazi Party authorities and its presses were confiscated.

Jung and his wife left Germany for the Netherlands, where he began publishing again. After a break during the war, the paper again appeared, but this time was published fortnightly.

The editorship was held by Ada Fighiera Sikorska from 1962 until 1996. In 1966 the paper was sold to LF-koop in Switzerland and the editorship was undertaken by Perla Martinelli until the publication of issue no. 2000. Stano Marček then edited it for 2 years.

Under the ownership of LF-koop it has become independent of the traditional Esperanto movement. At present it is edited by a multinational editorial committee and appears on a three-weekly basis. The content is overwhelmingly concerned with the activities of the Esperanto movement.

In June 2016 the paper was sold to Lexus publishing house in Brazil, whose editorship will begin in January 2017; but only one number was published after December 2016.

In January 2018 the paper was sold to Kultura Centro Esperantista (Esperanto Cultural Centre), whose monthly newsletter it is, but also discussing wider issue of the Esperanto-speaking community, is published regularly in Switzerland.

== See also ==
- Libera Folio
