= Esperanto in Japan =

International auxiliary language in Japan

The use of Esperanto in Japan (in Japanese: 日本のエスペラント) dates back to the 19th century.

== History ==
Esperantists briefly increased in Japan in the 1880s, along with the interest in the planned language Volapük. In 1906, after the Russo-Japanese War, the Japan Esperanto Association was founded by the anarchist Osugi Sakae. Early learners of Esperanto included Japanese novelist Futabatei Shimei, translator Ujaku Akita and anarchist Ōsugi Sakae.

An influential student group known as the Shinjinkai (新人会) hosted debates with fellow Korean and Chinese students in Esperanto, and the Baháʼí Faith mission headed by Vasili Eroshenko and Agnes Baldwin Alexander was influential in spreading Esperanto along with Christian missions. Esperanto chants were shouted during the visit of Indian Nobel Prize winner Rabindranath Tagore to Japan. The Japanese Esperanto Association was founded in 1919. Japan had its second boom in Esperanto from the 1920s to 1940s, with some Esperanto speakers in Japan beginning to publish their own Esperanto material. Esperanto was used by both left-wing and right-wing movements, but the left wing faced a significant decline in the 1930s.

== Oomoto ==
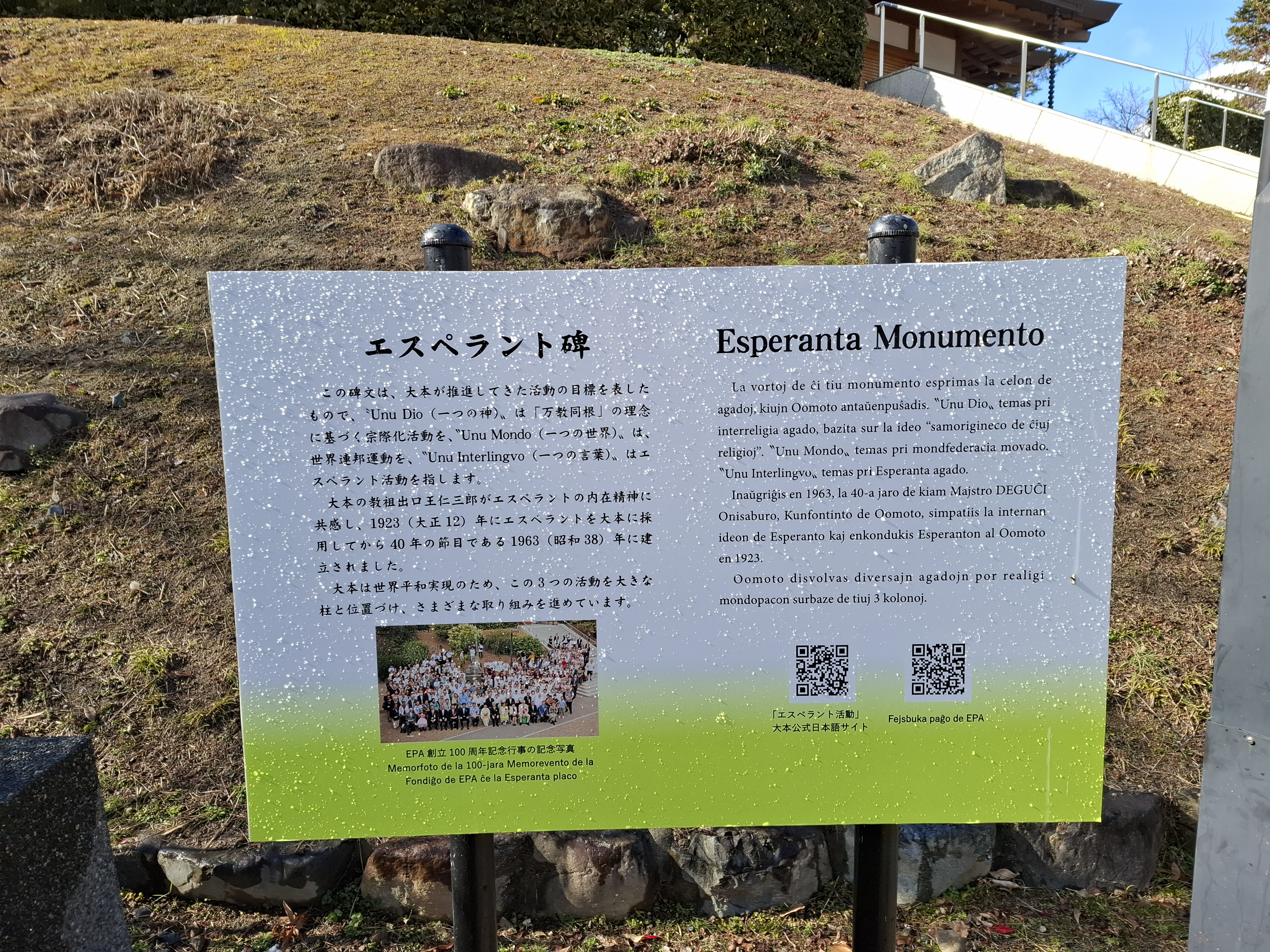
A bilingual Esperanto-Japanese sign introducing the Esperanta Monumento ("Esperanto Monument") at the Oomoto headquarters in Kameoka, Kyoto

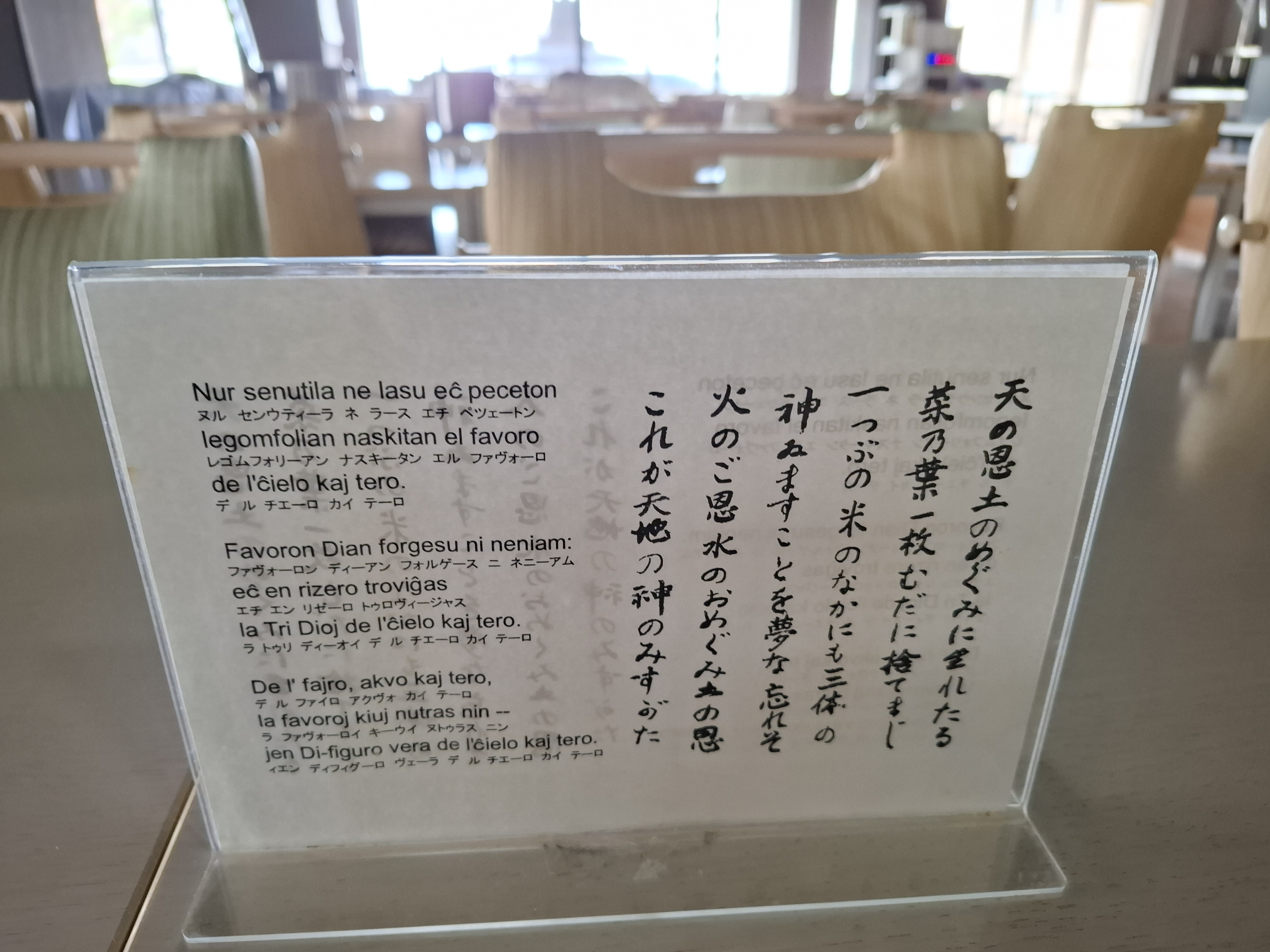
A bilingual Esperanto-Japanese prayer in appreciation of food at the Oomoto headquarters' cafeteria in Kameoka, Kyoto

Beginning in 1922, the Oomoto religion, under the guidance of its founder Onisaburo Deguchi started using Esperanto in order to present itself as a world religion and to promote interreligious dialogue. Many Oomoto facilities in Kameoka, Kyoto have multilingual signs in Japanese and Esperanto. Today, Oomoto continues to publish books, periodicals, pamphlets, and websites in Esperanto.

The Japanese Esperantist Shigeki Maeda actively translates Oomoto materials from Japanese to Esperanto, which are in turn translated from Esperanto to Portuguese and English.

== Bibliography ==
- Oomoto Overseas Department 海外宣伝課 (ed.) (1933). Kio estas Oomoto?. Kameoka: Tenseisha. doi:10.11501/1137286. (in Esperanto)
