= Summer Esperanto Study =

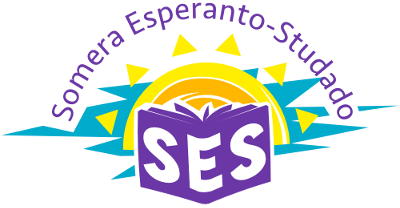
Logo of SES

Summer Esperanto Study (Esperanto: Somera Esperanto-Studado, SES) is the biggest annual international event aiming to teach Esperanto. It occurs every summer since 2007, lasts for a week and attracts up to 250 participants from 30 countries, being aimed both at beginners and fluent speakers of the language. The event is organised by E@I and usually takes places in Slovakia, with the exception of 2014 when it also occurred in Russia. It has been supported several times by the Slovak ministry of education and the local mayor. In its first year, the event had a narrower focus and was called Slavic Esperanto Study (Esperanto: Slava Esperanto-Studado).

== Programme ==
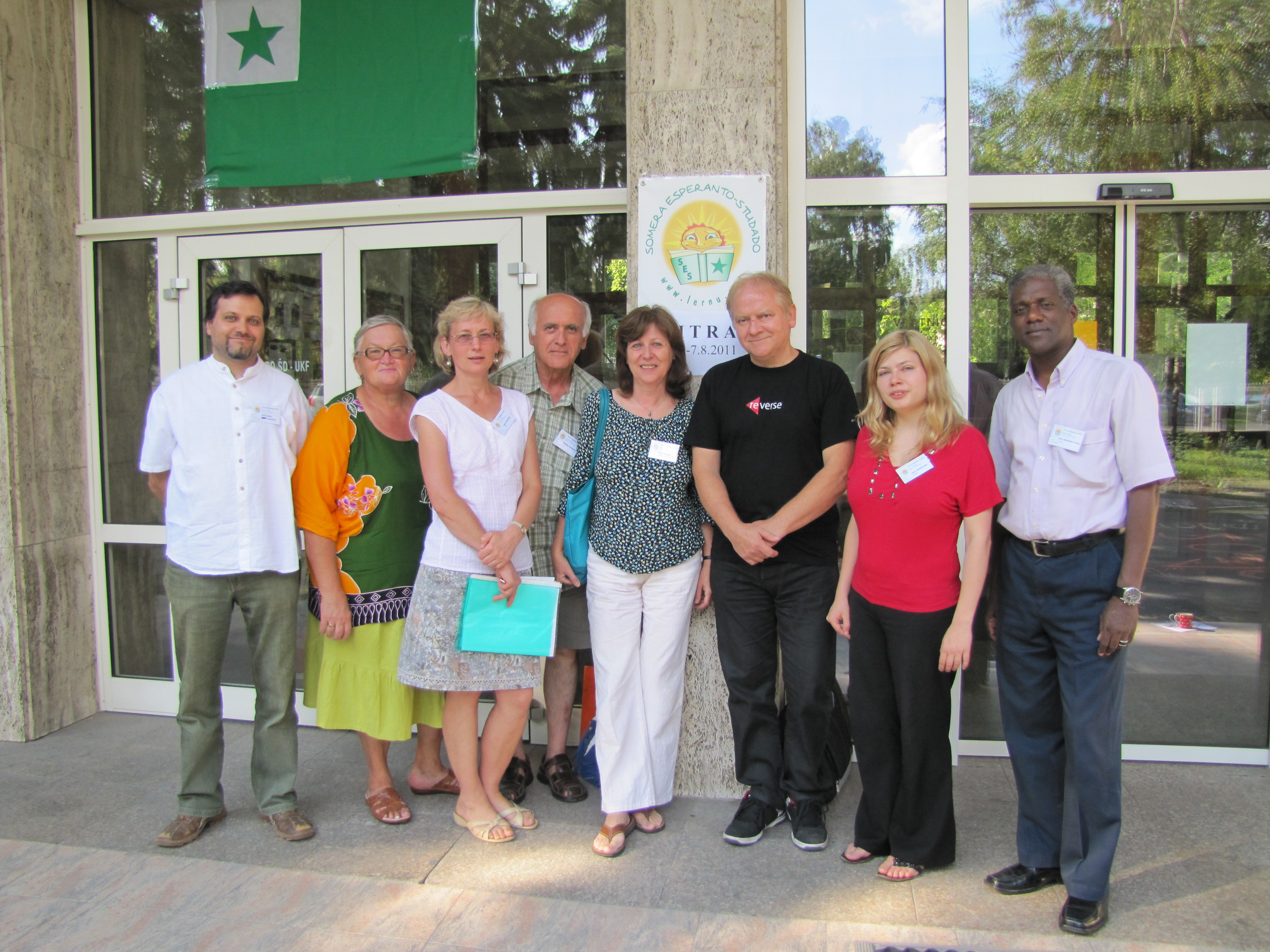
The teachers at SES 2011

The main aim of SES is to teach Esperanto and three hours are spent each morning in Esperanto classes at five different levels, ranging from CEFR level A1 to C1. During the afternoon, there are lectures, workshops and games. In the evening there are concerts and a bar; artists who have performed at SES include Kim Henriksen, JoMo and La Perdita Generacio. During the week, excursions to the surrounding area also occur. The teachers include renown Esperantists such as Bertilo Wennergren and Stano Marček.

== History ==
No.	Year	City	Country	Participants
15	2022	Kroměříž	Czechia	Did not occur
14	2020	Internet event		—
13	2019	Nitra	Slovakia	197
12	2018	Liptovský Mikuláš	Slovakia	258
11	2017	Banská Štiavnica	Slovakia	173
10	2015	Martin	Slovakia	190
9	2014	Koltyshevo	Russia	87
8	2014	Nitra	Slovakia	248
7	2013	Martin	Slovakia	230
6	2012	Nitra	Slovakia	250
5	2011	Nitra	Slovakia	191
4	2010	Piešťany	Slovakia	190
3	2009	Modra-Harmónia	Slovakia	90
2	2008	Modra-Harmónia	Slovakia	105
1	2007	Pribylina	Slovakia	50

=== 2014 ===
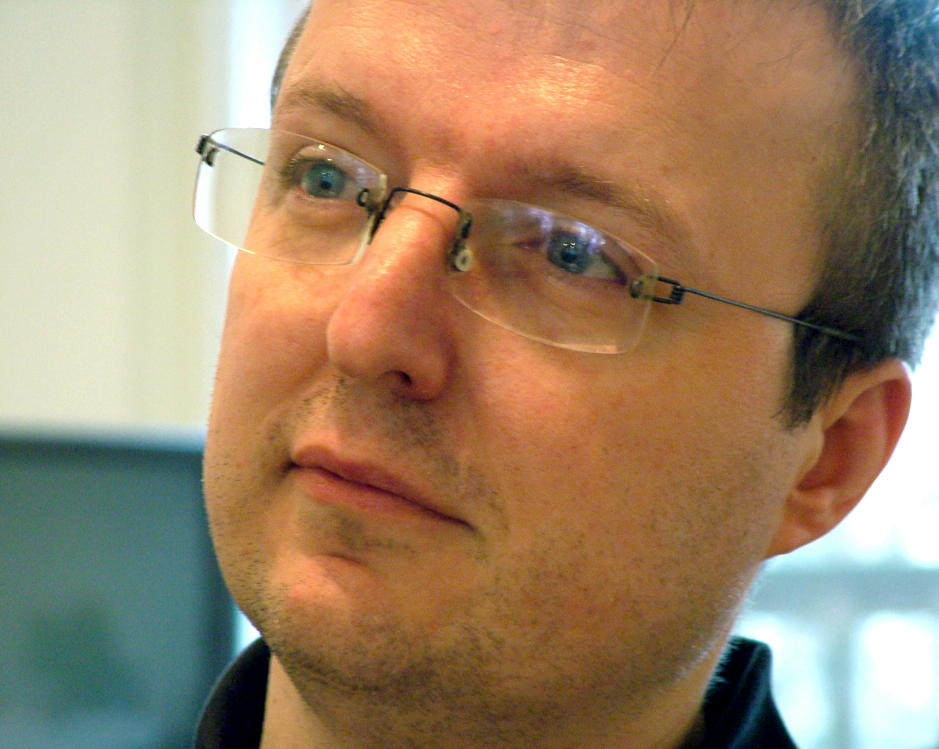
Jorge Camacho

In 2014, SES happened twice for the first time. Both events were supported by the World Esperanto Association and the World Esperanto Youth Organization. The first and bigger event took place from July 12 to July 20 in Nitra, Slovakia and was officially supported by the Slovak minister of education, Dušan Čaplovič, the president of Nitra Region, Milan Belica, and the mayor of Nitra, Jozef Dvonč. It was attended by 248 people from 28 countries. In addition to traditional Esperanto lessons, this edition of SES included for the first time a course of Esperanto literature and culture led by writers Jorge Camacho and Nicola Ruggiero.

From August 17 to August 25, a second SES took place for the first time outside of Slovakia, in Koltyshevo, Solnechnogorsky District, Moscow Oblast. 87 people from 10 countries attended the event that was co-organized by the Moscow Esperanto Association and the Russian Esperantist Union. In addition to Esperanto lessons, it included a translation course and a Russian language course.

=== 2015 ===
The tenth SES took place from August 11 to August 19 in Martin, Slovakia. It was supported by the Slovak minister of education, Juraj Draxler, the president of Žilina Region, Juraj Blanár, and the mayor of Martin, Andrej Hrnčiar.
