= Pekoteko =

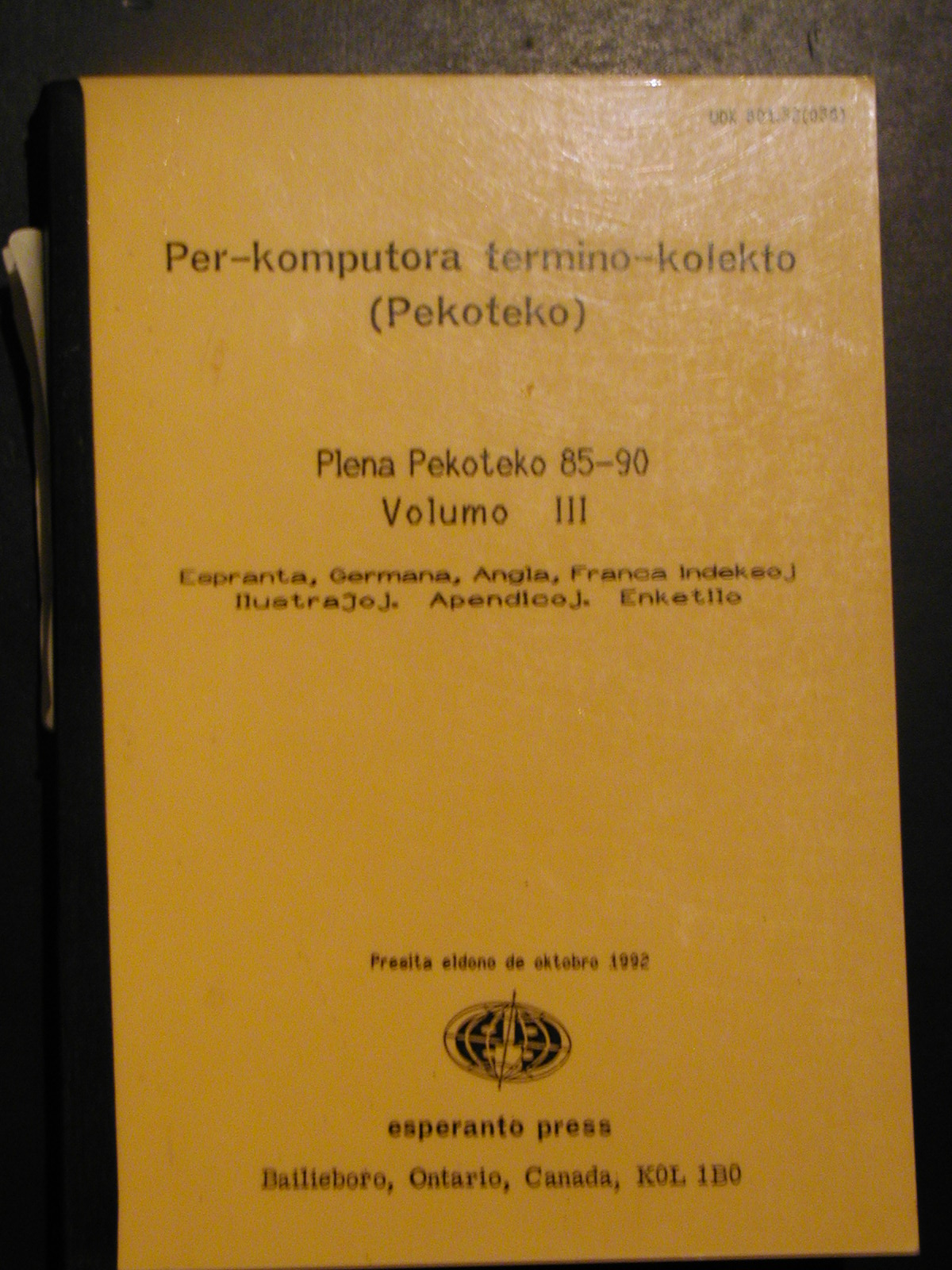
The third volume of La Plena Pekoteko, covering Esperanto, German, English and French indexes, as well as illustrations and appendixes

La Plena Pekoteko is a three-volume terminology collection extending to 1,816 pages. The word Pekoteko is an abbreviated version of Per-komputora termino-kolekto ("Computerized terminology collection").

== History ==
Rüdiger Eichholz, from 1976 a member of the Akademio de Esperanto, at that time headed the Academy's technical/specialized dictionaries section. Collaborating with other Esperantists from 1968 to 1981, he maintained the Slipara Vortaro, an indexed collection of word-definition slips. Later, during the personal computer era, he started working on the Pekoteko database project.

Other major contributors to this project were Bernhard Eichkorn, Bernhard Pabst and Edward Spitaels. Terminology proposals were collected between 1985 and 1990. In the foreword to the Pekoteko, Eichholz wrote: "We did not lose time in vain efforts to standardize the terms to be used for Esperanto. We simply offer them, and recommend to all readers who may require some [translated] terms, to consult our records, to read the arguments presented and to select those terms that, after reading the arguments, they judge most on-point."

In the Pekoteko the editors made a few suggestions; especially remarkable was the now-dead proposal to add the non-canonical suffix -apo for computer-related terms, such as the neologisms *desegn/apo, intended to mean "computer program for drawing" or *financ/ap/aro to mean "financial software suite"; neither term was actually adopted by the Esperanto community.

== Printing and distribution ==
The Pekoteko was printed in 1992 by the Canadian publishing house Esperanto Press after receiving financial support from the FAME Foundation established by Franz Alois Meiners. The project promoter distributed 150 copies as gifts to all members of the Academy of Esperanto, to the editorial staff of important Esperanto magazines and to a few libraries and museums. The remaining 150 units were sold.

Little is currently still heard about the Pekoteko. Nowadays the terminological work is accomplished quite differently, and the Pekoteko files are no longer directly usable. Some Esperantists, however, thought it was a great pity that the information contained therein was no longer readily available. It is possible that someone might now discuss correct terminology without knowing that the same discussion had already taken place 20 years earlier. In 2006, therefore, Bernhard Pabst converted the former WordPerfect files in his possession to a plain-text format, which he and André Weber then supplemented with additional entries. Pabst then converted the text file to PDF and made it available for download "to quickly and easily provide the public with information, not to recreate a perfect Pekoteko but only to provide basic control of the content."

The work of Pekoteko's creators inspired people such as Yves Nevelsteen, author of Vikipedio – praktika manlibro ("Wikipedia – a practical handbook") to create Komputeko a printed and on-line multilingual collection of computer terms. Numerous Esperanto words that first appeared in the Pekoteko are actually in use today to refer to computer hardware.
