= La Espero =

Poem by L. L. Zamenhof and unofficial anthem of Esperanto

English: The Hope
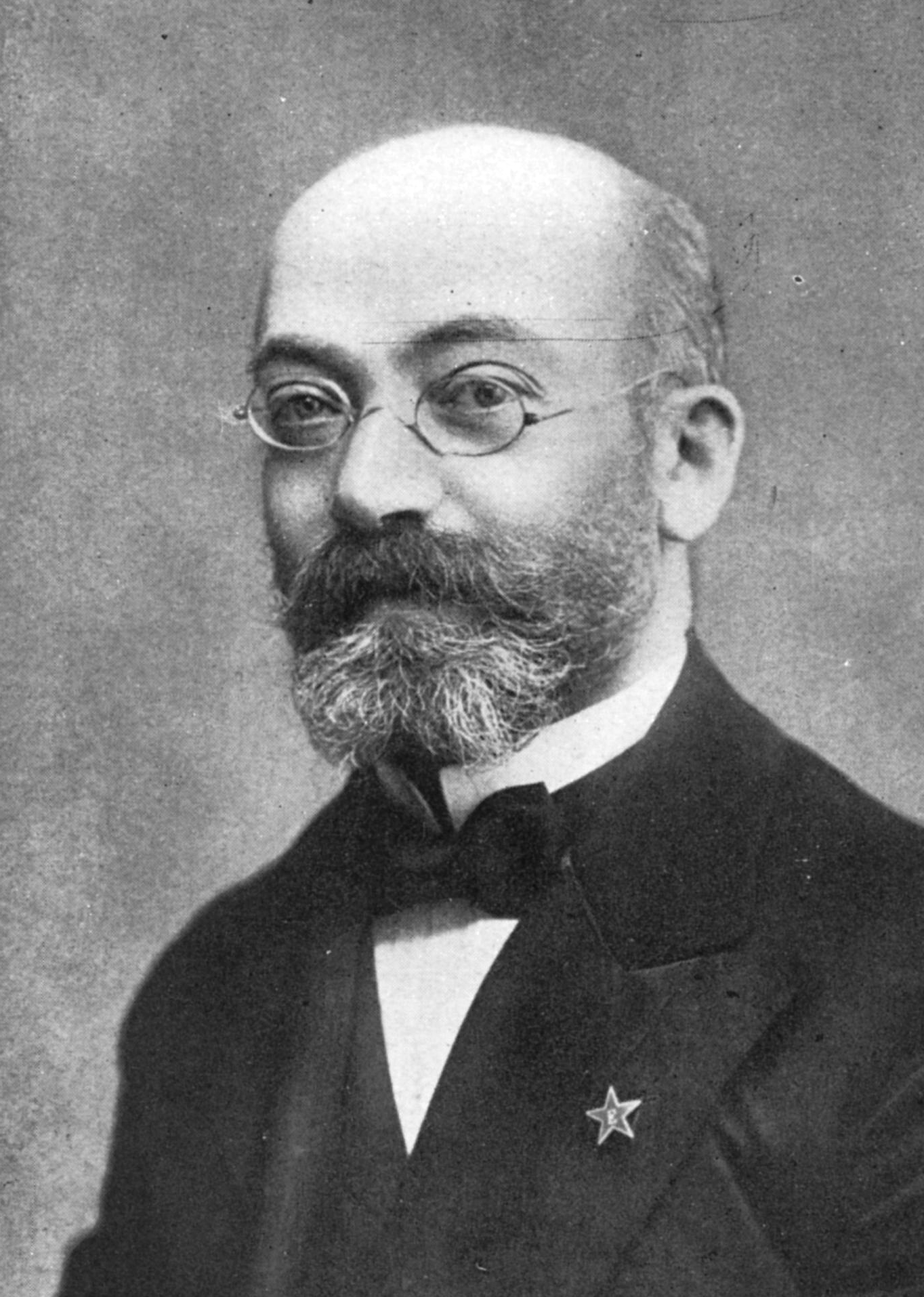
- L. L. Zamenhof, the author of La Espero.
- anthem of Esperanto
- Lyrics: L. L. Zamenhof
- Music: Félicien Menu de Ménil
- Adopted: 1891

Audio sample
- Instrumental recording: file; help

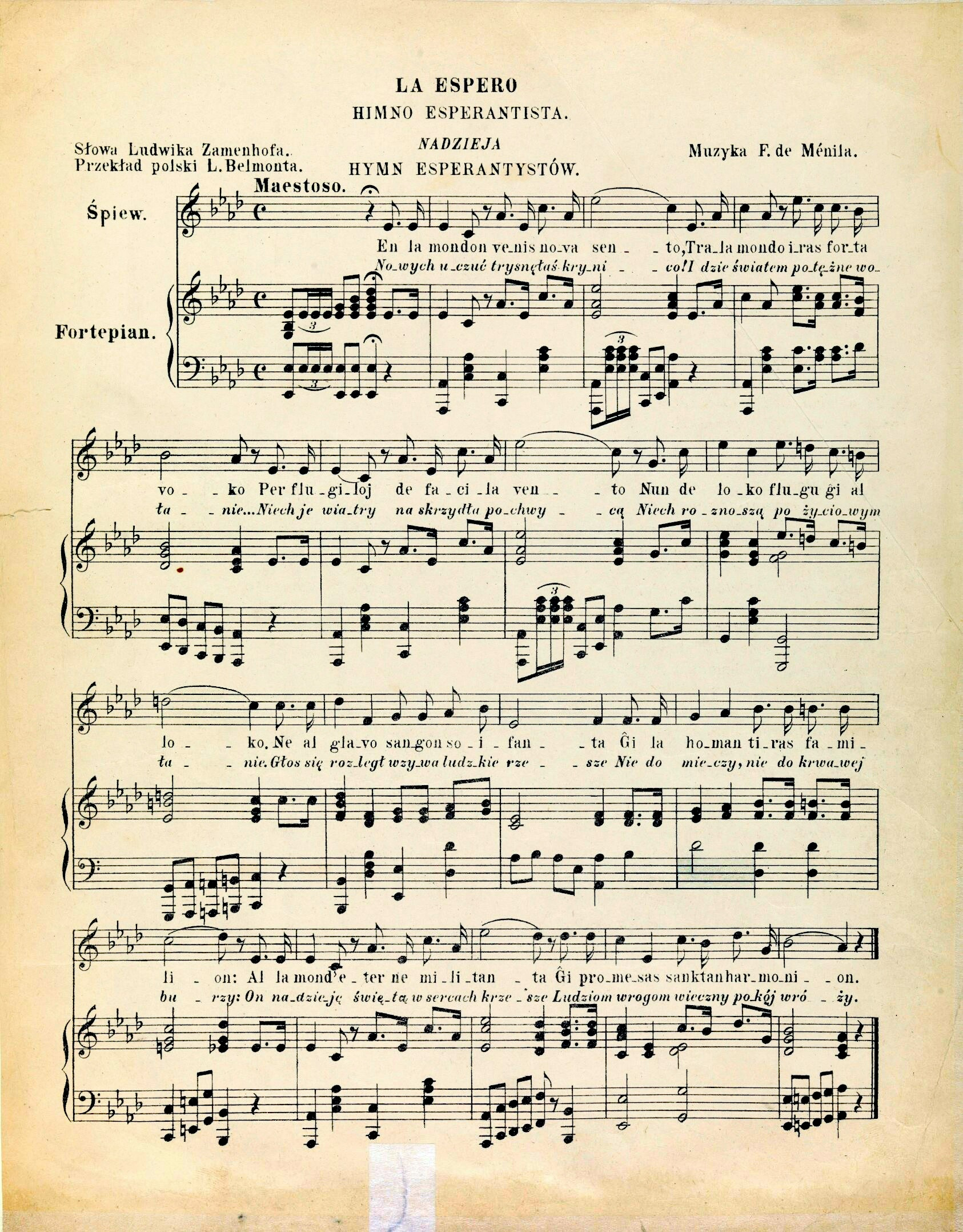
La Espero

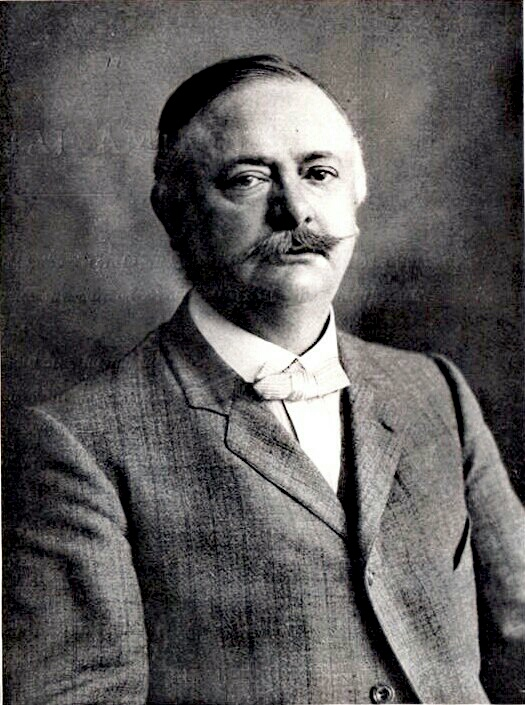
Félicien Menu de Ménil

"La Espero" (Esperanto pronunciation: [la esˈpero], English: "The Hope") is a poem written by Polish-Jewish doctor L. L. Zamenhof, the initiator of the Esperanto language. The song is often used as the (unofficial) anthem of Esperanto, and is now usually sung to a triumphal march composed by Félicien Menu de Ménil in 1909 (although there is an earlier, less martial tune created in 1891 by Claes Adelsköld, along with a number of other lesser-known tunes). It is sometimes referred to as the hymn of the Esperanto movement.

== Lyrics ==
La Espero

En la mondon venis nova sento,
tra la mondo iras forta voko;
per flugiloj de facila vento
nun de loko flugu ĝi al loko.

Ne al glavo sangon soifanta
ĝi la homan tiras familion:
al la mond' eterne militanta
ĝi promesas sanktan harmonion.

Sub la sankta signo de l' espero
kolektiĝas pacaj batalantoj,
kaj rapide kreskas la afero
per laboro de la esperantoj.

Forte staras muroj de miljaroj
inter la popoloj dividitaj;
sed dissaltos la obstinaj baroj,
per la sankta amo disbatitaj.

Sur neŭtrala lingva fundamento,
komprenante unu la alian,
la popoloj faros en konsento
unu grandan rondon familian.

Nia diligenta kolegaro
en laboro paca ne laciĝos,
ĝis la bela sonĝo de l' homaro
por eterna ben' efektiviĝos.

The Hope

Into the world came a new feeling,
through the world goes a powerful call;
by means of wings of a gentle wind
now let it fly from place to place.

Not to a bloodthirsty sword
does it draw the human family:
to the eternally fighting world
it promises sacred harmony.

Under the sacred sign of the hope
the peaceful fighters gather,
and this affair quickly grows
by the labours of those who hope.

Walls of millennia stand firmly
between the divided people;
but the stubborn barriers will jump apart,
knocked apart by the sacred love.

On a neutral language basis,
understanding one another,
the people will make in agreement
one great family circle.

Our diligent set of colleagues
in peaceful labor will never tire,
until the beautiful dream of humanity
for eternal blessing is realized.

== See also ==
- Esperanto music
- The Internationale
- Anthem of Europe
