= Esperanto Youth Week =

Esperanto Youth Week (Esperanto: Junulara E-Semajno, JES) is one of the most important Esperanto youth meetings in the world. It is organised by the German Esperanto Youth (GEJ) and the Polish Esperanto Youth (PEJ) at the end of every year in a different city of central Europe, starting 2009-10.

The meeting is taking the place of the former Internacia Seminario and Ago-Semajno, two Esperanto gatherings aimed at youth which had been overlapping since the beginning of the 2000s (decade); the former was organized by GEJ alone, while the latter was organized by the Polish Esperanto Youth and Varsovia Vento.

== List of weeks ==
Number	Dates	City	Country
11	27 December 2019-3 January 2020	Karłów	Poland
10	28 December 2018-4 January 2019	Storkow	Germany
9	26 December 2017-2 January 2018	Szczecin	Poland
8	28 December 2016-4 January 2017	Langwedel	Germany
7	27 December 2015-3 January 2016	Eger	Hungary
6	28 December 2014-4 January 2015	Weißwasser	Germany
5	28 December 2013-4 January 2014	Szczawno-Zdrój	Poland
4	28 December 2012-4 January 2013	Naumburg	Germany
3	27 December 2011-1 January 2012	Gdańsk	Poland
2	27 December 2010-2 January 2011	Burg	Germany
1	26 December 2009-3 January 2010	Zakopane	Poland
