= Canadian Esperanto Association =

Canadian charity

The Canadian Esperanto Association (Esperanto: Kanada Esperanto-Asocio, French: Association canadienne d'espéranto, KEA) is a registered educational charity whose objective is to advance the education of Esperanto among the Canadian public.

KEA's founding convention was held in 1958 in Toronto, Ontario, after a decision to create the organization was made by postal referendum among the known Canadian Esperantists in 1958. Its predecessor was an association of the same name founded in 1907 but voluntarily dissolved itself in 1939 in order not to distract its members from efforts towards winning World War II, which started in that year.

The Canadian Esperanto Association is the Canadian section of the Universala Esperanto-Asocio (UEA), and its youth section, Canadian Esperanto Youth (Junularo Esperantista Kanada, JEK), is the Canadian section of the World Esperanto Youth Organization.

KEA publishes a semi-annual magazine edited in Esperanto, Lumo (= light); its current editor is Camille-Amélie Marie-Madelaine Koziej Lévesque. It also occasionally publishes books in Esperanto. The organization's leadership consists of a president, vice-president, secretary, treasurer, and up to seven (currently, four) directors. Membership is about 120.

For many years, KEA held an annual convention (called a "congress" in accordance with Esperanto-movement usage), sometimes jointly with the Esperanto League for North America or during an international Esperanto congress, but with the arise of annual regional Esperanto conventions in both Western and Central Canada, the holding of national Canadian Esperanto conventions has become less frequent.

KEA was chosen to host to the 2020 World Esperanto Congress (Universala Kongreso, UK 2020) in Montreal, Quebec.
