= Monato =

Magazine in Esperanto

- Cover of the 2015 August–September issue
- Editor-in-Chief: Paŭl Peeraerts
- Frequency: Monthly
- Publisher: Flandra Esperanto-Ligo
- Founded: 1979
- Country: Belgium
- Based in: Antwerp
- Language: Esperanto
- Website: www.monato.be
- ISSN: 0772-456X

Monato is a monthly magazine produced in Esperanto which carries articles on politics, culture and economics. It is printed in Belgium and distributed to readers in 65 countries. The title simply means "month".

It has 100 correspondents in 45 countries and only prints articles originally written in Esperanto and not published elsewhere.

In style, content and appearance it could be likened to Time Magazine or Newsweek; however, a key difference is that its articles are produced by the residents of the country concerned, rather than by foreign correspondents.

== History ==
=== Semajno ===
In 1977 Stefan Maul was editor of the German newspaper Weltbild and received the task to develop Zenit, a new newspaper for the older generation. Although the project failed due to several independent factors from Maul, he became expert about the creation of a new publication, the testing of the market and other similar necessary steps. That gave strength to his old dream: to publish a weekly newspaper in Esperanto, not about Esperanto itself, but on general issues such as politics, economics, science and much more.

In 1978 Maul realized his dream. He printed a sample of Semajno ("week" in Esperanto), a 40-page number DIN A4-formed, black-white illustrated, with articles about terrorism, the Olympic games in Moscow in 1980, about the political situation in Spain, about gerontology and much more. This edition paid from his own pocket. He calculated that the project would succeed if Semajno had 10,000 subscribers, but he amounted less than 1,000 subscribers, and thus published no more editions past the first one.

=== Monato ===
Torben Kehlet, whose firm "TK / Stafeto" had already published many books and had its own printing press suggested publishing the magazine not weekly, but monthly. Maul was not sure it would be a good idea because in his opinion a monthly magazine can not be relevant. However, Kehlet managed to convince him. Instead of relevance, the magazine can offer in-depth analytical articles written by the residents of the countries in question.

In January 1980 the first issue of the magazine Monato was published by the firm "TK/Stafeto", which assumed financial risks. Torben Kehlet himself printed and distributed the magazine. The annual subscription (12 numbers) cost 800 Belgian francs, to pay for the project it needed 2000 subscribers.

Stefan Maul became the editor-in-chief of Monato; he assembled a group of competent employees (Maria Becker-Meisberger, Marjorie Bolton, Margret Brandenburg, Eugène de Zila, Bernard Golden, Trevor Steel, Eduard Symoens, etc.). At the end of the first year, Monato conducted a survey among readers. It turned out that 28% read the magazine in full and 60% read the most.

Due to some difficulties of "TK/Stafeto", UEA took over the publication of Monato and was ready at its own expense to provide subscribers with the remaining numbers of 1984, and from 1985 to publish a magazine. In the doubled number 5/6 for 1984 there was an announcement Monato continues to live". In the same issue, several pages were devoted to readers' reactions to the alleged death of the magazine.

In the mid-1980s, UEA opened offices not only in Antwerp, but also in Budapest and New York. However, in 1988 the association began to close additional offices. The director of the Antwerp graphic center, Paŭl Peeraerts, was informed that all employees will be dismissed and the office closed. Since the graphic center carried out the administration and publication of Monato, closing the office would also mean closing the magazine, because there was no money for printing and printing the magazine in another firm.

However, the existence of the Antwerp graphic center had strengthened the local Esperanto movement in Flanders. Negotiations ensued between the UEA and the Flanders League of Esperanto, and soon after the FLE took over the equipment and the team, namely Guido Baeyens, Hugo Fontyn, Gerd Jacques, Paŭl Peeraerts, Guido van Damme and Jean-Pierre VandenDaele. Since then the Monato has been continuously published by the Flanders Esperanto League.
