= History of Esperanto =

An Esperanto speaker, recorded in the United States.

L. L. Zamenhof developed Esperanto in the 1870s and '80s. Unua Libro, the first print discussion of the language, appeared in 1887. The number of Esperanto speakers have increased gradually since then, without much support from governments and international organizations. Its use has, in some instances, been outlawed or otherwise suppressed.

== Standardized Yiddish ==
Around 1880, while in Moscow and approximately simultaneously with working on Esperanto, Zamenhof made an aborted attempt to standardize Yiddish, based on his native Bialystok (Northeastern) dialect, as a unifying language for the Jews of the Russian Empire. He even used a Latin alphabet, with the letters ć, h́, ś, ź (the same as in early drafts of Esperanto, later ĉ, ĥ, ŝ, ĵ) and ě for schwa. However, he concluded there was no future for such a project, and abandoned it, dedicating himself to Esperanto as a unifying language for all humankind. Paul Wexler proposed that Esperanto was not an arbitrary pastiche of major European languages but a Latinate relexification of Yiddish, a native language of its founder. This model is generally unsupported by mainstream linguists.

== Development of the language before publication ==
Zamenhof would later say that he had dreamed of a world language since he was a child. At first he considered a revival of Latin, but after learning it in school he decided it was too complicated to be a common means of international communication. When he learned English, he realised that verb conjugations were unnecessary, and that grammatical systems could be much simpler than he had expected. He still had the problem of memorising a large vocabulary, until he noticed two Russian signs labelled Швейцарская (švejtsarskaja, a porter's lodge – from швейцар švejtsar, a porter) and Кондитерская (konditerskaja, a confectioner's shop – from кондитер konditer, a confectioner). He then realised that a judicious use of affixes could greatly decrease the number of root words needed for communication. He chose to take his vocabulary from Romance and Germanic, the languages that were most widely taught in schools around the world and would therefore be recognisable to the largest number of people.

Zamenhof taught an early version of the language to his high-school classmates. Then, for several years, he worked on translations and poetry to refine his creation. In 1895 he wrote, "I worked for six years perfecting and testing the language, even though it had seemed to me in 1878 that it was already completely ready." When he was ready to publish, the Czarist censors would not allow it. Stymied, he spent his time in translating works such as the Bible and Shakespeare. This enforced delay led to continued improvement. In July 1887 he published his Unua Libro (First Book), a basic introduction to the language. This was essentially the language spoken today.

== Unua Libro to Declaration of Boulogne (1887–1905) ==
Unua Libro was published in 1887. At first the movement grew most in the Russian empire and eastern Europe, but soon spread to western Europe and beyond: to Argentina in 1889; to Canada in 1901; to Algeria, Chile, Japan, Mexico, and Peru in 1903; to Tunisia in 1904; and to Australia, the United States, Guinea, Indochina, New Zealand, Tonkin, and Uruguay in 1905.

In its first years Esperanto was used mainly in publications by Zamenhof and early adopters like Antoni Grabowski, in extensive correspondence (mostly now lost), in the magazine La Esperantisto, published from 1889 to 1895 and only occasionally in personal encounters.

In 1894, under pressure from Wilhelm Trompeter, the publisher of the magazine La Esperantisto, and some other leading users, Zamenhof reluctantly put forward a radical reform to be voted on by readers. He proposed the reduction of the alphabet to 22 letters (by eliminating the accented letters and most of their sounds), the change of the plural to -i, the use of a positional accusative instead of the ending -n, the removal of the distinction between adjectives and adverbs, the reduction of the number of participles from six to two, and the replacement of the table of correlatives with more Latinate words or phrases. These reforms were overwhelmingly rejected, but some were picked up in subsequent reforms (such as Ido) and criticisms of the language. In the following decade Esperanto spread into western Europe, especially France. By 1905 there were already 27 magazines being published (Auld 1988).

A small international conference was held in 1904, leading to the first world congress in August 1905 in Boulogne-sur-Mer, France. There were 688 Esperanto speakers present from 20 nationalities. At this congress, Zamenhof officially resigned his leadership of the Esperanto movement, as he did not want personal prejudice against himself (or anti-Semitism) to hinder the progress of the language. He proposed a declaration on founding principles of the Esperanto movement, which the attendees of the congress endorsed.

== Declaration of Boulogne to present (1905–present) ==
The World Esperanto Congress has been held every year since 1905, except during the two world wars and the COVID-19 pandemic.

The autonomous territory of Neutral Moresnet, between Belgium and Germany, had a sizable proportion of Esperanto-speakers among its small and multiethnic population. There was a proposal to make Esperanto its official language. In 1908, it was eventually accepted alongside Dutch, German, and French. There was also a large Esperanto group led by Anna Tuschinski in the Free City of Danzig.

In the early 1920s, a great opportunity seemed to arise for Esperanto when the Iranian delegation to the League of Nations proposed that it be adopted for use in international relations, following a report by Nitobe Inazō, an official delegate of League of Nations during the 13th World Congress of Esperanto in Prague. Ten delegates accepted the proposal with only one voice against, the French delegate, Gabriel Hanotaux, who employed France's Council veto privilege to squash all League attempts at the recognition of Esperanto, starting on the first vote on 18 December 1920 and continuing through the next three years. Hanotaux did not like how the French language was losing its position as the international language and saw Esperanto as a threat. However, two years later the League recommended that its member states include Esperanto in their educational curricula. The French retaliated by banning all instruction in Esperanto in French schools and universities. The French Ministry of Instruction said that acceptance of Esperanto would mean that "French and English would perish and that the literary standard of the world would be debased". Nonetheless, many people see the 1920s as the heyday of the Esperanto movement.

In 1941, the Soviet Union started performing mass arrests, deportations, and killings of many Esperantists and their relatives for fear of an anti-nationalistic movement, but it was interrupted by the Nazi invasion.

Hitler wrote in Mein Kampf that Esperanto was created as a universal language to unite the Jewish diaspora.

The creation of a Jew-free National German Esperanto League was not enough to placate the Nazis. The teaching of Esperanto was not allowed in German prisoner-of-war camps during World War II. Esperantists sometimes were able to get around the ban by convincing guards that they were teaching Italian, the language of Germany's closest ally.

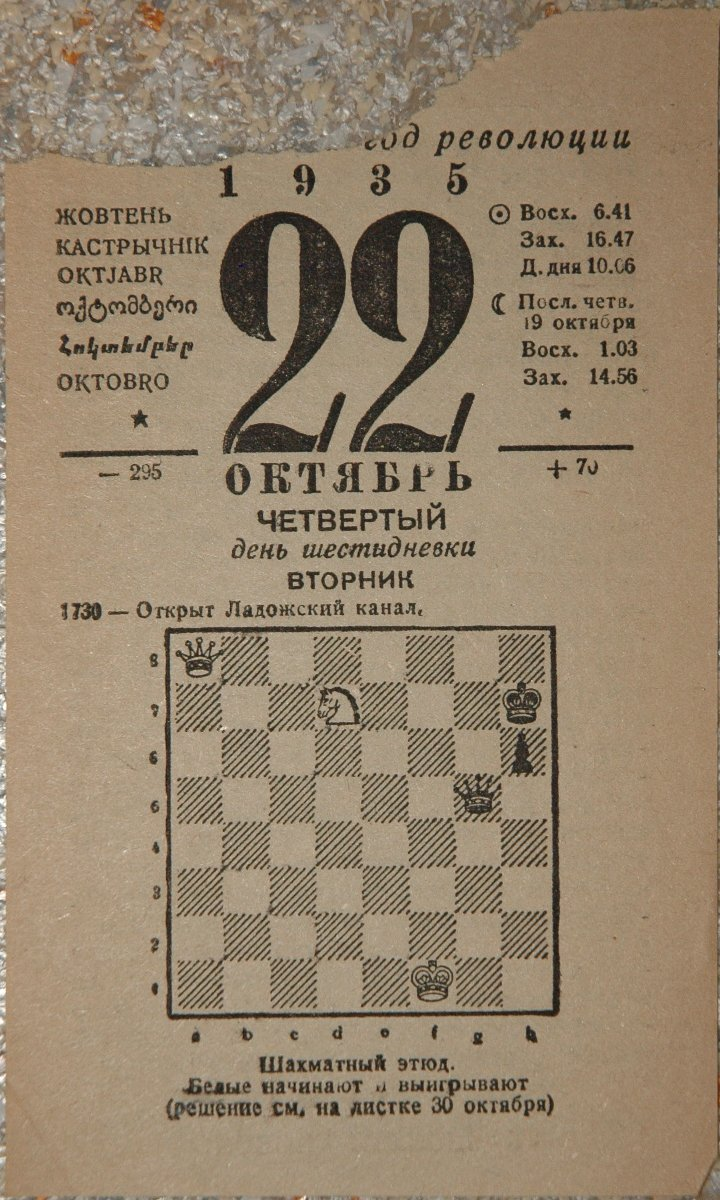
A Soviet calendar page for 22 October 1935 including the Esperanto oktobro among other translations.

In the early years of the Soviet Union, Esperanto was given a measure of government support, and an officially recognized Soviet Esperanto Association came into being. However, in 1937, Stalin reversed this policy and the use of Esperanto was effectively banned until 1956. While Esperanto itself was not enough cause for execution, its use was extended among Jews or trade unionists and encouraged contacts with foreigners.

Fascist Italy, on the other hand, made some efforts of promoting tourism in Italy through Esperanto leaflets and appreciated the similarities of Italian and Esperanto.

Portugal's right-wing governments cracked down on the language from 1936 until they were deposed in the Carnation Revolution of 1974. After the Spanish Civil War, Francoist Spain cracked down on the Anarchists and Catalan nationalists among whom the speaking of Esperanto had been quite widespread; but in the 1950s, the Esperanto movement was tolerated again, with Francisco Franco accepting the honorary patronage of the Madrid World Esperanto Congress.

The Cold War, especially in the 1950s and 1960s, put a damper on the Esperanto movement as well, as there were fears on both sides that Esperanto could be used for enemy propaganda. However, the language experienced something of a renaissance in the 1970s and spread to new parts of the world, such as its veritable explosion in popularity in Iran in 1975. By 1991 there were enough African Esperantists to warrant a pan-African congress. The language continues to spread, although it is not officially recognised by any country, and is part of the state educational curriculum of only a few.

In 2022 an Esperanto club was founded on the Amundsen–Scott South Pole Station making Antarctica the last continent with organized Esperantists.

== Evolution of the language ==
The Declaration of Boulogne (1905) limited changes to Esperanto. That declaration stated, among other things, that the basis of the language should remain the Fundamento de Esperanto ("Foundation of Esperanto", a group of early works by Zamenhof), which is to be binding forever: nobody has the right to make changes to it. The declaration also permits new concepts to be expressed as the speaker sees fit, but it recommends doing so in accordance with the original style.

Many Esperantists believe this declaration stabilising the language is a major reason why the Esperanto speaker community grew beyond the levels attained by other constructed languages and has developed a flourishing culture. Other constructed languages have been hindered from developing a stable speaking community by continual tinkering. Also, many developers of constructed languages have been possessive of their creation and have worked to prevent others from contributing to the language. One such ultimately disastrous case was Schleyer's Volapük. In contrast, Zamenhof declared that "Esperanto belongs to the Esperantists", and moved to the background once the language was published, allowing others to share in the early development of the language.

The grammatical description in the earliest books was somewhat vague, so a consensus on usage (influenced by Zamenhof's answers to some questions) developed over time within boundaries set by the initial outline (Auld 1988). Even before the Declaration of Boulogne, the language was remarkably stable; only one set of lexical changes were made in the first year after publication, namely changing "when", "then", "never", "sometimes", "always" from kian, tian, nenian, ian, ĉian to kiam, tiam, neniam etc., to avoid confusion with the accusative forms of kia "what sort of", tia "that sort of", etc. Thus Esperanto achieved a stability of structure and grammar similar to that which natural languages enjoy by virtue of their native speakers and established bodies of literature. One could learn Esperanto without having it move from underfoot. Changes could and did occur in the language, but only by acquiring widespread popular support; there was no central authority making arbitrary changes, as happened with Volapük and some other languages.

Modern Esperanto usage may in fact depart from that originally described in the Fundamento, though the differences are largely semantic (involving changed meaning of words) rather than grammatical or phonological. The translation given for "I like this one", in the sample phrases in the main Esperanto article, offers a significant example. According to the Fundamento, Mi ŝatas ĉi tiun would in fact have meant "I esteem this one". The traditional usage is Tiu ĉi plaĉas al mi (literally, "this one is pleasing to me"), which reflects the phrasing of most European languages (French celui-ci me plaît, Spanish éste me gusta, Russian это мне нравится [eto mnye nravitsya], German Das gefällt mir, Italian mi piace). However, the original Ĉi tiu plaĉas al mi continues to be commonly used.

For later changes to the language, see Modern evolution of Esperanto.

== Dialects, reform projects and derived languages ==
Esperanto has not fragmented into regional dialects through natural language use. This may be because it is the language of daily communication for only a small minority of its speakers. However at least three other factors work against dialects, namely the centripetal force of the Fundamento, the unifying influence of the Plena Vortaro and its successors, which exemplified usage from the works of Zamenhof and leading writers, and the transnational ambitions of the speech community itself. Slang and jargon have developed to some extent, but such features interfere with universal communication – the whole point of Esperanto – and so have generally been avoided.

However, in the early twentieth century numerous reform projects were proposed. Almost all of these Esperantidos were stillborn, but the very first, Ido ("offspring"), had significant success for several years. Ido was proposed by the Delegation for the Adoption of an International Auxiliary Language in Paris in October 1907. Its main reforms were in bringing the alphabet, semantics, and some grammatical features into closer alignment with the Romance languages, as well as removal of adjectival agreement and the accusative case except when necessary. At first, a number of leading Esperantists put their support behind the Ido project, but the movement stagnated and declined, first with the accidental death of one of its main proponents and later as people proposed further changes, and the number of current speakers is estimated at between 250 and 5,000. However, Ido has proven to be a rich source of Esperanto vocabulary.

Some more focused reform projects, affecting only a particular feature of the language, have gained a few adherents. One of these is riism, which modifies the language to incorporate non-sexist language and gender-neutral pronouns. However, most of these projects are specific to individual nationalities (riism from English speakers, for example), and the only changes that have gained acceptance in the Esperanto community have been the minor and gradual bottom-up reforms discussed in the last section.

Esperanto is credited with influencing or inspiring several later competing language projects, such as Occidental (1922) and Novial (1928). These always lagged far behind Esperanto in their popularity. By contrast, Interlingua (1951) has greatly surpassed Ido in terms of popularity. It shows little or no Esperanto influence, however.

== Timeline of Esperanto ==
- 1859: L. L. Zamenhof, the creator of Esperanto, is born in Białystok, Russia (now Poland).
- 1873: The Zamenhof family moves to Warsaw.
- 1878: Zamenhof celebrates the completion of his universal language project, Lingwe Uniwersala, with high school friends.
- 1879: Zamenhof attends medical school in Moscow. His father burns his language project while he's away. Meanwhile Schleyer publishes a sketch of Volapük, the first constructed international auxiliary language to acquire a number of speakers. Many Volapük clubs will later switch to Esperanto.
- 1881: Zamenhof returns to Warsaw to continue medical school, and starts to recreate his project.
- 1887: Zamenhof marries. In July, with his wife's financial help, he publishes Unua Libro, the first publication introducing Esperanto, in Russian. Polish, German, and French translations are published later that year.
- 1888: Leo Tolstoy becomes an early supporter. Zamenhof publishes Dua Libro, as well as the first English-language edition of Unua Libro, which proved to be filled with errors.
- 1889: The second English-language edition of Unua Libro is published in January, translated by Richard H. Geoghegan, and becomes the standard English translation. Henry Phillips Jr., of the American Philosophical Society, also translates Unua Libro into English. The first volume of La Esperantisto is published in September. The language begins to be called Esperanto.
- 1894: Zamenhof, reacting to pressure, puts a radical reform to a vote, but it is overwhelmingly rejected. That version of Esperanto is often referred to as Esperanto 1894.
- 1895: La Esperantisto ceases publication. Lingvo Internacia begins publication in December.
- 1901: Zamenhof publishes his ideas on a universal religion, based on the philosophy of Hillel the Elder.
- 1905: Fundamento de Esperanto is published in the spring. The first World Esperanto Congress is held in Boulogne-sur-Mer, with 688 participants and conducted entirely in Esperanto. The Declaration of Boulogne is drafted and ratified at the congress.
- 1906: The second World Esperanto Congress is held in Geneva, Switzerland, drawing 1200 participants. La Revuo begins publication.
- 1907: Twelve members of the British parliament nominate Zamenhof for the Nobel Peace Prize. The Ĉekbanko Esperantista (Esperantist Checking Bank) is founded in London, using the spesmilo, an auxiliary Esperanto currency based on the gold standard. A committee organised by Louis Couturat in Paris proposes the Ido reform project, which provides significant competition for Esperanto until the First World War.
- 1908: The Universal Esperanto Association is founded by Hector Hodler, a 19-year-old Swiss Esperantist.
- 1909: The International Association of Esperantist Railway Workers is founded in Barcelona.
- 1910s: Esperanto is taught in state schools in the Republic of China, Samos, and Macedonia.
- 1910: 42 members of the French parliament nominate Zamenhof for the Nobel Peace Prize.
- 1914: Lingvo Internacia and La Revuo cease publication.
- 1917: Zamenhof dies during World War I.
- 1920: The first Esperanto magazine for the blind, Aŭroro, begins publishing in then-Czechoslovakia. It's still in print today.
- 1921: The French Academy of the Sciences recommends using Esperanto for international scientific communication.
- 1922: Esperanto is banned from French schools.
- 1924: The League of Nations recommends that member states implement Esperanto as an auxiliary language.
- 1920s: Offices of the Brazilian Ministry of Education use Esperanto for their international correspondence. Lu Xun, the founder of modern Chinese literature, becomes a supporter of Esperanto. Montagu C. Butler is the first to raise Esperanto-speaking children.
- 1933/34: Reorganisation of the international (neutral) Esperanto movement, under the name UEA.
- 1934: Encyclopedia of Esperanto first published in Budapest.
- 1935: Kalocsay and Waringhien publish the influential Plena Gramatiko de Esperanto (Complete Grammar of Esperanto). Esperanto and other planned languages de facto prohibited in Nazi Germany in May.
- 1936: All Esperanto organisations in Nazi Germany prohibited in June through the prohibition of the UEA and SAT in June by Heinrich Himmler.
- 1937: Leaders of the Esperanto organisation in the Soviet Union arrested; Esperanto activities made impossible.
- 1938: The World Esperanto Youth Organisation TEJO is founded.
- 1939–1945: In World War II many countries are occupied by Germany and the Soviet Union, where Esperanto organisations often were prohibited or Esperanto activities were limited in other ways.
- 1948: The railway workers' association is refounded as IFEF, the Internacia Fervojista Esperanto-Federacio (International Railway Workers' Esperanto Federation) to foster the use of Esperanto in the administration of the railroads of the world (so far, of Eurasia).
- 1954: UNESCO establishes consultative relations with the Universal Esperanto Association.
- 1966: The precursor to Pasporta Servo is launched in Argentina. Pasporta Servo is a global network of Esperanto speakers who host Esperantists traveling through their countries.
- 1967: István Nemere founds the Renkontiĝo de Esperanto-Familioj, the first organisation for Esperanto-speaking families.
- 1975: The Esperanto movement spreads to Iran, with three thousand learning the language in Tehran.
- 1980: The Internacia Junulara Kongreso (International Youth Congress) in Rauma, Finland ratify the Manifesto of Rauma, articulating the view of many in the Esperanto movement that Esperanto is a goal in itself.
- 1985: UNESCO encourages UN member states to add Esperanto to their school curricula.
- 1987: 6000 Esperantists attend the 72nd World Esperanto Congress in Warsaw, marking Esperanto's centennial.
- 1991: The first pan-African Esperanto Conference is held in Lomé, Togo.
- 1992: PEN International accepts an Esperanto section.
- 1999: The Esperanto poet William Auld is nominated for the Nobel Prize in Literature.
- 2001: The Vikipedio project (Esperanto Wikipedia) is launched, resulting in the first general encyclopedia written in a constructed language. It is now one of the most popular websites in Esperanto.
- 2004: The Europe–Democracy–Esperanto party (E°D°E°) contests the European Parliament elections in France, on a platform of making Esperanto the second language of all EU member states, taking 0.15% of the vote.
- 2007: Israel issues a stamp to commemorate 120 years of Esperanto (1887–2007). An image of Zamenhof is designed in a text describing his life, reproduced from the Wikipedia article on Esperanto. The corner of the tab shows the flag of the Esperanto movement.
- 2009: The Senate of Brazil passed a bill which would make Esperanto an optional part of the curriculum in its state schools. As of 2010 the bill has not yet been passed by the Chamber of Deputies.
- 2015: The 100th World Esperanto Congress is held in Lille, France. Duolingo launches its Esperanto program.
- 2017: Amikumu is launched, an app connecting Esperantists with other local Esperantists throughout the world.

== Bibliography ==
- Auld, William. La Fenomeno Esperanto. Rotterdam: UEA, 1988.
- Dijk, Ziko van. Historio de UEA. Partizánske: Espero, 2012.
- Forster, Peter Glover. The Esperanto Movement. Den Haag et al. 1982 (Hull 1977).
- Gobbo, Federico. Is It Possible for All People to Speak the Same Language? The Story of Ludwik Zamenhof and Esperanto (PDF).
- König, Malte. Esperanto. In: 1914-1918-online. International Encyclopedia of the First World War, ed. by Ute Daniel, Peter Gatrell, Oliver Janz, Heather Jones, Jennifer Keene, Alan Kramer, and Bill Nasson, issued by Freie Universität Berlin, Berlin 2024-02-05.
- Korĵenkov, Aleksander. Historio de Esperanto. Kaliningrad 2005.
- Lins, Ulrich. La Danĝera Lingvo. Gerlingen, Germany: Bleicher Eldonejo, 1988. (Also available in Polish)
