= Esperanto Day =

Commemoration in Esperanto culture

Esperanto Day (Esperanto: Esperanto-Tago) is a worldwide observance on 26 July, which celebrates the publication of Unua Libro, the first book in the Esperanto language, by the language's creator, L. L. Zamenhof on this day in 1887. According to the Universal Esperanto Association, Esperanto Day is "a day of linguistic justice and therefore of just and fair relations among ethnic groups, cultures, and peoples". As Esperanto is a constructed language with a specific date of inception, enthusiasts and speakers of the language celebrate it on this day, and also celebrate the ideas often associated with Esperanto, such as international cooperation and brotherhood, and the breaching of cultural divides.

The annual multi-day World Esperanto Congress is held around this time.

== Background ==
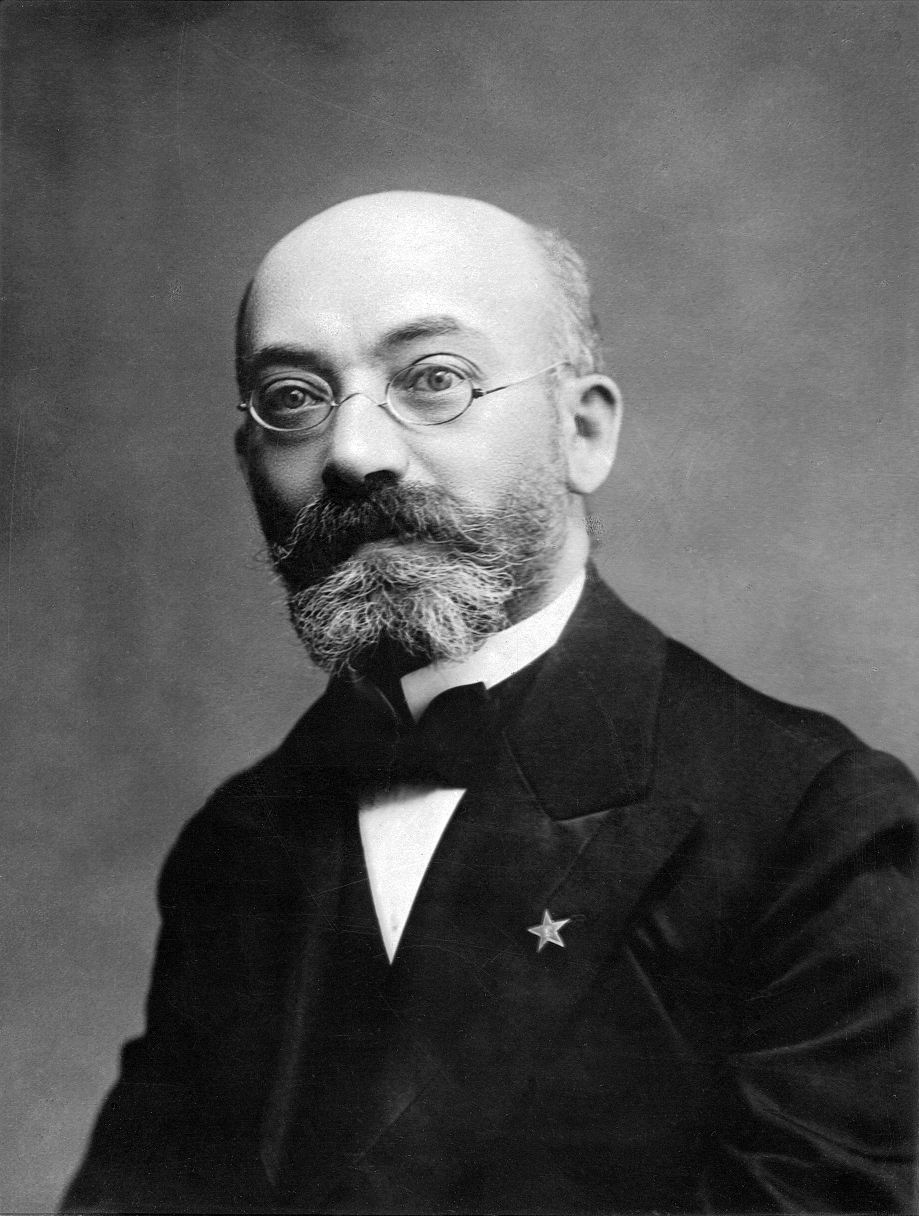
L. L. Zamenhof, Polish ophthalmologist and creator of Esperanto.

After many years of developing the language, Zamenhof completed Unua Libro by the spring of 1885 and spent the next two years looking for a publisher. In 1887, shortly after he married his wife Klara, his new father-in-law Aleksandr Silbernik advised him to use money from Klara's dowry to find a publisher. Following his advice, Zamenhof found a publisher in Warsaw, Chaim Kelter. On July 26 [O.S. July 14] 1887, Kelter published the book in Russian as International Language (Russian: Международный язык). Before the end of the year, Kelter published the Polish, French, and German editions of the book, as well.

The book is considered the founding document for the language and movement, which came to be known as "Esperanto", (meaning "hoper" or "one who hopes", after Zamenhof's pseudonym) as it laid out the fundamental grammar and vocabulary of the language. In 1905, Zamenhof reproduced much of the content of Unua Libro in Fundamento de Esperanto, which he established as the only obligatory authority over Esperanto in the Declaration of Boulogne at the first World Esperanto Congress in August of that year. The congress continued to be held in late July and early August thereafter to mark anniversaries of the release of Unua Libro.

The Esperanto Congresses continue to be held to this day at this time of year, and the Universal Esperanto Association has recognised the day. The day is sometimes proposed together with the International Mother Language Day (February 21) by the UEA, because Esperanto has developed into a language with native speakers.

In a message from the Universal Esperanto Association (UEA) on the occasion of Esperanto Day in July 2024, it emphasized, among other things, that

- Esperanto was created "so that everyone in the world can speak their own language" and "so that all languages can live, and that dialogue between different language groups can take place without pressure from one another, but in an equal manner, without discrimination."
- "Linguistic discrimination is often unrecognized by those who discriminate and even by those who are discriminated against."

On that day (or another suitable weekday around it) Esperanto speakers around the world hold special gatherings to celebrate the occasion. The ideology of Esperanto and the proximity of Zamenhof Day to Christmas encourage those gathered to exchange gifts (preferably books written in Esperanto) and good wishes. Sometimes lectures about LL Zamenhof also take place during such gatherings.

== Observance ==
Esperanto day is just a few days from Friendship Day (July 30), and since many of the common ideals of Esperantists such as international brotherhood, an emphasis on human rights in public policy-making and cooperation between different nations have overlap with the ideas of fellowship across cultural divides associated with Friendship Day, they are often celebrated in similar ways. In addition to celebrating the creation of the constructed language, since Esperanto commonly has ideology attached to it, Esperanto day is also observed by general calls for cooperation between countries.

The Linguistic Rights organisation described Esperanto Day as a "day of linguistic justice" and "of just and fair relations among ethnic groups, cultures, and peoples". Since English has become the de facto Lingua Franca, Esperanto is proposed as an alternative without the perceived colonial baggage of the dominance of English.

=== World Esperanto Congress ===
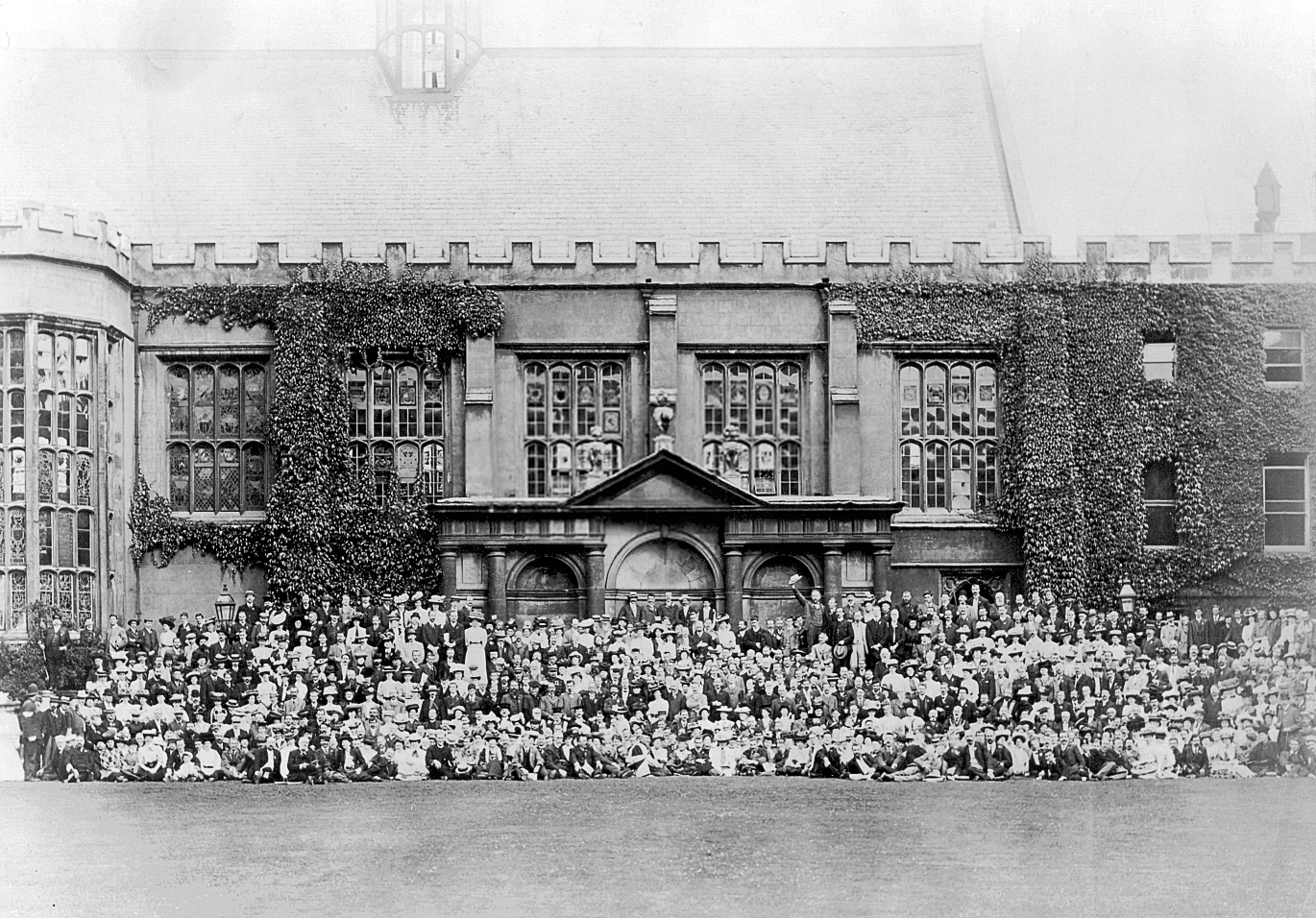
Attendees at the World Esperanto Congress, 1907

The World Esperanto Congress (Esperanto: Universala Kongreso de Esperanto) is an annual Esperanto convention. It has the longest tradition among international Esperanto conventions, with an almost unbroken run for 119 years. The congresses have been held since August 5, 1905, every year, except during World War I, World War II, and the COVID-19 pandemic. Since the 1920s, the Universal Esperanto Association has been organizing these congresses.

These congresses take place every year and, over the 30 years from 1985 through 2014, have gathered an average of about 2,000 participants (since World War II it has varied from 800 to 6,000, depending on the venue). The average number of countries represented is about 60. Some specialized organizations also gather a few hundred participants in their annual meetings. The World Congress usually takes place in the last week of July or first week of August, beginning and ending on a Saturday (8 days in total). For many years ILERA has operated an amateur radio station during the conventions.

Today, the congress is always held in the last week of July, to mark the release of Unua Libro.

== See also ==
- Zamenhof Day
