= Zamenhof Day =

Commemoration in Esperanto culture

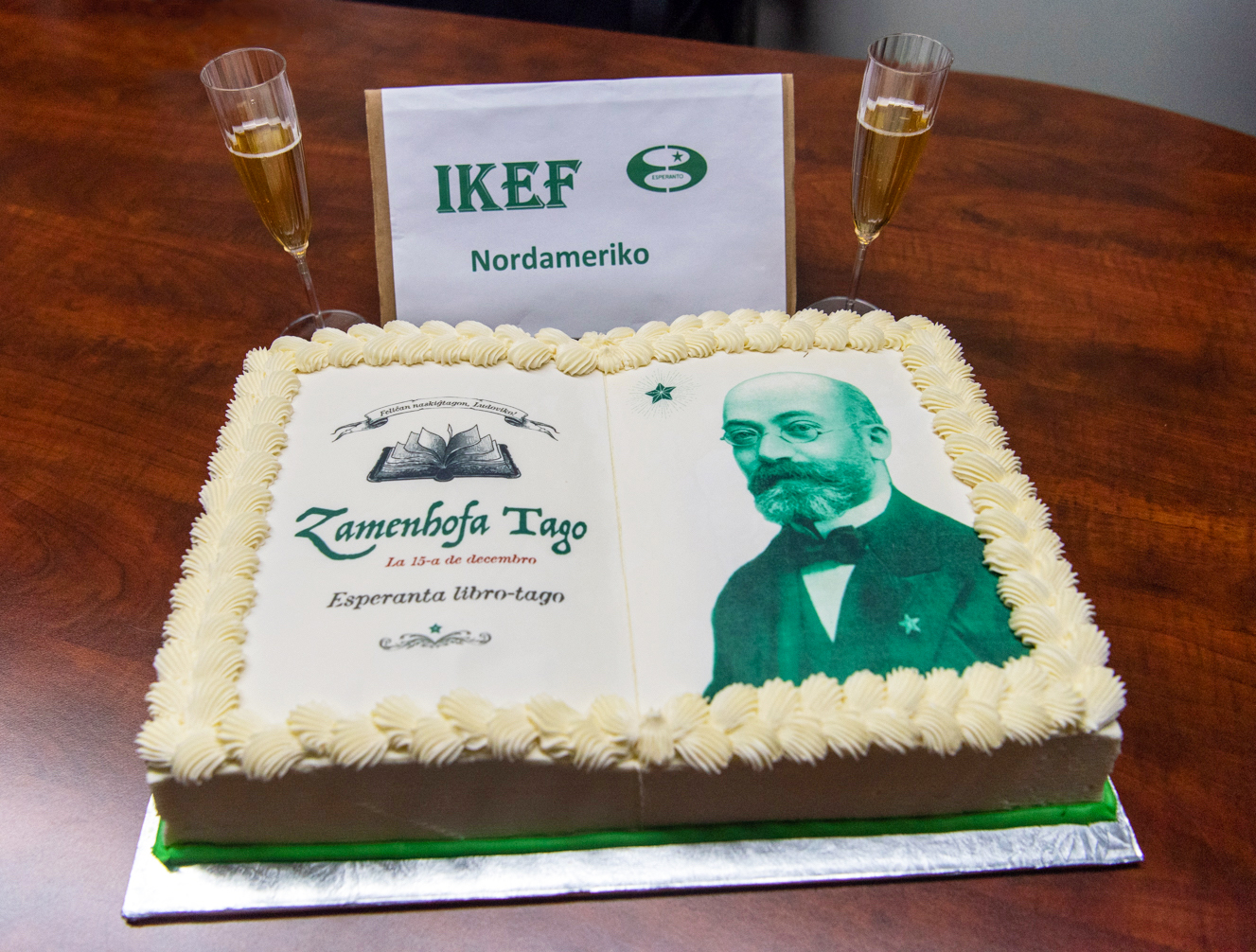
- Cake at a Zamenhof Day celebration in Nova Scotia, Canada, 2019
- Official name: Zamenhofa Tago (Esperanto)
- Also called: Esperanto Literature Day, Esperanto Day, Zamenhof's Birthday, Book Day
- Observed by: International Esperanto community
- Type: Cultural holiday
- Date: 15 December
- Next time: 15 December 2026
- Frequency: annual

Zamenhof Day (Esperanto: Zamenhofa Tago, Polish: Dzień Zamenhofa), also called Esperanto Book Day, is celebrated on 15 December, the birthday of Esperanto creator L. L. Zamenhof. It is the most widely celebrated day in Esperanto culture. On this day, Esperantists hold information sessions and cultural gatherings to promote literature in Esperanto.

The history of celebrating Esperanto on Zamenhof's birthday can be traced back to 17 December 1878, when at a birthday party for his 19th birthday he presented to his friends his Lingwe uniwersala, the first version of his international language. By 1887, this language had evolved into what is now recognized as Esperanto when he published the Unua Libro. 15 December previously used to be also known as Esperanto Day, but that is now celebrated on 26 July, the day Unua Libro was published. As of 1927 onwards, 15 December is celebrated within the Esperanto movement as Esperanto Book Day as it is customary to purchase a new book on Esperanto on that occasion.

== Zamenhof's 150th birth anniversary ==
15 December 2009 marked 150 years since Zamenhof's birth, and there were several events to celebrate. On this date, the authorities in his home town of Białystok, Poland, opened The Ludwik Zamenhof Centre, and a symposium honoring Zamenhof was held in New York City, featuring talks by Arika Okrent and Humphrey Tonkin among other professors.

Also on this date, the search engine Google, in 33 national language versions (but not the international English one), bore a special version of their logo (a Doodle) emblazoned with the Esperanto flag in honor of the occasion, which generated, between the 30 biggest Wikipedia languages, 1,750,000 page views on the articles "L. L. Zamenhof".

== See also ==
- Esperanto Day
