= Lingvo internacia =

Lingvo internacia means international language in Esperanto. It may refer to:

- Esperanto, the original name for the language
- Lingvo Internacia (periodical), the second Esperanto periodical, published monthly from 1895 to 1914
- Unua Libro, the original title of the 1887 book by L. L. Zamenhof
