= Théophile Cart =

French Esperantist professor & linguist

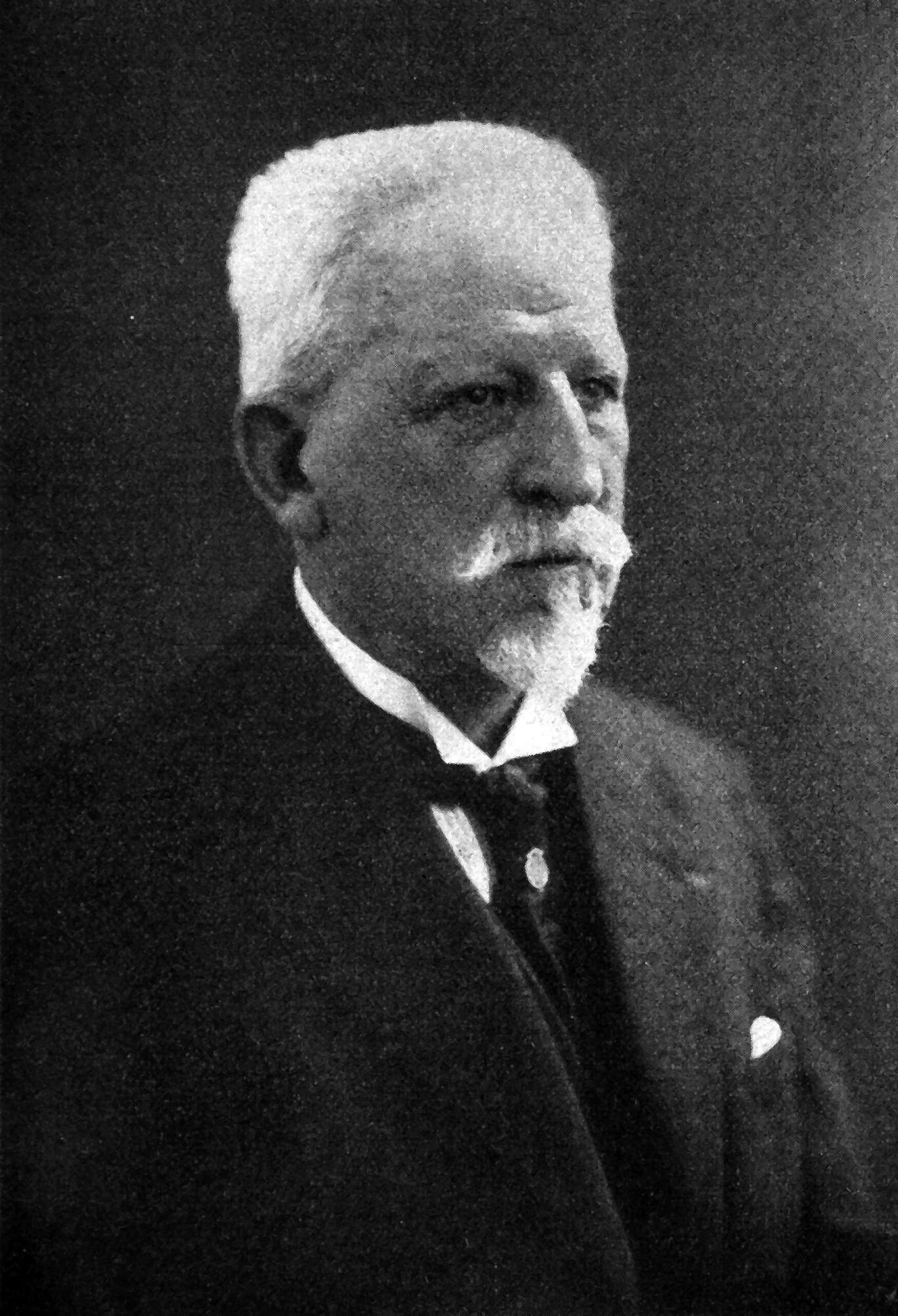
Professor Théophile Cart

Théophile Cart (31 March 1855 in Saint-Antoine-de-Breuilh - 21 May 1931 in Paris) was a French Esperantist professor and linguist.

Beginning in 1907, Cart was an editor for Lingvo Internacia.

== Biography ==
Théophile Cart was the son of a Protestant pastor and the eldest of five children.

He obtained his teaching certification in German in 1885 and worked as a French language lecturer at Uppsala University in Sweden in 1891–1892. A teacher at the École Alsacienne and then at the Lycée Henri IV in Paris (1892–1921) and at the Sciences Po (1893–1931), he is known for founding the Presa Esperanta Ligilo printing house and bookshop in 1904.

In 1903, he gave a speech in Amiens that marked the birth of the city's Esperanto Society. Jules Verne echoed this in his unfinished novel Voyage d'études, mentioning it in Chapter III.

Vice-president of the French Society for the Propagation of Esperanto (1905–1909), in 1905 he was one of the main defenders of Fundamento de Esperanto, a book laying down the foundations of the language.

He contributed to the journal Lingvo Internacia and became its editor-in-chief in 1908. In 1912, he was elected president of the French Esperanto Society and, in 1920, of the Linguistic Society of Paris and the Akademio de Esperanto (1920–1931).

In 1921, he organized the first international congress of blind Esperantists in Prague.

A supporter of Esperanto language orthodoxy, he took part in controversies over morphology and syntax issues that stirred Esperanto-speaking circles at the beginning of the century, as well as in polemics that threatened the unity of the Esperanto movement at the time.

He earned his greatest merit during the crisis of 1907–1908, when the emergence of Ido threatened to divide the Esperanto movement. He then devoted all his energy, all his abilities, and all his temperament to preventing the schism.He succeeded in this thanks to his persistent warnings about the risks posed to the language by constant change. From that moment on, and later as president of the Akademio de Esperanto, he fought tirelessly against any change that, in his opinion, was not the result of natural evolution.

He died on 21 May 1931 in Paris, and was buried on 23 May at the Père Lachaise Cemetery (96th division).
