= Unua Libro =

1887 book by L. L. Zamenhof

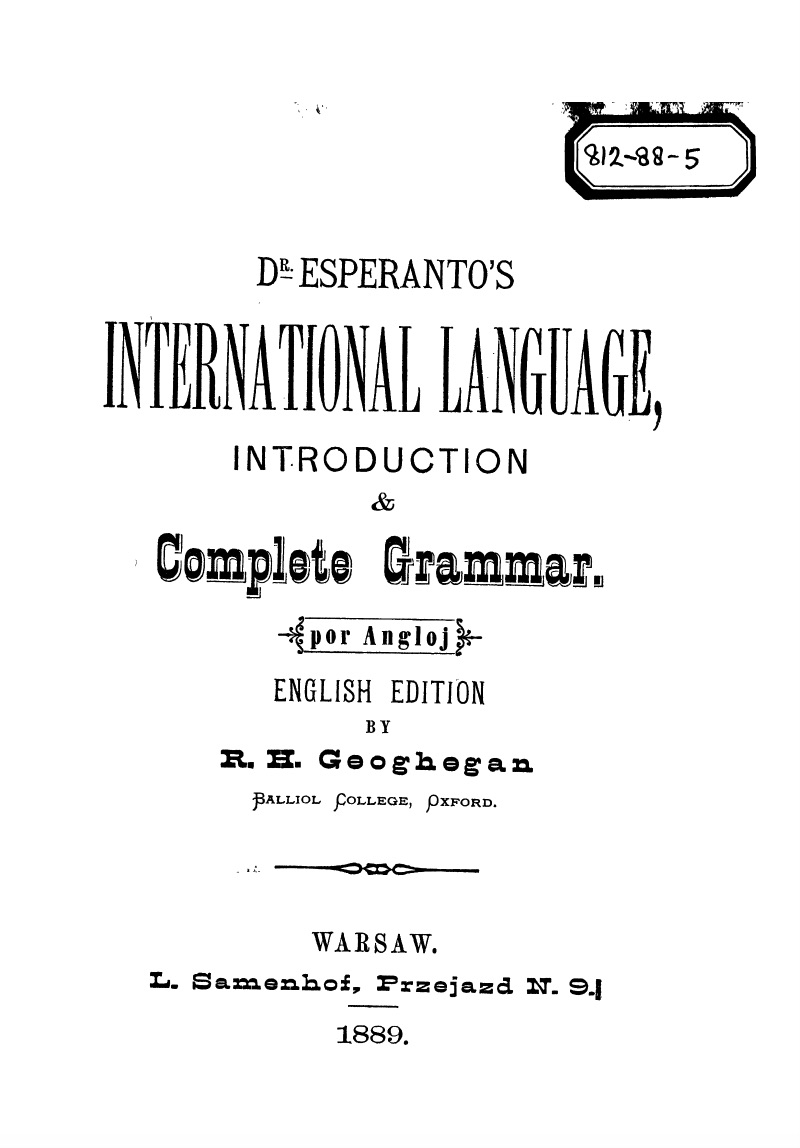
- Dr. Esperanto's International Language (1889 Geoghegan translation)
- Author: L. L. Zamenhof
- Audio read by: Nicholas James Bridgewater (LibriVox)
- Original title: Международный языкъ
- Translator: Julian Steinhaus (1888); Richard Geoghegan (1889); Henry Phillips Jr. (1889)
- Language: various
- Subject: Esperanto, international auxiliary language
- Published: Warsaw, Congress Poland, Russian Empire
- Publisher: Chaim Kelter
- Publication date: 26 July [O.S. 14 July] 1887
- Pages: 42
- Followed by: Dua Libro
- Original text: Международный языкъ at Russian Wikisource
- Translation: Unua Libro at Wikisource

Dr. Esperanto's International Language (Note: Dr. Esperanto's International Language is the title of the 1889 Geoghegan translation, the standard English translation. Other titles of English translations include Dr. Esperanto's International Tongue, the 1888 Steinhaus translation, and An Attempt towards an International Language, the 1889 Phillips translation.) (Russian: Международный язык), commonly referred to as Unua Libro (First Book), is an 1887 book by L. L. Zamenhof, in which he first introduced and described the constructed language Esperanto. First published in Russian on 26 July [O.S. 14 July] 1887, the publication of Unua Libro marks the formal beginning of the Esperanto movement.

Writing under the pseudonym "Dr. Esperanto", Zamenhof originally referred to the language as the international language; the use of Esperanto did not arise until 1889 when people began to use his pseudonym as the name of the language itself. Zamenhof reproduced a significant portion of the content of Unua Libro in the 1905 Fundamento de Esperanto, which he established as the sole obligatory authority over Esperanto in the Declaration of Boulogne, ratified by the first World Esperanto Congress later that year.

== History ==
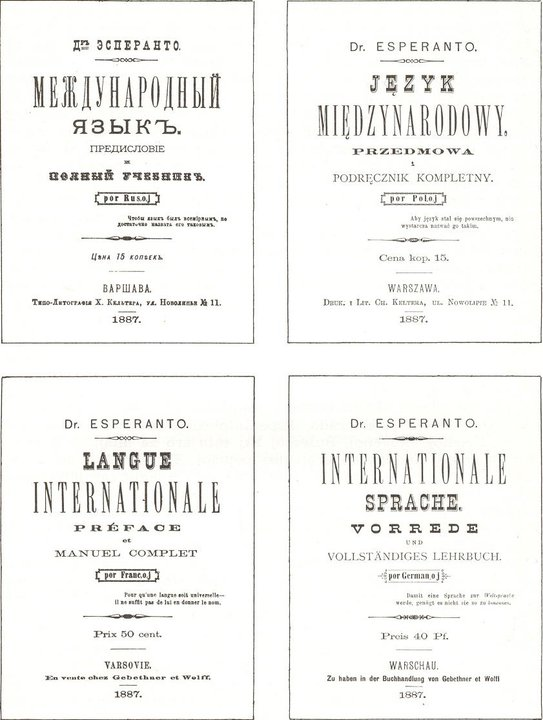
The original Russian publication of Unua Libro and the 1887 Polish, French, and German translations

After many years of developing the language, Zamenhof completed Unua Libro by the spring of 1885 and spent the next two years looking for a publisher. In 1887, shortly after he married his wife Klara, his new father-in-law Aleksandr Silbernik advised him to use money from Klara's dowry to find a publisher. Following his advice, Zamenhof found a publisher in Warsaw, Chaim Kelter. On 26 July [O.S. 14 July] 1887, Kelter published the book in Russian as International Language (Russian: Международный язык). Before the end of the year, Kelter published the Polish, French, and German editions of the book, as well.

In 1888, Zamenhof had Julian Steinhaus translate the book into English, and the translation was published under the title Dr. Esperanto's International Tongue. However, when Richard Geoghegan pointed out that Steinhaus's translation was very poor, Zamenhof destroyed his remaining copies and requested that Geoghegan produce a fresh translation. Geoghegan's translation of the book, titled Dr. Esperanto's International Language, was published on 17 January [O.S. 5 January] 1889 and became the standard English translation. Henry Phillips Jr., a secretary of the American Philosophical Society and early supporter of Esperanto, also produced a translation in 1889, titled An Attempt towards an International Language, but Geoghegan's translation remains the preferred standard.

Unua Libro was also translated into Hebrew, Yiddish, Swedish, and Lithuanian in 1889 and then into Danish, Bulgarian, Italian, Spanish, and Czech in 1890.

The name Unua Libro was applied retroactively to the book in relation to the title of Zamenhof's 1888 book Dua Libro (Second Book).

In 1905, Zamenhof reproduced much of the content of Unua Libro in Fundamento de Esperanto, which he established as the only obligatory authority over Esperanto in the Declaration of Boulogne at the first World Esperanto Congress later that year. However, in his 1888 Aldono al la Dua Libro (Supplement to the Second Book), he officially altered the spelling of the suffixes of the temporal correlatives (when, then, always, sometimes, never) from -ian to -iam, which rendered the Esperanto of Unua Libro slightly outdated.

== Content ==
The book consists of three parts, an introduction, a grammar section, and a dictionary.

Zamenhof begins by renouncing all rights to the language, putting it in the public domain.

In the introduction, Zamenhof lays out his case for the need for an international auxiliary language (IAL). He states that previous attempts, such as Volapük, have failed because they have not overcome the three main difficulties an IAL must overcome in order to succeed. Those difficulties are:

1. To render the study of the language so easy as to make its acquisition mere play to the learner.

2. To enable the learner to make direct use of his knowledge with persons of any nationality, whether the language be universally accepted or not; in other words, the language is to be directly a means of international communication.

3. To find some means of overcoming the natural indifference of mankind, and disposing them, in the quickest manner possible, and en masse, to learn and use the proposed language as a living one, and not only in last extremities, and with the key at hand.

— L. L. Zamenhof, Unua Libro

In the next three parts, he addresses each difficulty specifically and explains why he believes Esperanto is fit to overcome them.

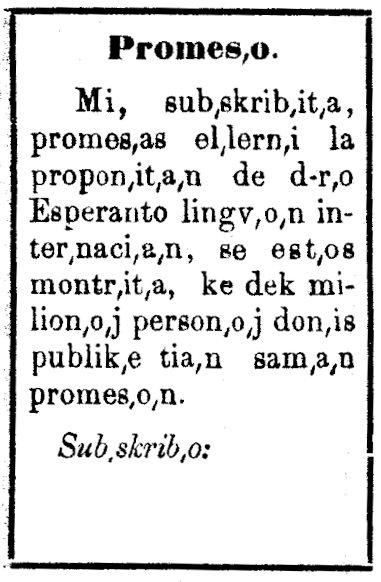
Slip for the universal vote campaign

In part I, he explains the simplicity and flexibility of Esperanto grammar, particularly due to its regularity and use of affixes.

In part II, he demonstrates the ease of using Esperanto for international communication due to a simple and clear vocabulary. To demonstrate this, he translates the Our Father and Genesis 1:1–9 and presents a fictional letter and a few poems in Esperanto—"El Heine'", a translation, and "Mia penso" and "Ho, mia kor'", both original.

In part III, he presents an idea called the "universal vote", which is a campaign to allot 10 million signatures of people making the following pledge: "I, the undersigned, promise to learn the international language, proposed by Dr. Esperanto, if it shall be shown that ten million similar promises have been publicly given." He argues that this will prevent anyone from wasting time on learning the language since, once 10 million signatures have been gathered, there will be a significant population obliged to learn the language, rendering the language useful. He also welcomes critical feedback for the next year and promises to consider criticism before publishing a special booklet that will give definitive form to the language the following year (which was to be Aldono al la Dua Libro). Additionally, he lays out guidelines for a language academy to guide the evolution of the language in the future (which was to be the Akademio de Esperanto).

In the grammar section, he explains the Esperanto alphabet and sixteen grammar rules.

In the dictionary section, he presents a dictionary with 917 roots of vocabulary.

== Reception and legacy ==
Zamenhof received a wide range of reactions to Unua Libro, from mocking criticism to avid interest. In the hundreds of letters he received, he saw enough support to prompt him to publish Dua Libro in January 1888 and La Esperantisto in 1889, in order to provide more Esperanto reading material for those with interest. In 1889, he also published Russian–Esperanto and German–Esperanto dictionaries to increase Esperanto vocabulary, as well as Aldono al la Dua Libro, a supplement to Dua Libro, to establish the definitive form of the language, a document he promised in part III of Unua Libro.

By all measures, Zamenhof's "universal vote" campaign failed. By 1889, he had only reached 1000 signatures, a mere 0.01% of his goal of 10 million. Nevertheless, the Esperanto movement continued onward. Among the early supporters were educated Russian and Polish Jews, Leo Tolstoy and his followers, Eastern European freemasons, and speakers of Volapük who had lost hope in their language.

== See also ==
- History of Esperanto
- Esperanto Day
