= La Revuo =

Magazine written in the Esperanto language

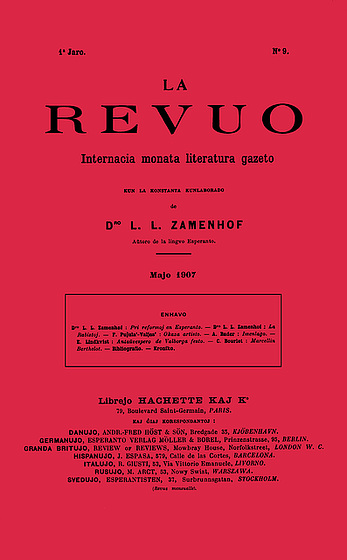
- May 1907 edition of La Revuo
- Editor: Félicien Menu de Ménil
- Frequency: Monthly
- Publisher: Hachette
- Founder: L. L. Zamenhof
- Founded: 1906
- First issue: September 1, 1906
- Final issue: August 1914
- Language: Esperanto

La Revuo: Internacia monata literatura gazeto (English: The Review: An International Monthly Literature Magazine) was an Esperanto periodical, published from 1906 to 1914. It was the third Esperanto periodical, following La Esperantisto (1889–1895) and Lingvo Internacia (1895–1914). Together with Lingvo Internacia, La Revuo was one of the two central Esperanto publications leading up to World War I.

== History ==
La Revuo was first published on September 1, 1906.

L. L. Zamenhof published many of his translations originally in La Revuo and later published them as independent books.

La Revuo ceased publication in August 1914, largely due to the death of Carlo Bourlet.

== See also ==
- History of Esperanto
