= Esperanto symbols =

Symbols of the Esperanto language

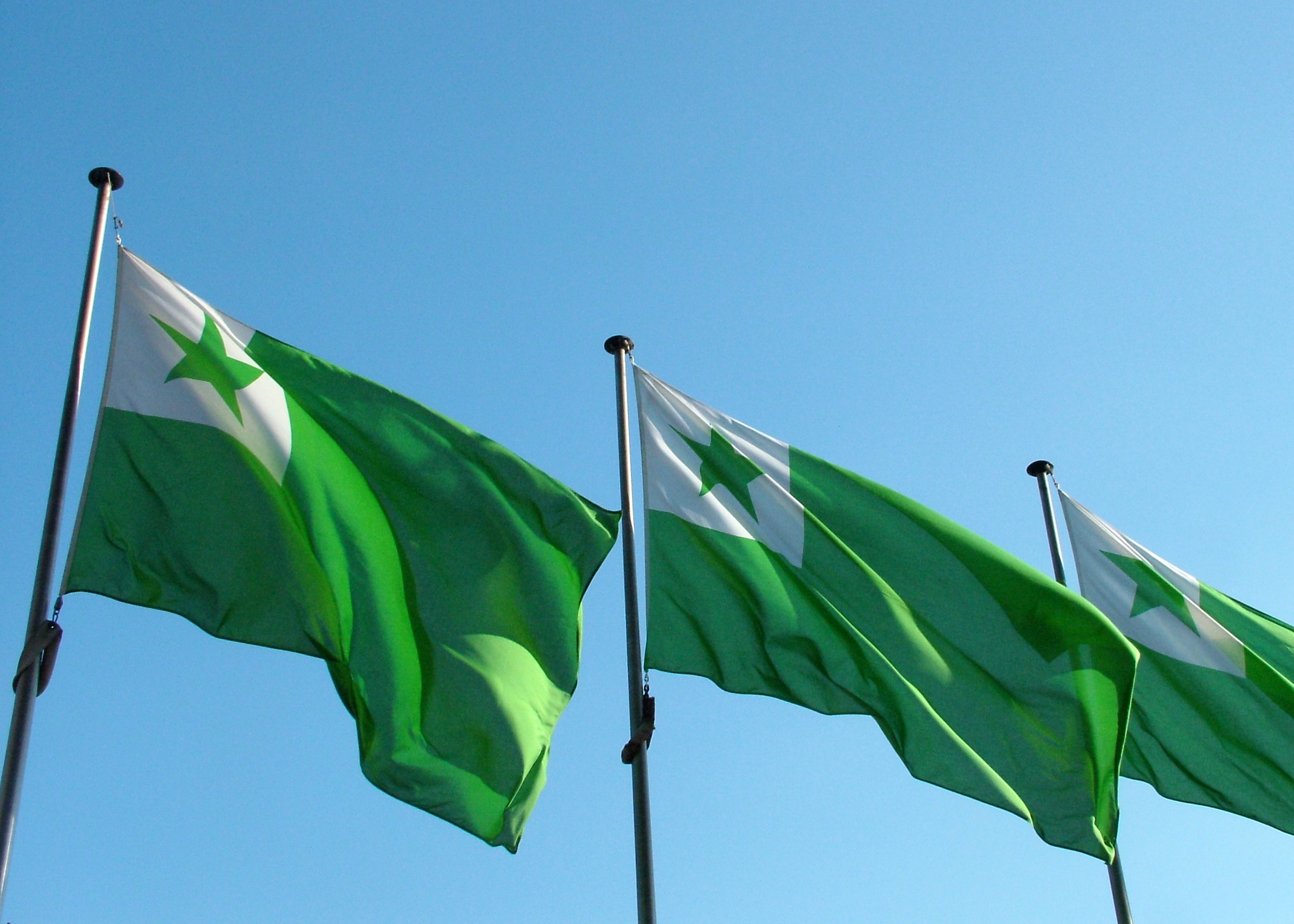
Esperanto flags prominently displaying the Verda Stelo in Rotterdam, the Netherlands

Esperanto symbols, primarily the Esperanto flag, have seen much consistency over the time of Esperanto's existence (namely in the consistent usage of the colour green), though a few variations in exact flag patterning and symbology exist.

The main flag of Esperanto, featuring the Verda Stelo ('Green Star'), was adopted in 1905 for use as a symbol of mutual recognition among Esperantists, and is used by most Esperantists. As an alternative to the flag, the jubilea simbolo ('jubilee symbol') was proposed in 1987.

== History ==
=== Verda Stelo ===
The Green Star (Verda Stelo)

Since the earliest days of Esperanto, the colour green has been used as a symbol of mutual recognition, and it appears prominently in all Esperanto symbols. In a letter to The British Esperantist in 1911, L. L. Zamenhof, the creator of Esperanto, wrote: "It seems to me, that my attention was drawn to the color green by Mr. Richard H. Geoghegan and from that time I began to publish all of my works with green covers . . . Looking at one of my pamphlets that I had entirely by chance printed with a green cover, he pointed out that this was the color of his homeland, Ireland; at that time it came to me, that we could certainly look at that color as a symbol of HOPE. About the five-pointed star, it seems to me, that at first Mr. de Beaufront had it imprinted on his grammar [of Esperanto]. I liked that and I adopted it as a symbol. Afterward by association of ideas, the star appeared with a green color."

The Verda Stelo was first proposed in an 1892 article in La Esperantisto for use as a symbol of mutual recognition among Esperantists. The flag was created by the Esperanto Club of Boulogne-sur-Mer, initially for their own use, but was adopted as the flag of the worldwide Esperanto movement by a decision of the first World Esperanto Congress, which took place in 1905 in that town.

=== Other proposed flags and symbols ===
The Jubilee symbol (jubilea simbolo)

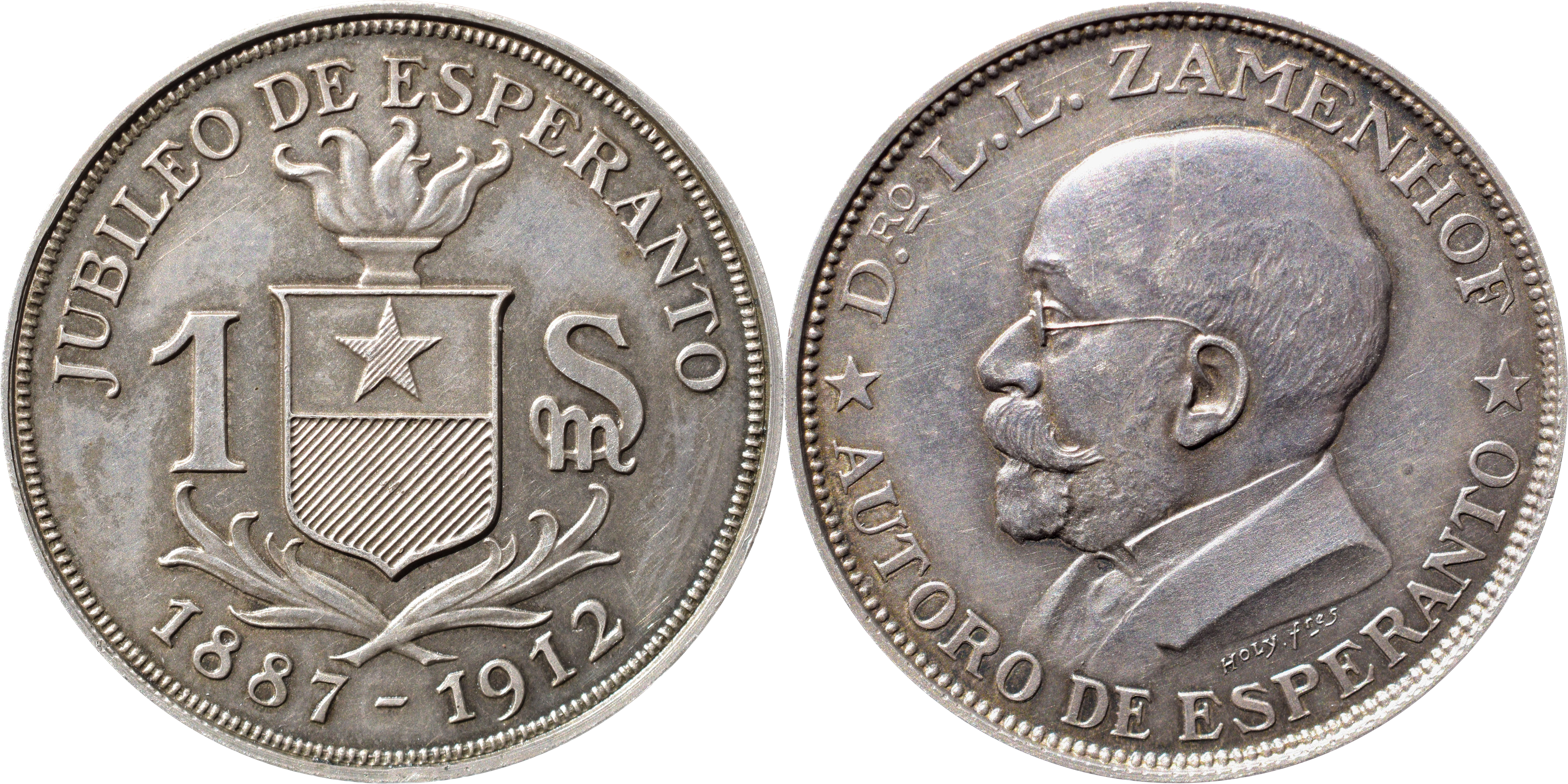
Esperanto coin 1 Spesmilo, international currency used before World War I

In 1905, delegates to the first conference of Esperantists at Boulogne-sur-Mer, unanimously approved a version differing from the modern only by the superimposition of an "E" over the green star. Other variants include that for Christian Esperantists, with a white Christian cross superimposed upon the green star, and that for Leftists, with the color of the field changed from green to red.

Some Esperanto speakers consider the traditional flag too nationalistic for an international language, so many organizations no longer recommend its use and, instead, use the jubilea simbolo (jubilee symbol, two green "E"s facing each other—or alternatively a Latin-alphabet "E" facing a Cyrillic-alphabet "Э", the first letter of "Эсперанто", the Russian name for Esperanto—on a white field). This symbol was created in 1987 by a Brazilian Esperantist to mark the centenary of the creation of Esperanto.

== Design of the Verda Stelo ==
Proportions of the Esperanto flag

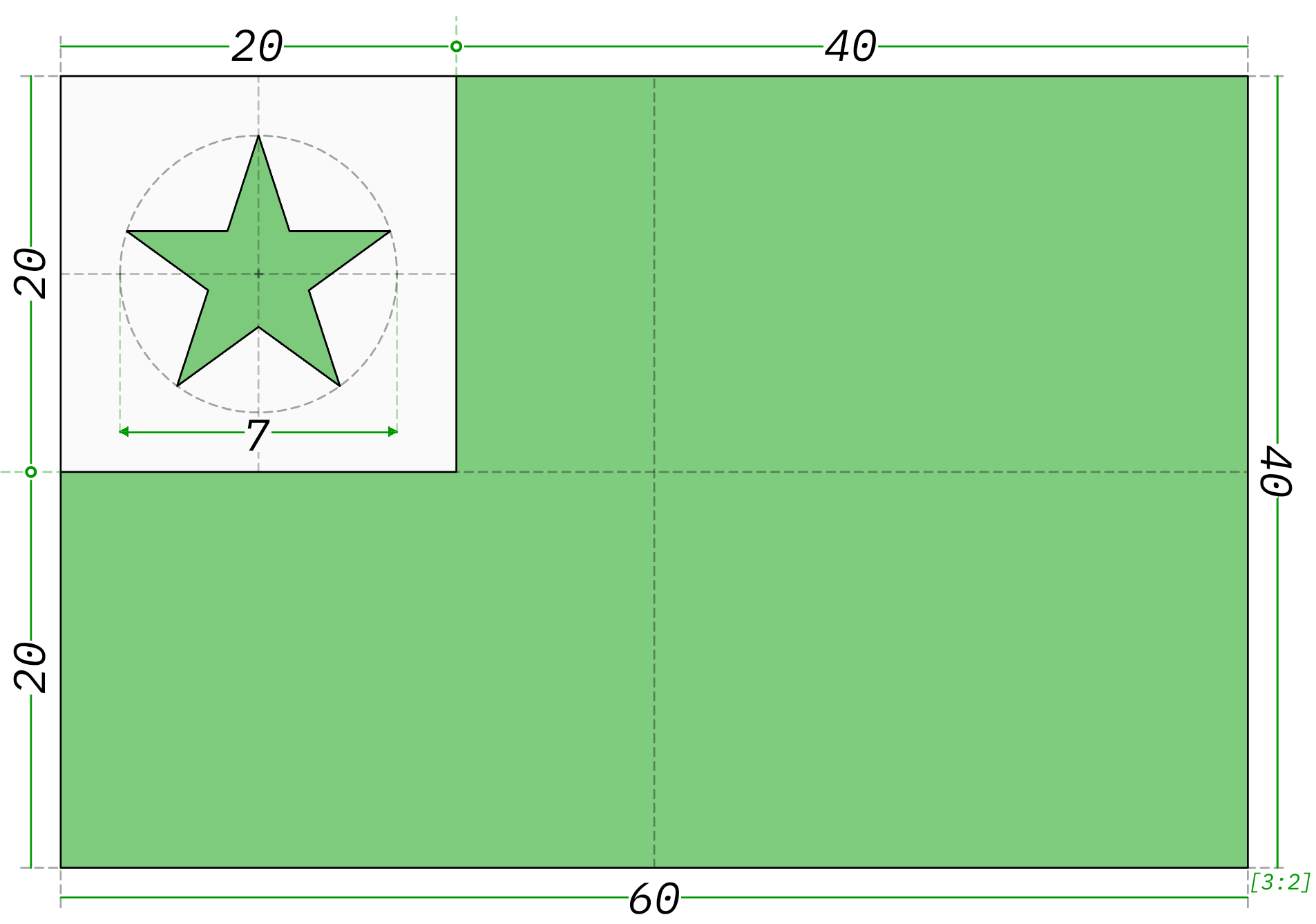
Construction sheet of the Esperanto flag

The Esperanto flag is composed of a green background with a white square (canton) in the upper lefthand corner, which in turn contains a green star. The green field symbolizes hope, the white symbolizes peace and neutrality, and the five-pointed star represents the five continents (Europe, America, Asia, Oceania, Africa).

By recommendation of the board of the Universal Esperanto Association, the flag should have the following proportions: The ratio of the width of the flag to the height of the flag to a side of the white square should be 3 to 2 to 1. The ratio of a side of the white square to the radius of a circle enclosing the star should be 10 to 3.5.

== In popular culture ==
Most Esperantists continue to hold the verda stelo dear as a symbol of international or supranational solidarity (with the jubilea simbolo jokingly called la melono ('the melon') by some), though many also regard the preference of one symbol over another as a purely personal choice. At most Esperanto congresses, the flag, the star, and the jubilea simbolo can all be seen in use on displays or being worn as badges. Sometimes, Esperanto travelers will display the flag, wear a badge with one of the above symbols, or even wear green clothes, to make themselves known to other Esperanto speakers.

On December 15, 2009, the Verda Stelo flew on the Google home search page "Google" logo to mark L. L. Zamenhof's 150th birthday. The flag flew on a flagstaff consisting of the "L" in the search-company's name.

== See also ==
- Finvenkism – Pursuing worldwide adoption of Esperanto
- Flag icons for languages – Using national flags as icons for languages
