= The Shadow (fairy tale) =

- Short story by Hans Christian Andersen
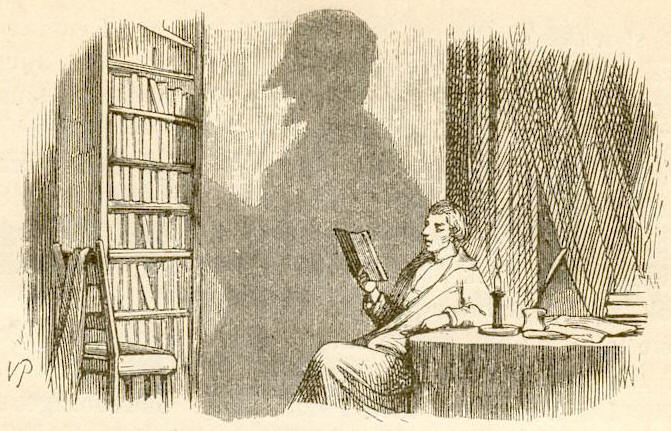
- Vilhelm Pedersen illustration
- Original title: Danish: Skyggen
- Country: Denmark
- Language: Danish
- Genre: Literary fairy tale

Publication
- Publication date: 1847

"The Shadow" (Danish: Skyggen) is a literary fairy tale by Danish poet and author Hans Christian Andersen. The tale was first published in 1847.

A learned man's shadow becomes self-aware and takes on a life of its own. The shadow gains insight into the dark side of human behaviour, then returns to the man and enslaves him. Fearful of being discovered, the shadow has the man killed.

== Analysis ==
Jacqueline Banerjee suggested that Andersen wrote the story as a form of indirect revenge against Edvard Collin, the son of Andersen's patron, who had rejected him.

Literary critic Jack Zipes took the story to represent the Hegelian dynamic of master and slave.

== Publication ==
"The Shadow" was first published 6 April 1847 as a part of New Fairy Tales. Second Volume. First Collection. 1847. (Nye Eventyr. Andet Bind. Første Samling. 1847.). The work was re-published December 1847 as a part of A Christmas Greeting to my English Friends, again 18 December 1849 as a part of Fairy Tales. 1850. (Eventyr. 1850.), and 30 March 1863 as a part of Fairy Tales and Stories. Second Volume. 1863. (Eventyr og Historier. Andet Bind. 1863.).

== Precedent ==
In 1814, three decades before the publication of "The Shadow", Adelbert von Chamisso had published "Peter Schlemihl's Miraculous Story", a story about a man who sells his shadow to the devil in exchange for a bottomless wallet. Andersen's story was prompted by Chamisso's, and he refers to it in "The Shadow":

He was very annoyed, not so much because the shadow had disappeared, but because he knew there was a story; well-known to everybody at home in the cold countries, about a man without a shadow; and if he went back now and told them his own story, they would be sure to say that he was just an imitator, and that was the last thing he wanted.

Andersen's story in turn appears to have influenced Oscar Wilde's "The Fisherman and His Soul".

== Adaptations ==
"The Shadow" became the first text of some considerable length to be published in Esperanto. It was contained in the 1888 Dua Libro (Second Book) by the creator of that language, L. L. Zamenhof (the first book had contained only single bible verses, short poems and the like).

Evgeny Shvarts explicitly based his 1940 play Tyen (The Shadow) on Andersen's tale, introducing additional characters and plot lines and a different ending. This play was the subject of two film adaptations, in 1971 and in 1991.

In 1945 the story was adapted as an episode of the syndicated radio program The Weird Circle.

In 1994 Frederik Magle, Thomas Eje, Niels-Henning Ørsted Pedersen and others released the album The Song Is a Fairytale with songs based on Hans Christian Andersen's fairytales. "The Shadow" is one of the songs.

In 1998, Jannik Hastrup released an animated version, H.C. Andersen's The Long Shadow.

Skuggaleikur (Shadow Play) is an opera by Icelandic composer Karólína Eiríksdóttir with libretto by Sjón. Premiered in November 2006.

In 2003, the Carolina Ballet premiered a ballet version of "The Shadow" with choreography by artistic director Robert Weiss, set to the music of Khachaturian, Kabalevsky, Ligeti, Fauré and Rachmaninoff. The ballet features a sequence in which the poet contemplates his shadow in the mirror. The image, which at first copies his movements in complete synchrony, seamlessly emerges from the mirror frame (through changes in lighting) as another dancer in a gray full body stocking.

In 2022, Big Finish Productions released an adaptation of "The Shadow", called "The Shadow Master" in the eighth release of their War Master audiobook series, "The War Master: Escape from Reality", starring Derek Jacobi.

In 2026 at the La Mirada Theatre for the Performing Arts, Mixed eMotion Theatrix performed a stage show based on "The Shadow" incorporating music, dance, puppetry, shadow puppetry, and video projections.

== See also ==
- List of works by Hans Christian Andersen
- 1847 in literature
- Vilhelm Pedersen, first illustrator of Andersen's fairy tales
