= Modern evolution of Esperanto =

History of linguistic changes to Esperanto

The international auxiliary language Esperanto has been mostly stable since its creation, especially as compared to other constructed languages. This is due to the Declaration of Boulogne in 1905, which made the early works of Zamenhof binding; most attempts to change the language have been therefore seen as distinct language projects (so-called Esperantidos), and for the most part the Esperanto community has ignored them. The main change in the language has been a great expansion of the vocabulary, largely driven by translations of technical jargon, which is explicitly allowed for by the Declaration of Boulogne. However, there have been more subtle changes to syntax and semantics as the majority of Esperanto authors shifted from native speakers of Slavic languages and German to other languages, such as French and English. (Note: See: evolution of Esperanto.) This article considers some of the purposeful changes to the language since Boulogne.

== Lexicon ==
There has been considerable debate over whether technical terminology should be taken from international usage by adopting new roots into Esperanto, or whether, in cases where the need can be met through traditional Esperanto word formation, that is the better way to go. To a large extent this is a cultural debate: Europeans who are already familiar with such "international" vocabulary often favor adopting such terms, whereas Asians who may not be familiar with them often favor replacing them. One example is the word for "computer". Early proposals for the word "computer" included komputero and komputoro, but they were eventually replaced by the internal creation komputilo, from the verb komputi "to compute" plus the suffix -ilo "instrument".

There has been some criticism of using the prefix mal- to create the antonyms of common adjectives, such as mallonga "short" from longa "long", or malmultekosta "inexpensive" from multekosta "expensive". Several dozen neologisms have been coined for these antonyms (in these cases kurta "short" and ĉipa "cheap"), often for purposes of poetry, but few have met with much acceptance. One of the few that have been is dura "hard", as the original word malmola, from mola "soft", is argued to sound too soft to mean "hard". In one case an antonymic suffix has been proposed, a laudatory -el-, which would contrast with pejorative -aĉ-: skribo "writing", skribaĉo "scrawl, scribbling", skribelo "calligraphy". Unlike aĉa, it is problematic to use the suffix -el- as a word in its own right, due to an existing preposition and prefix el.

== Phonology ==
The most visible change in Esperanto phonology has been the near-loss of the sound ĥ. For example, the German-derived word ĥino "Chinese" has been replaced by an Italian/English ĉino. In most other cases, ĥ has been replaced with k, as in kemio for ĥemio "chemistry"; the only words which commonly retain it are ĉeĥo "Czech", eĥo "echo", and ĥoro (or koruso) "chorus", though it continues to be used in the transcription of foreign names. (Note: See: loss of phonemic ĥ and the section preceding that for examples of assimilation which do not affect the written language.)

Changes in phonotactics, which was never laid out explicitly by Zamenhof, have been introduced along with new vocabulary and especially foreign names. One of these is the extension of ŭ, which originally was only found as a vowel in the diphthongs aŭ and eŭ, to a consonantal use analogous to English w, which Zamenhof had universally replaced with v. However, Slavs and Germans, among others, have difficulty distinguishing v and consonantal ŭ, and in most neologisms, consonantal ŭ has been replaced with v, as it has in ŭato → vato "watt". In proper names, such as Ŭakajama ~ Vakajama "Wakayama", there is more variation. Similarly, new ŭ diphthongs such as oŭ have not gotten far; the English word "bowl" was adopted as bovlo, not *boŭlo. (Note: However, there has been no conflict over introducing changes which conform to both Esperanto and Western European languages. For example, even though the European currency is required by law to be spelled "euro" in official documents in all European Union languages which use a Latin script, in Esperanto the spelling eŭro is used to conform to the pronunciation of the word in those languages.)

Another debated change has been the introduction of geminate consonants. In traditional Esperanto, double consonants may occur across morpheme boundaries, as in mallonga (mal-longa) "short", but are not found within roots. Most words introduced with double letters (including tĉ and dĝ) have since been modified, for example Buddo → Budao "Buddha". Perhaps the most common root to retain a double consonant is finno "Finn", which is a near homonym with fino "end". Although suomo has been introduced as a replacement, this has not been used for compounds such as finno-ugra "Finno-Ugric". There is considerable debate whether departing from the international forms of such words is desirable.

== Morphology ==
Esperanto morphology has been extended by new suffixes, but outside of international technical terminology few of these are in wide use. Two have been accepted as official: The suffix -io used to derive the names of countries and states, such as Meksikio "United States of Mexico" vs. Meksiko "State of Mexico" vs. Meksikurbo "Mexico City" and Vaŝintonio "Washington state" vs. Vaŝintono "Washington, DC". Many Esperantists also use -io in place of -ujo, the original suffix for countries named after their inhabitants, so that Anglio "England" is found alongside the more traditional Anglujo. The other official addition is a suffix -enda indicating that something must be done (pagenda "payable (by)"); this was originally introduced as part of the Ido reform. A few other Ido suffixes have entered the language, especially in poetry, and are widely recognized, such as -oza "full of", as in poroza "porous".

The perceived clash between several national Romance languages, such as Spanish, Portuguese, and Italian, which use the final vowels -o and -a to mark gender, and Esperanto, which uses them to mark parts of speech, has led to a change in some women's names which end in -a in those languages. This has had less effect on names which parallel Esperanto usage, such as Jozefino "Josephine" (from Jozefo "Joseph"), but is now predominant in some sources in names such as Johana ~ Johanino "Joanna" and Mario ~ Maria ~ Mariino "Maria".

Another gender-related change has been a gradual reduction of the number of inherently masculine words. Originally all members of a profession, such as dentisto "a dentist", all people defined by a characteristic, such as junulo "a youth" and Kristano "a Christian", all ethnicities, such as anglo "an Englishman", and all verbal participles used for humans, such as kuranto "a runner", were masculine unless specifically made feminine with the suffix -ino; currently only some twenty words, mostly kinship terms, remain masculine.

A more radical change has been to purposefully eliminate gender from the remaining masculine roots such as patro "father" which are not essentially masculine (Note: Essentially masculine words include eŭnuko "eunuch", which cannot be meaningfully made feminine. There are also a few analogous essentially feminine words which are not addressed by these proposals.) by the introduction of a masculine suffix to parallel feminine -ino. The most common proposal is -iĉo, which is widely recognized. A parallel change is the introduction of a gender-neutral third-person singular pronoun to cover "s/he", but there was little agreement as to what this should be until finally most people settled on ri. (Note: See: gender in Esperanto.)

== Syntax ==
An early debate in Esperanto syntax was whether phrases such as "he was born" should use the present participle -at- (naskata for "born"), preferred by native speakers of Germanic and Slavic languages, or the past participle -it- (naskita), preferred by native speakers of Romance languages. The debate partially centered on whether the essential difference between the suffixes was one of tense or aspect, but primarily followed the conventions of speakers' native languages. Eventually a work-around using the inchoative suffix -iĝ- as a mediopassive became common as a way to avoid the debate entirely.

More recently, stative verbs have been increasingly used instead of copula-plus-adjective phrasing, following some poetic usage, so that one now frequently hears li sanas for li estas sana "he is well". This may have been inspired by Asian languages such as Chinese and Japanese which treat adjectival concepts as essentially verbal. There was resistance especially in the case of participles (li falantas "he is falling", li falantis "he was falling", li falintas "he has fallen", li falintis "he had fallen", etc.), which many Europeans found overly complex. Although still minority usage, the debate over such forms has largely subsided.

A few new prepositions have been introduced by removing the part-of-speech ending from existing roots. The most common of these is far "by", an abbreviation of fare de "done by". The phrase fare de helps avoid sometimes ambiguous readings of the preposition de "of, from, by". Another neologism is cit from the verb citi "to quote", and used to introduce quotations. (Sometimes je or na (below) is seen instead.)

An occasional difficulty in Esperanto is using the accusative with noun phrases which do not readily accept the accusative suffix -n, such as correlatives like ties "that one's", quotations, (Note: See cit above.) or phrases which already include an accusative suffix, such as provoj savontaj ĝin "attempts to save it", forpelado hundon "driving away the dog". Traditionally, the preposition de has been used in the latter situation, but this is highly ambiguous: forpeladon de hundo could mean the dog was driven away (accusative case), something was driven away by the dog, or something was driven away from the dog. An accusative preposition na has been proposed and is widely recognized. However, the existing indefinite preposition je might be used just as well: forpeladon na hundo, je hundo.

Conditional participles -unt-, -ut- have been created by analogy with the past, present, and future participles -int-, -it-; -ant-, -at-; -ont-, -ot-, by extending vowel equivalences of the verb tenses -is, -as, -os to the conditional mood -us. For example, la reĝunto is "the man who would be king"; a hakuta arbo is "a tree that would be chopped down" (if it weren't spiked, etc.). However, while these forms are readily recognized, they are uncommon. Similarly, a nonce active participle with gnomic tense has been created by analogy with existing pairs of noun and verb such as prezidento "president" and prezidi "to preside", and the resulting participles prezidanto "one who is (currently) presiding", etc. There is no passive equivalent apart from the inchoative suffix -iĝi mentioned above.

== See also ==
- Declaration of Boulogne
- Esperanto phonology
- Esperanto vocabulary
- History of Esperanto
