= Esperanto club =

An Esperanto club (Esperanto: Esperanto-klubo) is a club of Esperanto speakers, or Esperantists. In contrast to national or international Esperanto organizations, an Esperanto club usually limits its activities only to a certain city or region. Esperanto clubs have been forming the backbone of the Esperanto movement since the beginning of the movement, although recently the situation is starting to change due to the possibility of immediate and first-hand communication that is provided by the Internet.

The first Esperanto club was founded in Nuremberg on 18 February 1885, before Esperanto was published (1887) – originally it was a group of supporters of Volapük, who in 1888 unanimously converted to Esperanto, under the influence of Leopold Einstein. The Nuremberg club was also the first to start publishing an Esperanto magazine, La Esperantisto.

== Characteristics ==
Esperanto clubs may differ in a variety of ways:

- Existence of a permanent meeting place;
- Regularity and variety of activities;
- Solid member base (and collection of membership fees);
- Specialization in a certain level of Esperanto knowledge;
- Specific interest in a topic behind Esperanto itself (e.g. Esperanto teachers club, students club, club of Esperanto-speaking paramedics, club linked to a science center etc.);
- Relation to a national Esperanto organization (usually the local branch of the Universal Esperanto Association);
- Regular organization of Esperanto language courses.

=== List of first Esperanto clubs ===
Following is a list of Esperanto clubs founded between 1887 and 1895, i.e. during the first nine years of Esperanto's existence (names of the founders are given in brackets):

- 1888
  - Nuremberg (Christian Schmidt)
- 1889
  - Moscow
  - Sofia (Bogdanov)
- 1890
  - Schalke (Trompeter)
  - Ivanovo-Voznesensk (Antoni Grabowski)
- 1891
  - Munich - "Societo E-isto-ja" = Internacia Klubo de Korespondado (L. E. Meyer of Nuremberg)
  - Uppsala (S. Lundström)
  - Murom (W. Brzozowski)
  - Freiburg im Breisgau (dr. Haas)
  - Saint Petersburg (Art. Florell)
- 1892
  - Málaga
  - Gothenburg (G. Backman)
  - Osterby (Ossian Holmquist)
  - Erlangen (Fr. v. Brtesen)
  - Schweinfurt (P. Kramer, Kirschner, Brand)
  - Vilnius (A. Naumann)
- 1893
  - Warsaw (Al. Blumental, Rubin, J. Wasniewski)
- 1894
  - Steneby (Lindgven)
  - Odessa (Gernet, Borovko)
  - Reims-Soissons (Huisson)
  - Helsinki (W. Fagershom)
- 1895
  - Vladimir (V. Solodiĥin)

However, at the end of 1904, only three of these clubs were still in existence: Uppsala, Saint Petersburg, and Odessa. Other clubs often did not survive more than a year, as it was the case of the group in Reims, which was formed by young students of the local lyceum.

== See also ==
- Esperanto movement
