= Dua Libro =

1888 book by L. L. Zamenhof

Dua Libro de l' Lingvo Internacia
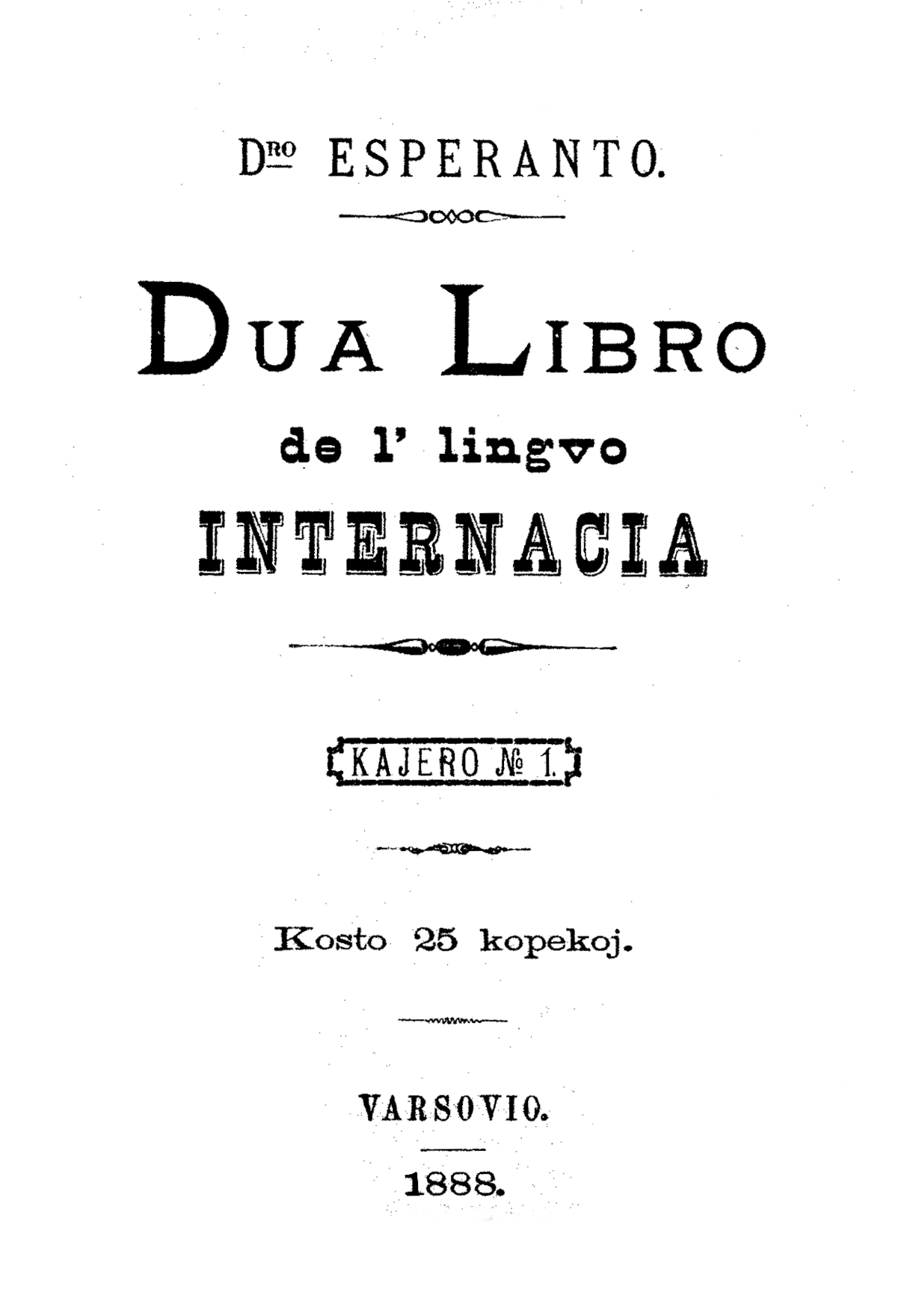
- Dua Libro de l' Lingvo Internacia (Esperanto edition)
- Author: L. L. Zamenhof
- Language: Esperanto
- Subject: Esperanto
- Published: Warsaw
- Publisher: Chaim Kelter
- Publication date: 1888; June 1888 (Aldono)
- Pages: 50
- Preceded by: Unua Libro
- Followed by: La Esperantisto
- Original text: Dua Libro de l' Lingvo Internacia at Esperanto Wikisource

Dua Libro de l' Lingvo Internacia (lit. 'Second Book of the International Language'), usually referred to simply as Dua Libro, is an 1888 book by L. L. Zamenhof. It is the second book in which Zamenhof wrote about the constructed language Esperanto, following Unua Libro in 1887, and the first book to be written entirely in the language.

Dua Libro consists primarily of translations, which Zamenhof provided as reading material for those who expressed interest in the language after the publication of Unua Libro the previous year. It also usually includes Aldono al la Dua Libro (Supplement to the Second Book), which was originally published separately. In Aldono, Zamenhof solidified Esperanto into its final form.

== History ==
Zamenhof originally intended to publish Dua Libro in five or six volumes throughout 1888, with one volume appearing approximately every two months. Zamenhof's intention with the publications was to provide reading material in Esperanto for those who expressed interest following the publication of Unua Libro in 1887, to respond to questions about the language, and to establish its final form as he promised to do in Unua Libro. Throughout 1888, he considered suggestions for changes to Esperanto, with the goal of establishing its final form by the time of publication of the final volume at the end of the year.

After the publication of Dua Libro in early 1888, Zamenhof decided that there was no need for all the other planned volumes, and instead, in June 1888, he published just one more document to answer some questions he received and to solidify the final form of the language, titled Aldono al la Dua Libro (Supplement to the Second Book), often simply called Aldono (Supplement).

== Content ==
Dua Libro consists of an introduction and three parts, with most versions also including the separately published Aldono at the end of the book.

In the introduction, part I, and part II, Zamenhof wrote about the state of the Esperanto project. In part II, he specifically wrote about the "universal vote" idea proposed in Unua Libro.

In part III, he wrote 20 sections of Esperanto text. The texts include collections of model sentences, a translation of "The Shadow" by Hans Christian Andersen, some popular sayings, and two poems—"Kanto de studentoj" and "El Heine'".

=== Aldono al la Dua Libro ===
In June 1888, Zamenhof published Aldono al la Dua Libro to answer frequently asked questions about Esperanto and to solidify its final form as he promised to do in Unua Libro.

In Aldono, the only change Zamenhof made to the language is the spelling of the endings of the temporal correlative words (when, then, sometime, always, and never) from -ian to the current -iam. He also discusses an initiative led by the American Philosophical Society to help perfect Esperanto and to encourage its use; however, the initiative failed to actualize due to a lack of interest.

== See also ==
- La Esperantisto
- History of Esperanto
