= Lingvo Internacia (periodical) =

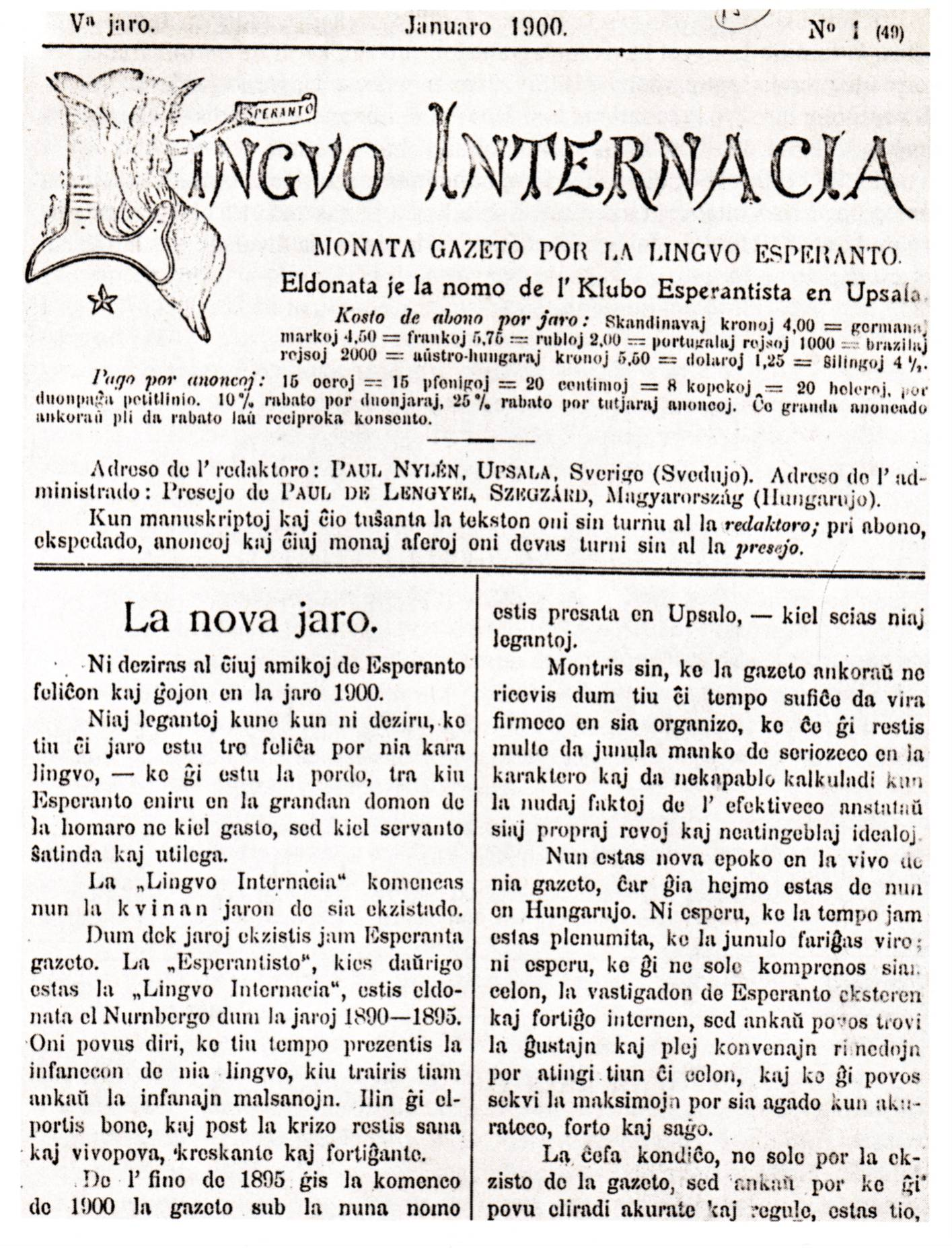
- January 1900 edition of Lingvo Internacia
- Editor: Paul Fruictier; Théophile Cart
- Frequency: Monthly
- Publisher: Klubo Esperantista
- Founded: 1895
- First issue: December 1895
- Final issue: 1914
- Country: Sweden
- Based in: Uppsala
- Language: Esperanto

Lingvo Internacia (English: International Language) was an Esperanto periodical, published in Uppsala by Klubo Esperantista from 1895 to 1914. It was the second Esperanto periodical, following La Esperantisto (1889–1895). Lingvo Internacia was the central Esperanto publication in the years leading up to World War I, accompanied by La Revuo (1906–1914).

== See also ==
- History of Esperanto
- List of Esperanto periodicals

== Digitization ==
The biblioteko.esperanto.se provides a nicer interface for the digitized images hosted on BitArkivo.org.
