= Richard H. Geoghegan =

Anglo-American philologist and early Esperantist

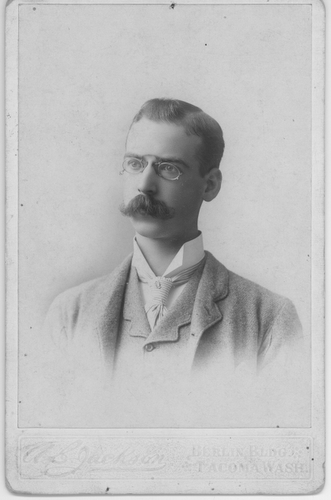
- Geoghegan, c. 1895
- Born: 8 January 1866; Birkenhead, Cheshire, England
- Died: 27 October 1943 (aged 77); Fairbanks, Alaska, U.S.
- Occupation: Court stenographer
- Known for: Accomplished linguist; first Esperantist from the English-speaking world

Richard Henry Geoghegan (/ˈɡeɪɡən/ GAY-gən; 8 January 1866 – 27 October 1943) was an Anglo-American philologist and the first known Esperantist from the English-speaking world. As a young man, he emigrated to the United States, first living in Washington state and then in the Alaska Territory.

== Early life and education ==
Richard Henry Geoghegan was born on 8 January 1866 in Birkenhead, Cheshire, England, Britain.

When he was three years old, Geoghegan suffered a fall on the stairs at home, as a result of which he was crippled for life, walking with difficulty and often with the help of a cane. From an early age he displayed extraordinary intellectual abilities, especially in the learning of languages. Around the age of 17, he became interested in Oriental writing systems and entered the University of Oxford, in January 1884, to study Chinese. There he showed himself to be an outstanding student, twice receiving scholarship awards, but he never obtained a degree. At Oxford, Chinese remained a non-diploma field of study until 1936.

== Esperanto activities ==
In the autumn of 1887, when the language Esperanto had just appeared, Geoghegan read an article about it and immediately wrote to the language's creator, L. L. Zamenhof, in Latin. Zamenhof sent Geoghegan a German edition of his Unua Libro. Having learned the language from this book in short order, a while later Geoghegan received from Zamenhof the first copies of the same book in an English translation by Warsaw's J. St. (pseudonym of Julian Steinhaus). Geoghegan warned Zamenhof that this translation was a mess, and it would only make a laughingstock of Esperanto in the English-speaking world. Subsequently, Zamenhof asked Geoghegan to produce a more suitable translation himself, which he did. The translation by Steinhaus was withdrawn, and in 1889 Geoghegan's was published. In the Unua Adresaro, an early directory of supporters of Esperanto, Geoghegan appears as number 264.

== Emigration to Washington State ==
Geoghegan left Oxford at the end of 1887 and was an instructor of classical languages in London until 1891, when he—along with his widowed mother and siblings—emigrated to the village of Eastsound in the northwestern United States. Not finding an opportunity to support himself in the fishing/farming economy there, in 1893 he went to Tacoma, in the state of Washington, where he worked as a stenographer for an Anglican bishop, and later in the same capacity for the English and Japanese consulates.

He founded, together with two or three other linguists, the Washington State Philological Society, and contributed papers on the perceived relationship between ancient “oriental” and American writing systems and on calendar systems. Meanwhile, he unsuccessfully sought a position as professor of Chinese language at the University of Washington in Seattle, and the early days of 1903 he accepted an invitation by the federal judge James Wickersham to come to Alaska as a court stenographer. In 1905 he was elected as the first president of the newly formed American Esperanto Association, but he was unable to preside due to his remote location.

== Relocation to Alaska ==
Despite the rigorous climate and rough gold mining environment, the informal Alaskan lifestyle and the opportunity to study firsthand Aleut and other native languages of the region appealed to Geoghegan. Except for the year 1905, which he spent in Seattle (where the Seattle Esperanto Society was founded primarily under his influence and that of his friend, William G. Adams), and 1914, when he traveled through the western United States and Japan, Geoghegan remained a resident of Alaska until his death on 27 October 1943. Because of his physical handicaps, Geoghegan was of a retiring nature and remained single until 1916. In that year, infatuated with Ella Joseph-de-Saccrist, he married her, but only secretly, under the advice of friends, because of racial prejudices that existed at that time: Ella, who came from Martinique, was known as a black. She died in 1936. (This explains why in many biographies one reads that he never married.)

Geoghegan lived simply, often in primitive log cabins, at various addresses in the city of Fairbanks. He always remained faithful to Esperanto, to whose Lingva Komitato (Language Committee) he was elected immediately upon its formation in 1905. For him, however, Esperanto was mainly a written language. The first person with whom he actually spoke it was Wilhelm Heinrich Trompeter, who visited him in Eastsound in the 1890s. His valuable book collection, including many original letters from Zamenhof and other pioneers, as well as other rare artifacts about little known—mainly oriental—languages, were destroyed when the family home in Eastsound burned down in 1906. Probably Geoghegan's most noteworthy linguistic contribution was the compilation of a dictionary and grammar for the Aleut language of the Alaskan islands, on which he labored from the time of his arrival in Valdez, Alaska, en 1903. It was finally published only after his death, in 1944, and remains even today the principal English language work on the subject.

== Publications ==
=== In and about Esperanto ===
- Dr. Esperanto's International Language, Introduction & Complete Grammar, Warsaw, 1889. English translation of Unua Libro.
- The Universal Language "Esperanto". Complete Instruction Book with two Vocabularies, Nurnberg, 1892. Translated by Geoghegan after the Russian of Dr. L.L. Samenhof
  (Second edition, Upsala, 1898)
- A few Words on the international language "Esperanto", Upsala, 1898. Translated by R. H. Geoghegan, after the Russian by Dr. L. Zamenhof
- Grammar and exercises of the international language Esperanto, London, 1904. Adapted from the French of Louis de Beaufront by Richard H. Geoghegan

=== About the Aleut language and other topics ===
- Geoghegan, Richard H. (1906), "Some notes on the ideograms of the Chinese and the Central American calendars", The Monist, 16 (4), Chicago: 562–596, doi:10.5840/monist190616411
- The Aleut language: the elements of Aleut grammar with a dictionary in two parts containing basic vocabularies of Aleut and English, Washington, D.C.: United States Department of the Interior, 1944 Published posthumously.
  (Second edition, Seattle, Washington, 1966)

Geoghegan also compiled the foreign language sections (mostly Russian) of: Wickersham, James (1927), A Bibliography of Alaskan Literature, 1724-1927, Fairbanks, Alaska

The letters, diaries, and other papers of Richard Geoghegan are in the Richard Geoghegan Collection, Rasmuson Library, University of Alaska, Fairbanks.
