= La Esperantisto =

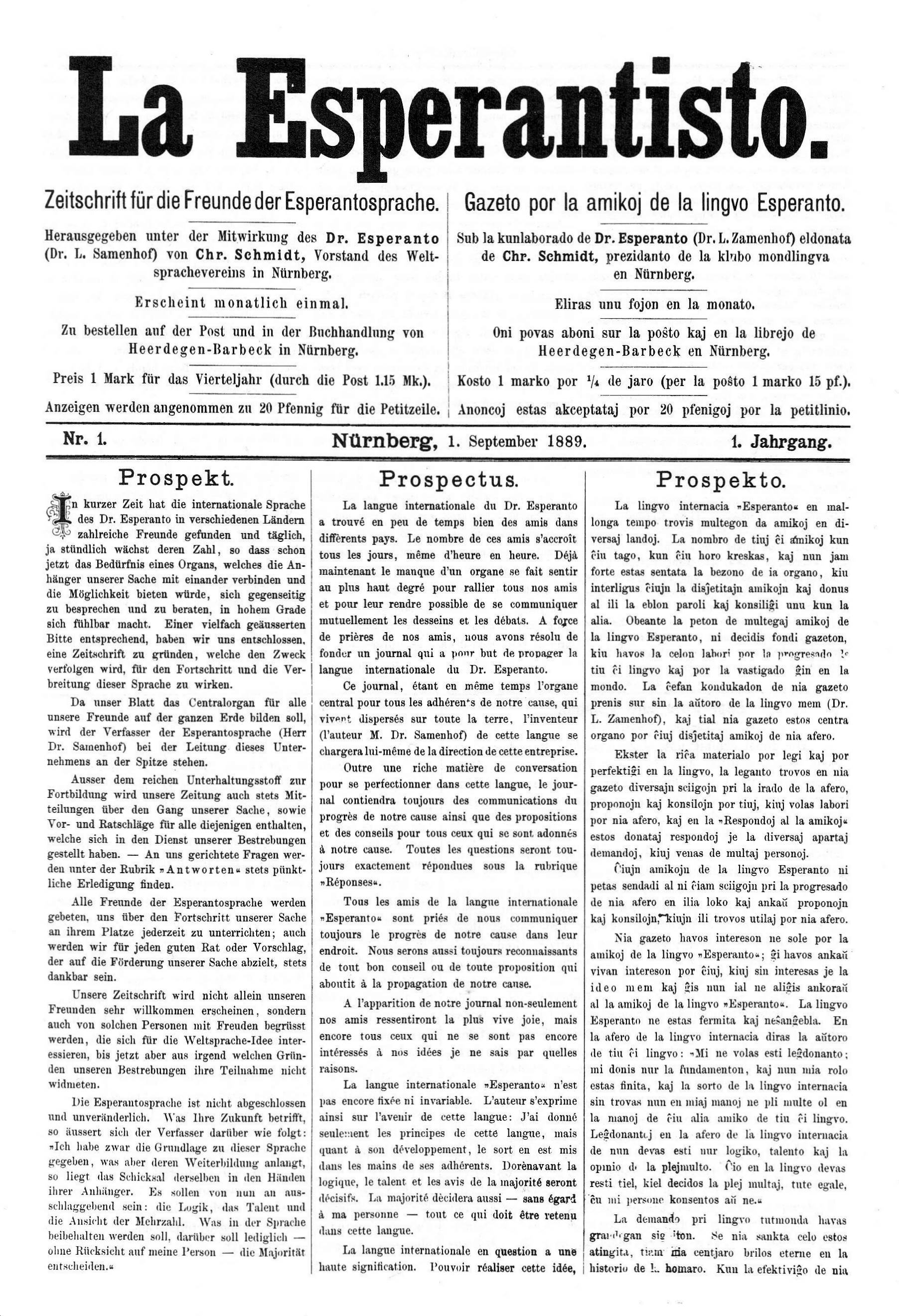
- First edition of La Esperantisto, published on September 1, 1889
- Editor: L. L. Zamenhof
- Publisher: Christian Schmidt (1889–91); Wilhelm Trompeter (1891–95)
- Founder: L. L. Zamenhof
- Founded: 1889
- First issue: September 1, 1889
- Final issue: 1895
- Based in: Nuremberg, Germany
- Language: Esperanto

La Esperantisto (English: The Esperantist), stylised as La Esperantisto., was the first Esperanto periodical, published from 1889 to 1895. L. L. Zamenhof started it in order to provide reading material for the then-nascent Esperanto community.

Its original publisher was Christian Schmidt, president of the Nuremberg International Language Club, the first Esperanto club. Later, it was published by Wilhelm Trompeter, a major financial backer of the early Esperanto movement.

== History ==
L. L. Zamenhof first introduced Esperanto to the public in 1887 with the publication of Unua Libro, followed by Dua Libro in 1888. He began to receive letters from individuals expressing interest in the project, prompting him to provide reading material for the nascent Esperanto community. He first attempted to publish a weekly newspaper for this purpose in 1888 titled La Internaciulo (The Internationalist), but he failed to find a publisher.

After modifying his idea to the monthly La Esperantisto, Zamenhof found a publisher in Christian Schmidt, president of the Nuremberg International Language Club, the first Esperanto club in the world based in Nuremberg, Germany. The club had previously been a club devoted to Volapük but officially switched its dedication to Esperanto at its general meeting on December 18, 1888, having lost hope in the viability of Volapük. Schmidt published the periodical until 1891, when he ceased publication due to disagreements with Zamenhof. That same year, Wilhelm Heinrich Trompeter took over as publisher.

La Esperantisto was published monthly. Its number of subscribers peaked in 1893 at 889.

In January 1894, Zamenhof proposed a radical reform to Esperanto that proved to be unpopular and led many to unsubscribe from La Esperantisto. He later retracted the proposed reform and referred to 1894 as a "wasted year".

Zamenhof then translated and published part of Leo Tolstoy's essay "Reason or Faith" in La Esperantisto, which led to the Russian Empire banning the publication for advocating civil disobedience, resulting in hundreds of subscribers lost. Tolstoy himself successfully appealed the ban in May 1895, but it was too late to revive the journal and its publication was permanently cancelled soon thereafter.

Lingvo Internacia, a monthly Esperanto periodical, emerged in Sweden in December 1895 and largely fulfilled the role of La Esperantisto after its cancellation.

Although the periodical was short-lived, it played an important role in the history of Esperanto, serving as a model publication for future periodicals and providing an early basis of community among early Esperantists.

== See also ==
- List of Esperanto periodicals
