= Fundamento de Esperanto =

1905 book by L. L. Zamenhof, describing the basic grammar and vocabulary of Esperanto

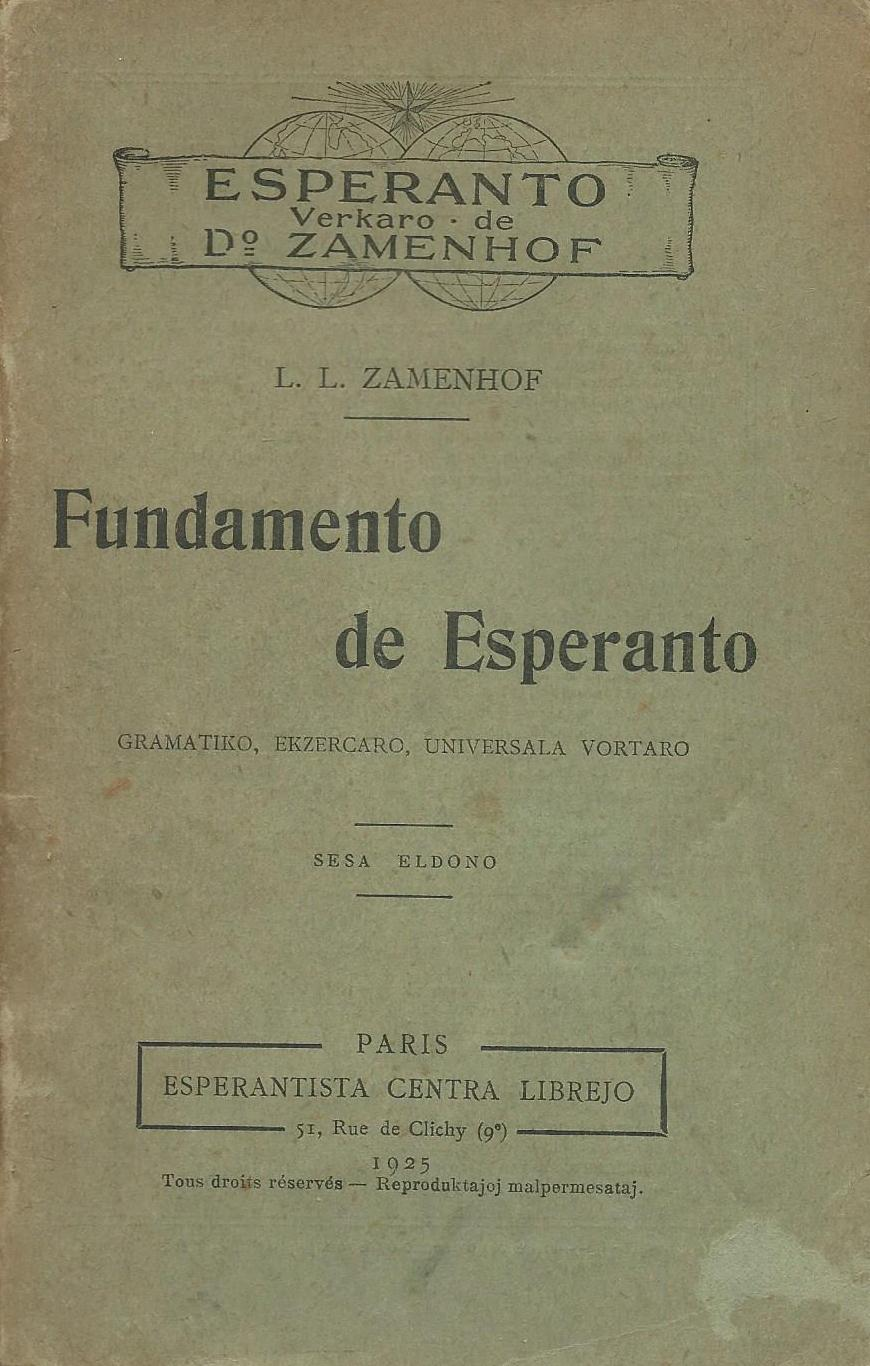
- Foundation of Esperanto: Grammar, Exercises, Universal Dictionary . . .
- Author: L. L. Zamenhof
- Language: English, Esperanto, French, German, Polish, Russian
- Subject: Esperanto
- Published: 1905

Fundamento de Esperanto (English: Foundation of Esperanto) is a 1905 book by L. L. Zamenhof, in which the author explains the basic grammar rules and vocabulary that constitute the basis of the constructed language Esperanto. On August 9, 1905, it was made the only obligatory authority over the language by the Declaration of Boulogne at the first World Esperanto Congress. Much of the content of the book is a reproduction of content from Zamenhof's earlier works, particularly Unua Libro.

== Content ==
Fundamento de Esperanto consists of four parts: a foreword, a grammar section, a collection of exercises, and a dictionary. With the exception of the foreword, almost everything in the Fundamento comes directly from Zamenhof's earlier works, primarily Unua Libro. Esperanto, however, underwent a minor change in 1888 in Aldono al la Dua Libro, in which Zamenhof changed the ending of the temporal correlatives (when, then, always, sometimes, never) from -ian to -iam, so the Esperanto of the Fundamento is slightly different than that of Unua Libro.

The grammar and dictionary sections of the Fundamento are in five national languages: French, English, German, Russian, and Polish.

== Declaration of Boulogne ==
Fundamento de Esperanto was made the official source of Esperanto in the fourth article of the Declaration of Boulogne at the first World Esperanto Congress in Boulogne-sur-Mer, France:

The only basis of the Esperanto language binding on all Esperantists, which no one has the right to change, is the little work Foundation of Esperanto. If anyone deviates from the rules and models given in the said work, he can never justify himself with the words "thus desires or advises the author of Esperanto". Each Esperantist has the right to express any idea, which cannot be conveniently expressed by the material found in the Foundation of Esperanto, in such a manner as he finds most correct, as is done in every other language. However, for the unity of the language for all Esperantists it is recommended to imitate as much as possible the style that is found in the works of the creator of Esperanto, who has worked the most for and in Esperanto and knows best its spirit.

Equal to the Fundamento are the Oficialaj Aldonoj (Official Additions). To date, there have been ten Official Additions. The foreword of the Fundamento states:

Some time from now, when many of the new words have completely stabilized, some authoritative institution shall put them into an official dictionary, as 'Additions to the Fundamento'.

That authoritative institution is the Akademio de Esperanto.
