= Proto-Esperanto =

Esperanto prior to Unua Libro

- Lingwe uniwersala, Lingvo universala
- Created by: L. L. Zamenhof
- Date: 1878–1881
- Setting and usage: international auxiliary language
- Users: None
- Purpose: Constructed language: international auxiliary language; Proto-Esperanto
- Writing system: Latin

Language codes
- ISO 639-3: –
- Glottolog: None

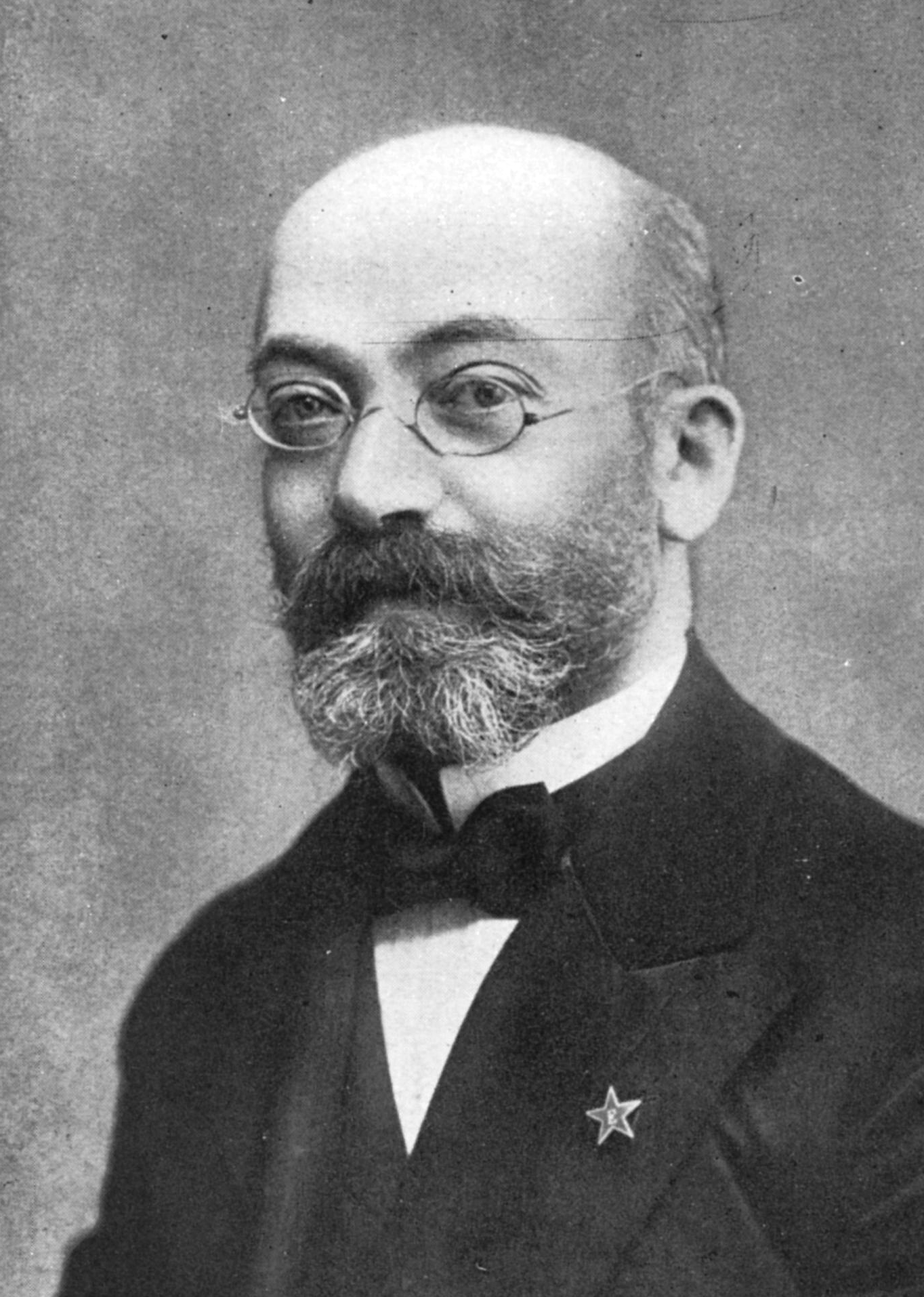

Proto-Esperanto (Esperanto: Pra-Esperanto) is the modern term for any of the stages in the evolution of L. L. Zamenhof's language project, prior to the publication of Unua Libro in 1887.

== The Neo-Jewish language of ca. 1879 ==
The precursors to the Esperanto alphabet can be found in Zamenhof's proposal for the use of Latin script in his Litvish-based unified Yiddish project (Esperanto: novjuda lingvo, Russian: новоеврейский язык "Neo-Jewish language"). The consonant letters are equivalent to those of modern Esperanto, apart from lacking a letter for [dʒ]. The diacritic, however, is an acute: ć, h́, ś, ź (the last for Esperanto ĵ ). The vowel letters are the same apart from there being no ŭ. Their values are similar to Esperanto in the Litvish reading, with the addition of oŭ, though Poylish reading is divergent. There was in addition a letter ě for the schwa, which only appeared before the consonants l and n and was replaced by e in some circumstances. The circumflex is used, but indicates that a letter is not pronounced: e.g. ês iẑ is pronounced /si/. The following is a sample, with Litvish and Poylish readings:

Neo-Jewish:

Klejne zah́ěn zet men beser fun-nontěn, greuse – fun-vajtěn. Ous kale, vider mojd.

Litvish reading:

Klejne zaĥ(e)n zet men beser fun nont(e)n, grejse – fun vajt(e)n. Oŭs kale, vider mojd.

Poylish reading:

Klajne zaĥ(e)n zejt men bejser fin nunt(e)r, groose – fin vat(e)r. Ojs [~ os] kale, vider mod.

== The Lingwe uniwersala of 1878 ==
As a child, Zamenhof had the idea to introduce an international auxiliary language for communication between different nationalities. He originally wanted to revive some form of simplified Latin or Greek, but as he grew older he came to believe that it would be better to create a new language for his purpose. During his teenage years he worked on a language project until he thought it was ready for public demonstration. On December 17, 1878 (about one year before the first publication of Volapük), Zamenhof celebrated his 19th birthday and the birth of the language with some friends, who liked the project. Zamenhof himself called his language Lingwe Uniwersala (Universal Language).

W is used for v. Otherwise, all modern Esperanto letters are attested apart from those with diacritics (ĉ, ĝ, ĥ, ĵ, ŝ, ŭ). Known verb forms are present -á, imperative -ó, infinitive -are. Nouns were marked by -e in the singular and -es in the plural; the article was singular la and plural las. It appears that there was no accusative case, and that stress was as in modern Esperanto, except when marked, as in -á and -ó.

Only four lines of the Lingwe uniwersala stage of the language from 1878 remain, from an early song that Zamenhof composed:

Malamikete de las nacjes,
Kadó, kadó, jam temp' está;
La tot' homoze in familje
Konunigare so debá.

— L.L.Zamenhof
Translation:

Enmity of nations,
Fall, fall, the time has come! [lit. "already it is time!"]
All humanity in a family
Must unite.

In modern Esperanto, this would be,

Malamikeco de la nacioj,
Falu, falu, jam temp' estas;
La tuta homaro en familion
Unuiĝi [= kununuigi sin] devas.

Jam temp' está remains an idiom in modern Esperanto, an allusion to this song.

== The Lingvo universala of 1881 ==
While at university, Zamenhof handed his work over to his father, Mordechai, for safe-keeping until he had completed his medical studies. His father, not understanding the ideas of his son and perhaps anticipating problems from the Tsarist police, burned the work. Zamenhof did not discover this until he returned from university in 1881, at which point he restarted his project. A sample from this second phase of the language is this extract of a letter from 1881:

Ma plej kara [ami] miko, kvan ma plekulpa plumo faktidźas tiranno pu to. Mo poté de cen taj brivoj kluri, ke sciigoj de [tuc fuc] fu-ći specco debé[j] blessi tal fradral kordol; mo vel vidé tol jam ...

Modern: Mia plej kara amiko, neniam mia senkulpa plumo fariĝus tirano por vi. Mi povas de cent viaj leteroj konkludi, kiel sciigoj de tiu-ĉi speco devas vundi vian fratan koron; mi kvazaŭ vidas vin jam ...

(My dearest friend, never (lit. 'when') would my innocent pen become a tyrant for you. From a hundred of your letters I can conclude that announcements of this kind must wound your brotherly heart; I [can] already see you thus...)

By this time the letter v had replaced w for the [v] sound; verbal inflection for person and number had been dropped; the nominal plural was -oj in place of -es (as well as adjectival -a and adverbial -e); and the noun cases were down to the current two (though a genitive -es survives today in the correlatives). The accusative case suffix was -l, but in many cases was only used on pronouns:

Ful-ći rudźo e ful-ći fiaro debá kini la princaŭ (Tiun-ĉi rozon kaj tiun-ĉi najtingalon devadis ricevi la princino) 'The princess needed to receive this rose and this nightingale'.

In addition to the stronger Slavic flavor of the orthography compared to the modern language (ć, dź, h́, ś, ź for ĉ, ĝ, ĥ, ŝ, ĵ ), the present and past imperfective verb forms still had final stress:

present tense -è, imperfect -à, preterite -u, future -uj, conditional -as, jussive -ò and infinitive -i.

The pronouns ended in a nominal o (or adjectival a for possessives: mo "I", ma "my"), but there were other differences as well, including a conflation of 'he' and 'it':

1881 pronouns
	singular	plural
1st person	mo	no
2nd person	to	vo
3rd masc./neut.	ro	po
3rd feminine	śo	po
3rd reflexive	so	

In addition, there was indefinite o 'one'.

The correlatives were similarly close, though it is not clear if there was a distinction between indefinite and relative forms (modern i- and ki-; these may have corresponded to kv- and k-) and no possessive forms are known:

	-o	-u	-a	-e	-al	-el	-am	-om
ti-	fo	fu	fa	fi	fej	fe	fan	
ki- / i-	kvo, ko	kvu, ku	kva			kve, ke	kvan, kan	kom
ĉi-	ćio	ćiu		ćii			ćian	
neni-	fio	fiu					fian	

The last row was evidently pronounced as fj-.

Esperanto at this stage had a consonantal ablaut in verbs, with a voiceless consonant for an attempt at something, and a voiced consonant for success. For example, aŭti to listen (for), aŭdi to hear; trofi to look for, trovi to find; prufi to argue (a point), pruvi to prove. Traces of this remain in a few pairs of words such as pesi 'to weigh (an item)' and pezi 'to weigh (have weight)' (cf. their derivatives pesilo 'scales' & pezilo 'a weight').

== Transition to the modern Esperanto of 1887 ==
Zamenhof refined his ideas for the language for the next several years. Most of his refinements came through translation of literature and poetry in other languages. The final stress in the verb conjugations was rejected in favour of always stressing the second-last vowel, and the old plural -s on nouns became a marker of finite tenses on verbs, with an imperfect -es remaining until just before publication. The Slavic-style acute diacritics became circumflexes to avoid overt appearances of nationalism, and the new bases of the letters ĵ, ĝ (for former ź, dź) helped preserve the appearance of Romance and Germanic vocabulary.

In 1887 Zamenhof finalized his tinkering with the publication of the Unua Libro (First Book), which contained the Esperanto language as we know it today. In a letter to Nikolai Borovko he later wrote,

I've worked for six years perfecting and testing the language, when in the year 1878 it had already seemed completely ready to me.

— Zamenhof

== Later proposals by Zamenhof ==
By 1894, multiple proposals to change Esperanto had appeared. Zamenhof was pressured to incorporate them into Esperanto, and in response reluctantly presented a reformed Esperanto in 1893. A vote was put to the members of the Esperanto League, including all subscribers to La Esperantisto, and the proposal was voted down 60% opposed to 5% in favor, with a further 35% wanting different reforms.

== See also ==
- Arcaicam Esperantom – a constructed fictitious 'archaic' version of Esperanto.
