= Declaration of Boulogne =

Declaration of several premises of the Esperanto movement

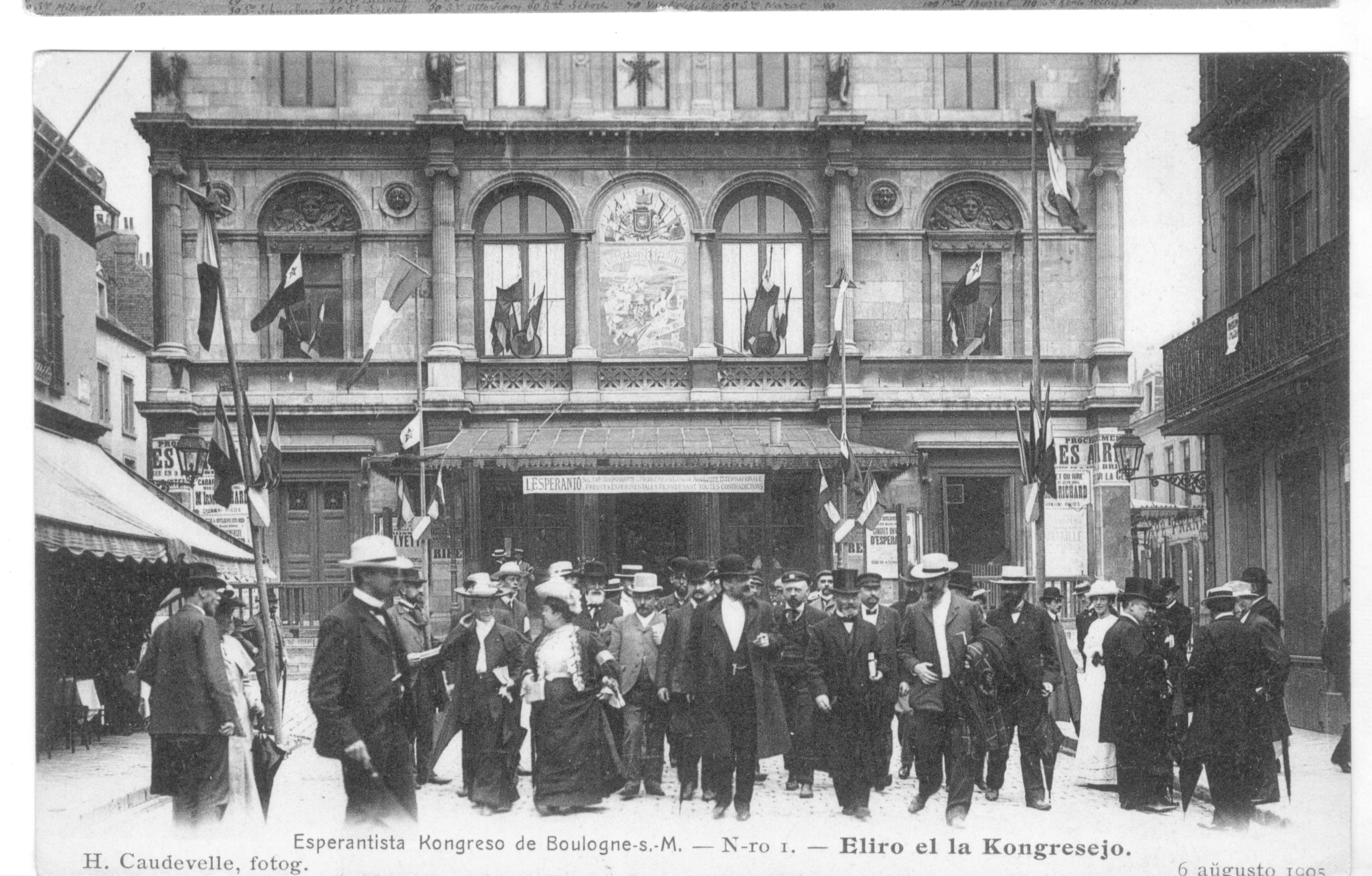
- Zamenhof and other attendees leaving the first World Esperanto Congress
- Original title: Deklaracio pri la esenco de Esperantismo
- Created: 1905
- Ratified: August 1905
- Location: Boulogne-sur-Mer, France
- Author(s): L. L. Zamenhof
- Purpose: Establishing the Esperanto movement

Full text
- Boulogne Declaration at Wikisource

The Declaration on the Essence of Esperantism (Esperanto: Deklaracio pri la esenco de Esperantismo), commonly referred to as the Declaration of Boulogne (Bulonja Deklaracio), is a historic document that establishes several important premises for the Esperanto movement. The Declaration was written by L. L. Zamenhof and ratified in 1905 by the attendees of the first World Esperanto Congress, held in Boulogne-sur-Mer, France.

== Content ==
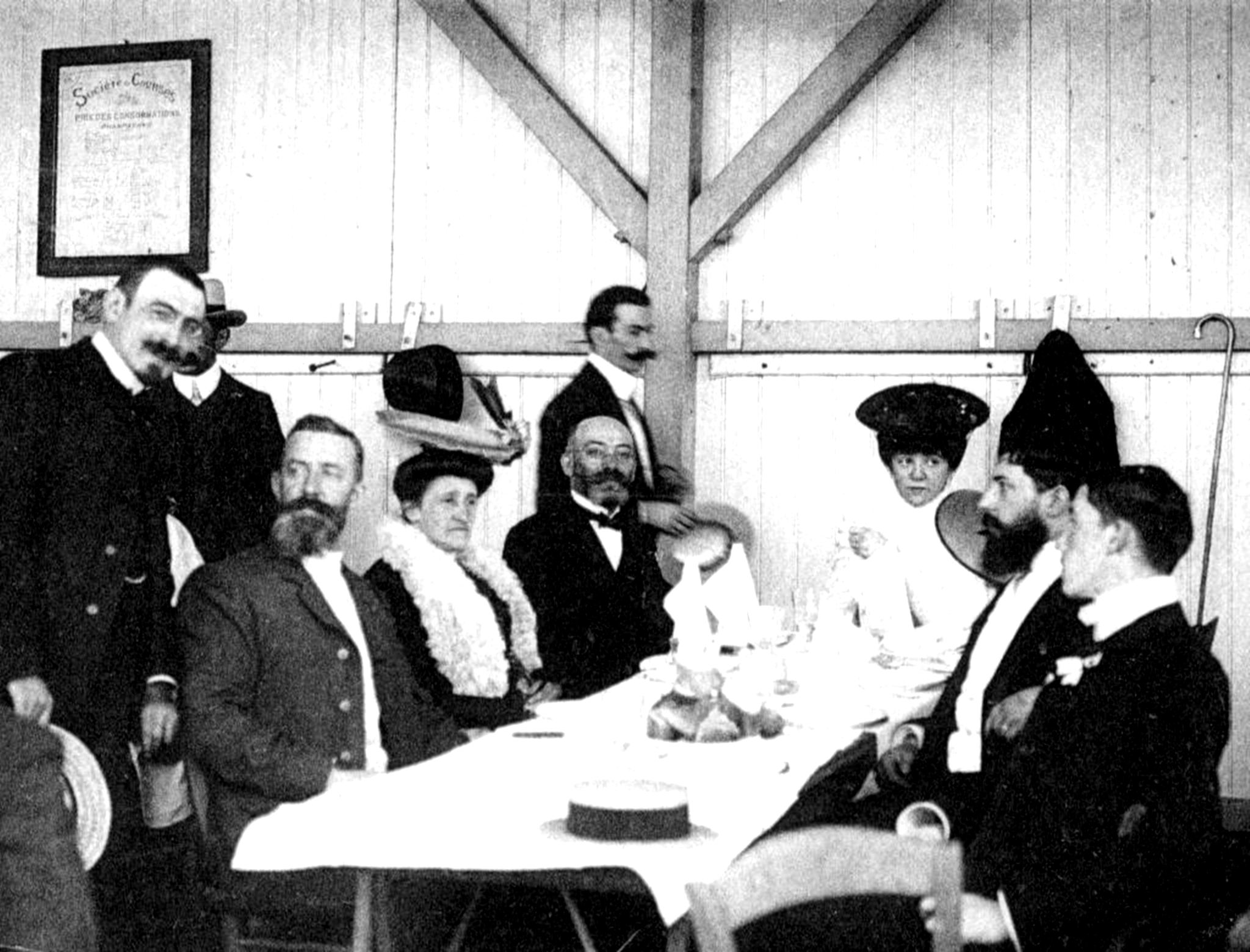
The Zamenhof and Michaux families at the first World Esperanto Congress

The Declaration of Boulogne consists of an introduction and five points.

In the introduction, Zamenhof clarifies that the five points of the Declaration are necessary to establish because many people misunderstand the nature of the Esperanto movement. The five points are largely in response to these widely held misconceptions.

1. Esperantism is a movement that supports the introduction of an international auxiliary language (IAL). No further meaning can be attached to it. It is politically, religiously, and morally neutral, and it does not seek to replace any existing languages, only to supplement them.
2. It recognizes that Esperanto is the most realistic IAL that exists, and they work to further it based on this goal.
3. Esperanto belongs to no one. Anyone can use it for any reason they like.
4. Fundamento de Esperanto is the single, perpetual obligatory authority over Esperanto, and it cannot be modified. Otherwise, Esperanto depends on no legal authority, neither a governing body nor an individual, including Zamenhof himself. If a linguistic matter is not covered in Fundamento, it is up to the individual on how to handle the matter.
5. An Esperantist is a fluent Esperanto speaker. Involvement in the Esperanto community is encouraged but not required.
