= Esperanto movement =

Social movement concerning Esperanto

The Esperanto movement, less commonly referred to as Esperantism (Esperanto: Esperantismo), is a movement to disseminate the use of the planned international language Esperanto. The movement does not aim to supplant national languages but merely to supplement them. The movement is sometimes used to describe all speakers of Esperanto including their culture.

== Politics ==
Esperanto has been placed in a few proposed political situations. The most popular of these is the former minor party Europe–Democracy–Esperanto, which aims to establish Esperanto as the official language of the European Union. Grin's Report, published in 2005 by François Grin found that the use of the English language as the lingua franca within the European Union costs billions annually and significantly benefits English-speaking countries financially. The report considered a scenario where Esperanto would be the lingua franca and found that it would have many advantages, particularly economically speaking, as well as ideologically.

== See also ==
- Esperanto club
- Raumism
