= President of the Universal Esperanto Association =

Leader of international language group

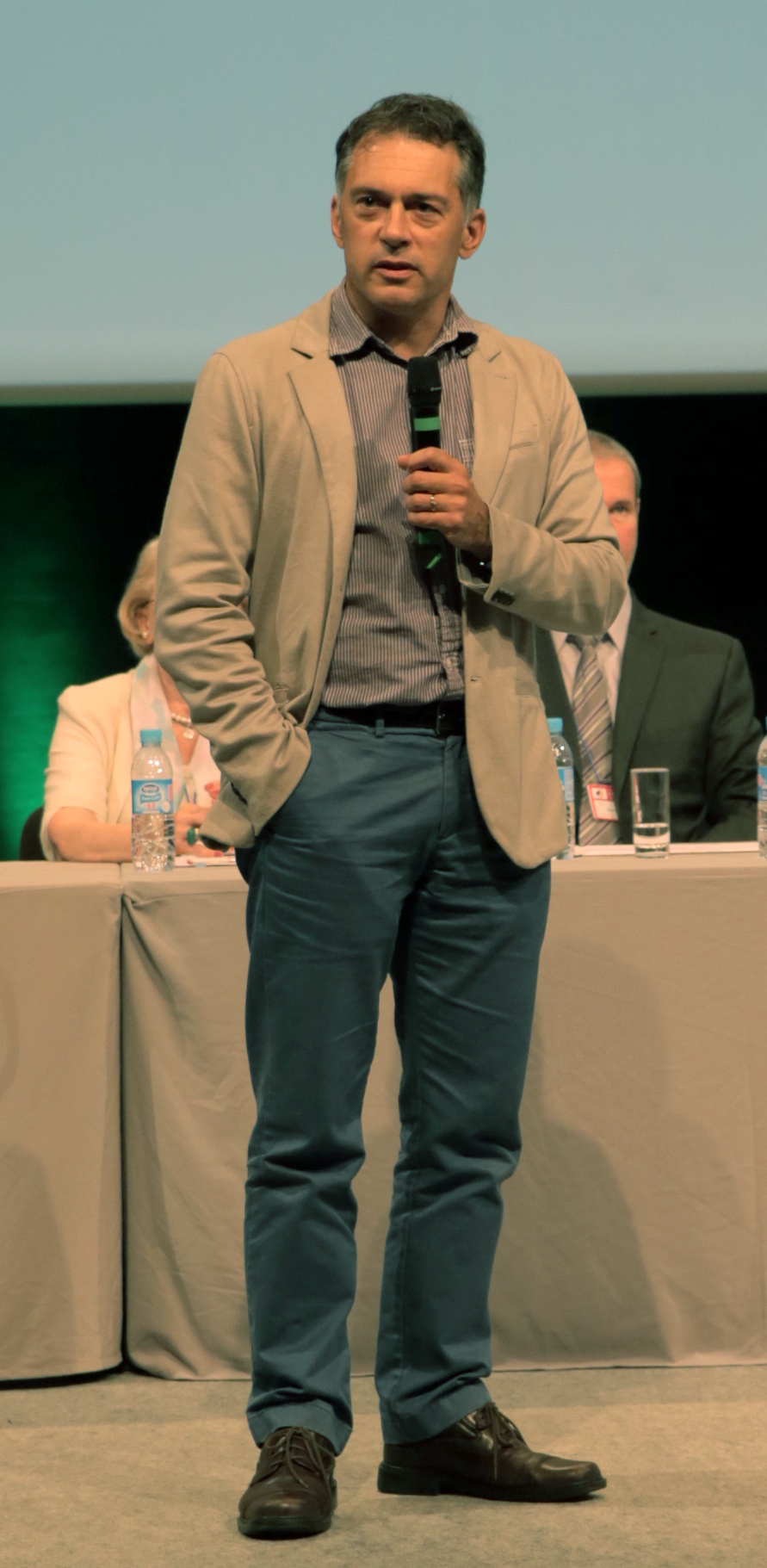
Mark Fettes of Canada was President of the World Esperanto Association from 2013 to 2019.

The President of the Universal Esperanto Association (Esperanto: Universala Esperanto-Asocio, UEA) is the elected leader of the Universal Esperanto Association and the chief executive of the UEA steering committee (Estraro).

== History ==
Prior to 1920 the President of the UEA governed the UEA Central Committee (Komitato), because no separation yet existed between the Estraro and the Komitato. Over the decades the functioning of the presidency remained unchanged, and the president's relationship with the other Estraro members and the UEA general secretary depended on the times and on his or her nature, with correspondence between the president and the general secretary providing practical guidance for the UEA. According to the plan of Ivo Lapenna (1955), the president was to have mostly an executive role, whereas the general secretary would perform everyday duties, but this system was followed only during the time when Lapenna himself was general secretary (1955–1964).

From 1936 to 1947 the majority of the organized Esperanto movement left the UEA, headquartered in Switzerland, to establish the rival International Esperanto League with offices in Britain. In 1947 the two groups reunited. Because Louis Bastien, the sole IEL president, had previously been UEA president, his name appears here integrated into the main list.

== Chronology ==
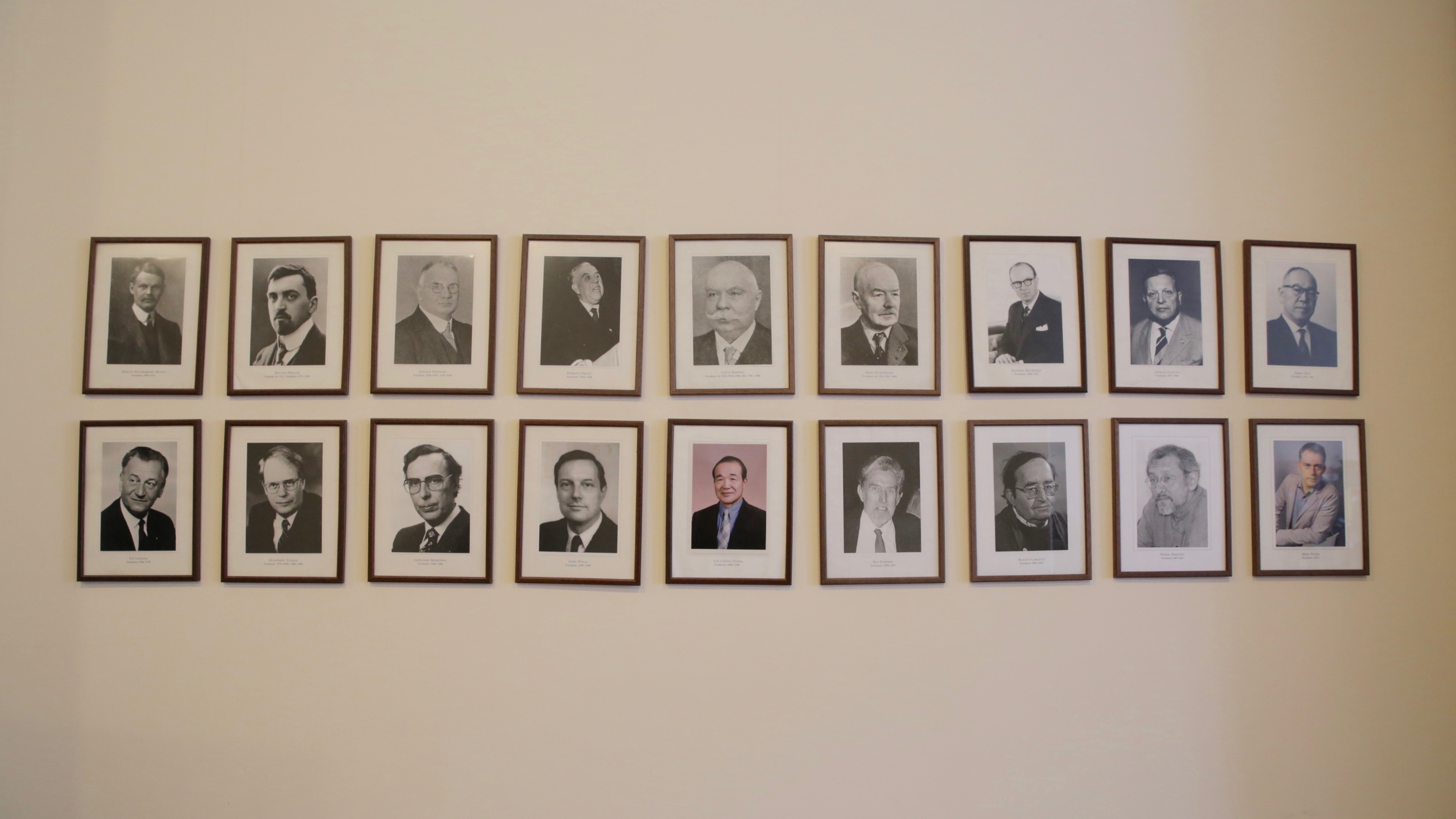

=== Swiss period ===
- 1908–1916: Harold Bolingbroke Mudie (United Kingdom)
- 1916–1919: (vacant)
- 1919–1920: Hector Hodler (Switzerland)
- 1920–1924: Eduard Stettler (Switzerland)
- 1924–1928: Edmond Privat (Switzerland)
- 1928–1934: Eduard Stettler (Switzerland)
- 1934–1936: Louis Bastien (France)
- 1936–1941: Karl Max Liniger (Switzerland)
- 1941–1947: Hans Hermann Kürsteiner (Switzerland)

=== British period ===
- 1947–1947: (Internacia Esperanto-Ligo) Louis Bastien (France)
- 1947–1956: Ernfrid Malmgren (Sweden)

=== Dutch period ===
- 1956–1960: Giorgio Canuto (Italy)
- 1960–1962: Harry W. Holmes (acting) (United Kingdom)
- 1962–1964: Hideo Yagi (Japan)
- 1964–1964: Harry W. Holmes (acting) (United Kingdom)
- 1964–1974: Ivo Lapenna (United Kingdom)
- 1974–1980: Humphrey R. Tonkin (United States)
- 1980–1986: Grégoire Maertens (Belgium)
- 1986–1989: Humphrey R. Tonkin (United States)
- 1989–1995: John C. Wells (United Kingdom)
- 1995–1998: Lee Chong-Yeong (South Korea)
- 1998–2001: Keppel Enderby (Australia)
- 2001–2007: Renato Corsetti (Italy)
- 2007–2013: Probal Dasgupta (India)
- 2013–2019: Mark Fettes (Canada)
- 2019–2025: Duncan Charters (United States)
- 2025-present: Fernando Maia Jr. (Brazil)
