= International Esperanto League =

The International Esperanto League (Esperanto: Internacia Esperanto-Ligo) was for 11 years the largest and most important neutral Esperanto federation, reuniting in 1947 with the Universal Esperanto Association from which it had broken away in 1936.

== Helsinki system ==
At the UEA's founding in 1908, the question arose of how the UEA would work together with national Esperanto societies, some of which perceived the UEA as a competitor that might lure away their most active members. The UEA reached a loose cooperation agreement with the national federations in 1913, but it was of mostly symbolic character. Meeting at the 1922 World Esperanto Congress in Helsinki, delegates worked out a system which was to govern the Esperanto movement from 1923 till 1932. The Helsinki system divided each country's individual membership contributions between a national federation on the one hand and the UEA on the other and determined the membership of an international central committee. This committee decided on the use of funds for general tasks of the Esperanto movement, such as lobbying of international organizations.

== Cologne agreement ==
With the rise in nationalism, by 1932 most of the separate national organizations had announced that they wanted a greater role in the UEA structure. After some considerable confrontation the 1933 World Congress in Cologne brought into being a "new UEA". The World Esperanto Association would become an umbrella organization with an international council or parliament, the vast majority of whose members would be delegates representing dues-paying national Esperanto federations. At-large Esperantists residing in countries without national Esperanto bodies would be entitled to elect a smaller number of delegates as well.

The new election system weakened the traditional internationalist outlook of the UEA, removed from office the idealist Esperanto movement leaders like Edmond Privat, Johannes Waldemar Karsch and Andrei Cseh, and turned the UEA into a loose confederation of national Esperanto associations with conflicting nationalist ideologies. The German Esperanto Association not only tried to accommodate itself to the Nazi regime but even adopted its racist theories, expelled its Jewish members and minimized the extent of Hitler's human rights abuses.

== Esperanto's schism ==
To avoid financial catastrophe resulting from the high cost of maintaining a Geneva office, in the spring of 1936 the UEA Central Office announced plans to move its headquarters to London.

Leaders of the Swiss Esperanto Society challenged the decision in Geneva district court (Genfer Amtsgericht ) on the grounds that by the terms of the UEA constitution its headquarters was to be in Switzerland, and delayed the move for a year. By March 1937 most national federations (except for Spain, still in the throes of the civil war, and Switzerland) had left the UEA and affiliated with the newly established International Esperanto League (IEL). The remaining Geneva UEA, with the support of Lidia Zamenhof, the daughter of L. L. Zamenhof, taking a courageous stand against Nazi Germany and their co-opting of the German Esperanto movement, spoke out against the regime and made efforts to help Jews desperate to flee persecution in Germany.

== Return to ideals ==
After the Second World War the German Esperanto Association purged itself of its Nazi past and of members like Anton Vogt, a Nazi party member who in 1935 had been UEA vice-president. While a resolution put forward by Dr. Ivo Lapenna on behalf of eight national Esperanto associations to condemn fascism did not pass at the Bern Congress, in part because of fears of having to take sides in the incipient Cold War, the German association dedicated itself to anti-fascism and pacifism. Anti-fascist sentiment was very popular among Esperantists; after all, Nazi Germany had eventually prohibited Esperanto in the Third Reich despite all the prewar attempts to meld the incompatible ideals of Esperantism and Nazi ideology.

By now atrophied to a shadow of its former self, the leadership of the Geneva UEA realized that an organization independent of the successful IEL had no future. Thus, at the first postwar Congress in 1947, they decided to reunify with the IEL under the old name of Universal Esperanto Association (UEA).
