= Mark Fettes =

Canadian Esperantist

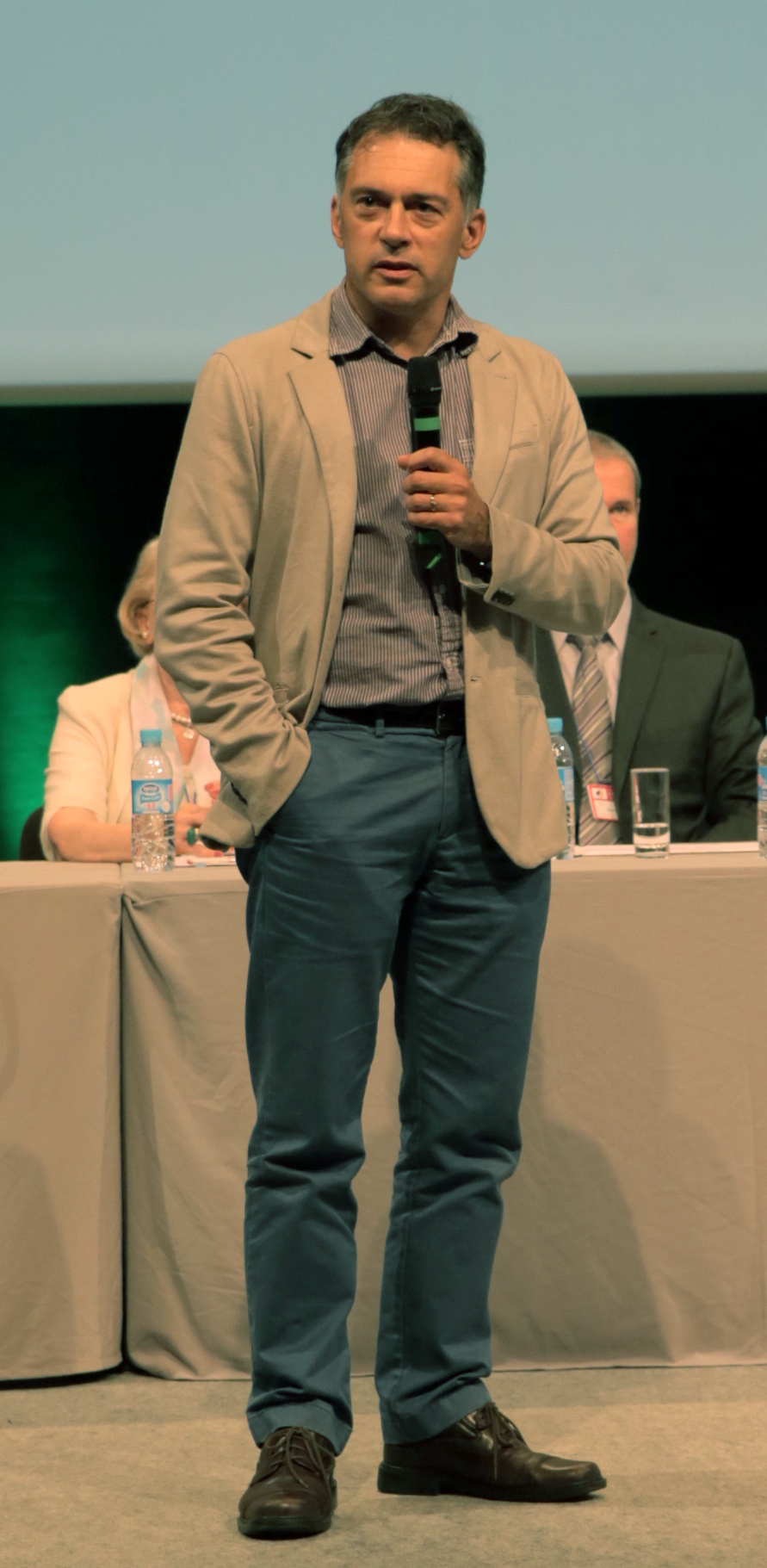
- Mark Fettes during the 100th World Congress of Esperanto, Lille (France), 2015

President of World Esperanto Association
- In office 2013–2019
- Preceded by: Probal Dasgupta
- Succeeded by: Duncan Charters

Mark Fettes is an Esperantist and university professor of education, and former President of the World Esperanto Association, known by its Esperanto initials as UEA.

== Career in Esperantujo ==
Fettes worked from October 1986 until January 1992 in the UEA central office as editor of the monthly magazine Esperanto. In this period he also re-established the UEA's public relations section; he has become known as a speaker and organizer. In 1990 he wrote an essay on the theme "One language for Europe," which won an award from the European Union Studies Association and later appeared as an official Esperanto document in several languages.

At the 77th World Congress in Vienna he was elected as a UEA board member, and in 1994 he accepted the position of secretary-general after the resignation of British Esperantist Ian Jackson. He was re-elected as secretary-general the following year, but in 1996 he resigned that post in favour of Italian Esperantist Michela Lipari, although he remained a board member until 1998. At the 81st World Congress in Prague, he launched the Prague Manifesto, a multilingual document which emphasizes democratic communication, language rights, preservation of language diversity and effective language education. Fettes also organized the first Nitobe symposium, organized as an homage to the Japanese author, educator and diplomat Nitobe Inazō; the symposium's proceedings later appeared in the book Al lingva demokratio ("Towards linguistic democracy").

In 1992 he became an editor of the Esperanto magazine Monato, with a column La monda vilaĝo ("The global village"), a position he held till 1995. Fettes began working with the Esperantic Studies Foundation (ESF) in 1995 and became its first director-general in 2000. In April 2001 he organized a seminar on Esperanto and education in Arlington, Virginia, part of the Washington, D.C. conurbation. The colloquium led to the creation of two educational website projects — edukado.net and lernu.net.

In 2010, after a 12-year absence from the UEA Komitato (its governing committee), Fettes went back as a category-B member (i.e., a member-at-large). He proposed that the Komitato create a board for strategic questions; the Komitato accepted his proposal and chose him to guide the board.

At a July 20, 2013 Komitato meeting held during the 98th World Congress of Esperanto in Reykjavík, Fettes was elected as the UEA's President. His role includes leading the board's "Managing development" team; he is responsible for the strategic workplan, finances, headquarters, congress policy, the World Esperanto Youth Organization (TEJO), the Center for Research and Documentation on World Language Problems and the UEA's website, uea.org.

== Personal life ==
Fettes learnt Esperanto as a 14-year-old boy in New Zealand, having been introduced to it by his uncle Christopher Fettes.

In 2000 he and his family moved to Vancouver; after a year as a postdoctoral researcher at Simon Fraser University, he became an assistant professor in the education faculty, where he still works. After joining the SFU faculty, Fettes joined the board of ESF, where he is currently its vice-president. In this role he was responsible for ESF's collaboration with the international youth non-profit organization E@I and the planning and development of various networking and other projects.

In 2003 he received a $1 million research grant to study the education of indigenous children. In 2010, along with a colleague, he shared a second $1 million research grant to develop an environmental public elementary school in the neighbouring city of Maple Ridge. The school aims to teach children about the environment and raise awareness of ecological issues. Fettes is also conducting a study to examine the differences between outdoor experiential learning and more traditional textbook learning.
