= Karsch =

Karsch may refer to:

- Anna Louisa Karsch (1722–1791), German autodidact and poet
- Anton Karsch (1822–1892), German botanist, microbiologist and naturalist
- Doug Karsch (born 1969), American talk radio show host and Michigan Wolverines sports reporter
- Ferdinand Karsch (1853–1936), German arachnologist, entomologist, and sexologist
- Joachim Karsch (1897–1945), German artist
- Johannes Waldemar Karsch (1881–1939), German Esperantist
- Tom Karsch, the former executive vice president and general manager for Turner Classic Movies and Turner South
