= Helmar Frank =

German mathematician (1933–2013)

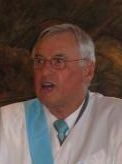
Helmar Frank

Helmar Gunter Frank (19 February 1933, Waiblingen – 15 December 2013, Paderborn) was a German mathematician and pedagogist. He was among the first scientists to apply mathematical methods in teaching and psychology. He established a method to measure intelligence on an absolute and homogeneous scale rather than by comparison between individuals, see information processing theory, and became in such a way the founder of the Erlangen School of Information Psychology.

Frank got his PhD from the University of Stuttgart in 1959, working on the principles of an informational esthetics. From 1961 to 1963 he was a member of the research group on "learning automata" at the University of Karlsruhe. In 1963 he was appointed professor for informational sciences (later cybernetics) at the Pädagogische Hochschule Berlin (being the youngest full professor in Germany, with an age of 30) and established the Institute of Cybernetics.

In 1972 he became one of the founders of the University of Paderborn where he continued his work on a cybernetic theory of psychology and pedagogy. In 1985 he founded, together with Reinhard Selten, Ivo Lapenna, Fabrizio Pennacchietti, Humphrey Tonkin, and others, the Akademio Internacia de la Sciencoj San Marino (AIS), an international academy of sciences. He was its president until December 2007.

In the late 1970s and early 1980s he was the initiator and scientific evaluator of an international teaching experiment on the propaedeutic value of Esperanto.

In 1998 he was awarded the 1st class Bundesverdienstkreuz. Frank taught as a guest or honorary professor at the Technische Universität Berlin and the universities of Guangzhou, Nitra, Prague, Rosario, and Sibiu. He was the founder and long-time editor-in-chief of the scientific journal Grundlagenstudien aus Kybernetik und Geisteswissenschaft.

Frank's wife, Věra Barandovská-Frank, is a well-known Czech Esperantist.
