= Harold Bolingbroke Mudie =

British Esperantist (1880–1916)

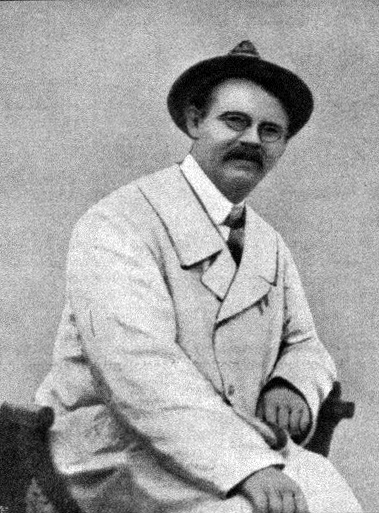
Harold Bolingbroke Mudie, British Esperantist

Harold Bolingbroke Mudie (London, 30 January 1880 – 6 January 1916) was a British Esperantist. He served as the first President of the World Esperanto Association.

He learnt Esperanto in 1902, having read about it on the Review of Reviews. In November 1903 he founded the gazette The Esperantist, thanks to a financial guarantee by William Thomas Stead; nevertheless, the magazine proved profitable. When the magazine was united with The British Esperantist, in January 1906, he joined its editorial committee. He was a strong supporter of the work to publish the New Testament in Esperanto.

He was an advocate for the promotion of Esperanto in other countries, several of which he visited during World Esperanto Congresses.

He first served as vice-president, then as president (from 1912 to 1916) of the British Esperanto Association. In 1908 he became president of the newly founded World Esperanto Association. Eduard Stettler nominated him "president since his birth", because of his great rhetorical ability. He was a member of the Lingva Komitato, the precursor to the current Akademio de Esperanto.

After the beginning of the first World War, he joined the army and rapidly became captain. In January 1916 he died in a car accident in Forges-les-Eaux France. He is buried in the cemetery of Forges-les-Eaux.

A new president of the World Esperanto Association was not appointed until 1919—the previous vice-president, Hector Hodler.

Universal Esperanto Association
Preceded by -	President; 1908 – 1916	Succeeded by Hector Hodler (since 1919)
