= Grégoire Maertens =

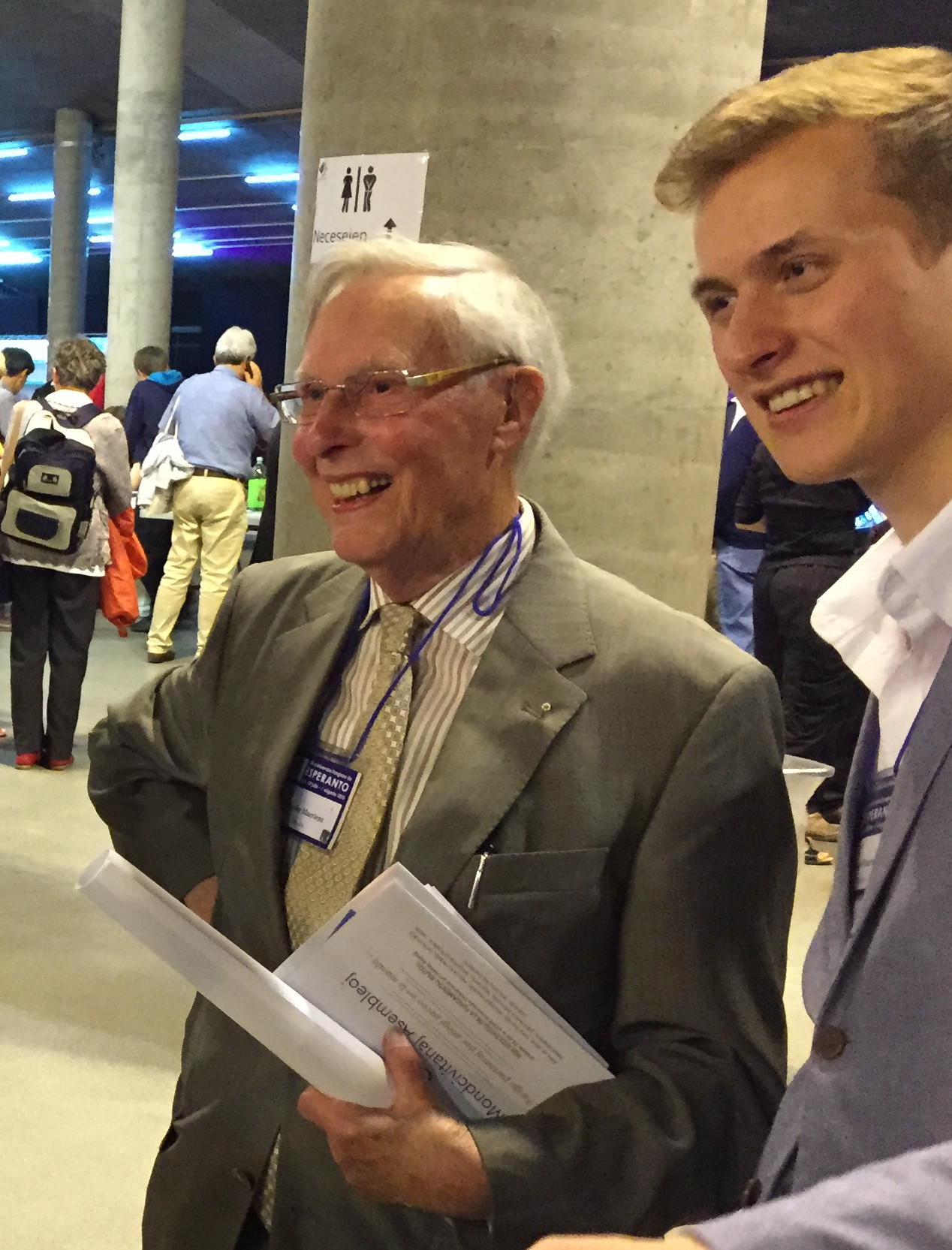
Maertens with his grandson Rakoen Maertens at the 100th World Congress of Esperanto in Lille, France, 2015

Grégoire Maertens (born 1 January 1924) is a Belgian Esperantist who was a member of the Estraro (steering committee) for the UEA (Universala Esperanto-Asocio or World Esperanto Association) from 1977 until 1992. From 1980 until 1986, he was president of the UEA, and an honorary member from 1993 onwards.

Maertens was born in Bruges, West Flanders, where he became active in the local Esperanto movement in Bruges as of 1946 and became a member of the BEF (Belga Esperanto-Federacio or Belgian Esperanto Federation). He was a lecturer at the AIS (Akademio Internacia de la Sciencoj or International Academy of Science) in San Marino, where he was also treasurer from 1992 until 1995.

He turned 100 on 1 January 2024. On this occasion, he received a personal letter of congratulations from George Soros, whom Maertens had helped move to England shortly after the two met at the 1947 International Esperanto Youth Congress in Bern.

Universal Esperanto Association
| Preceded by Humphrey Tonkin | President; 1980 – 1986 | Succeeded by Humphrey Tonkin |
