= Anna Löwenstein =

British Esperantist

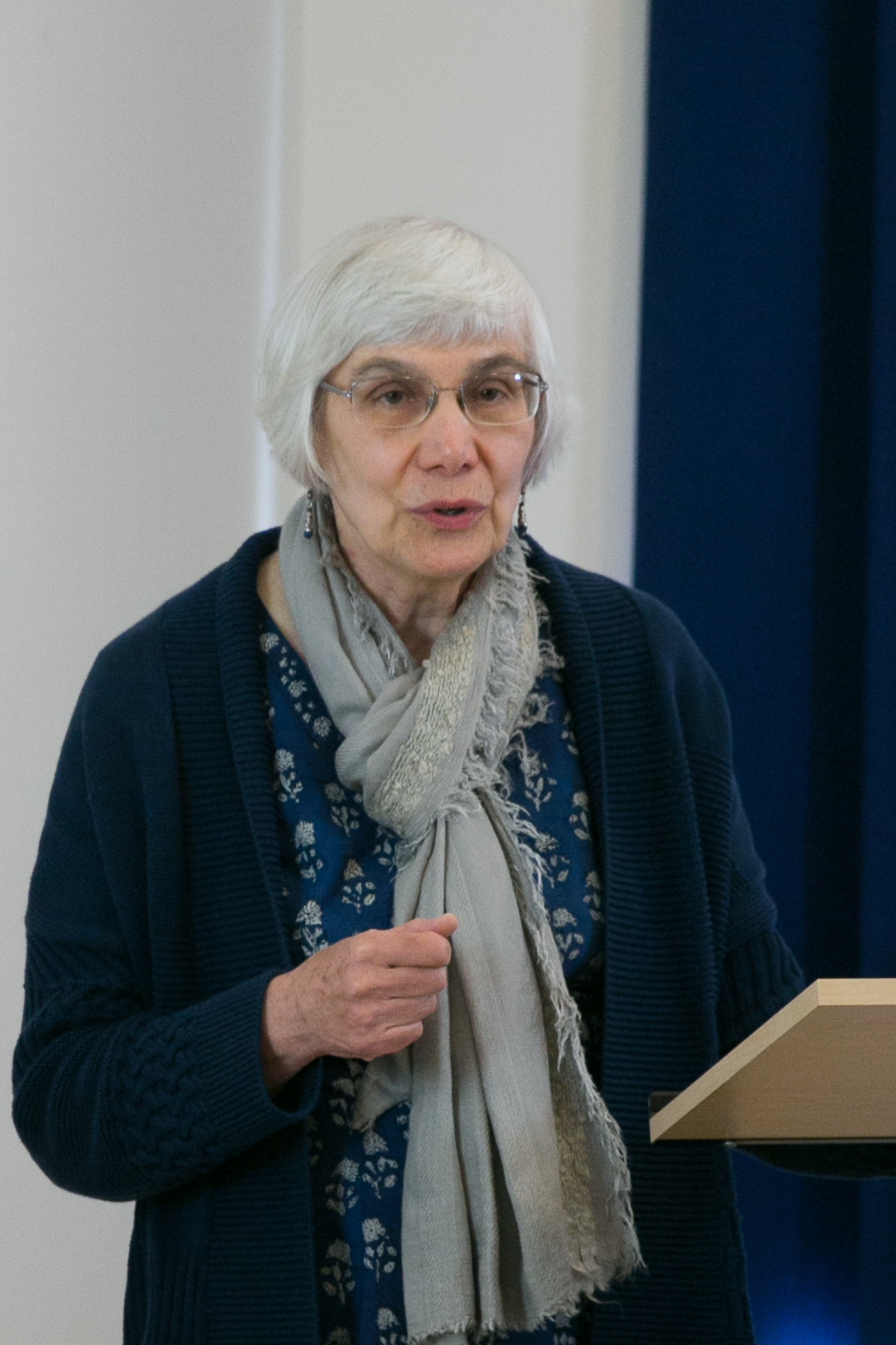
- Löwenstein in 2016
- Born: 1951 (age 74–75)
- Other name: Anna Brennan
- Occupations: Journalist, teacher
- Known for: Esperanto work and activism
- Spouse: Renato Corsetti (died 2025)
- Father: Heinz Bernard

Anna Löwenstein (born 1951) is a British journalist, teacher and activist in the Esperanto movement.

== Biography ==
Löwenstein worked for the Universal Esperanto Association from 1977 to 1981. She has more than 20 years of experience in teaching Esperanto. She has been a member of the Academy of Esperanto since 2001.

Under the name Anna Brennan, she founded and was editor of the feminist magazine Sekso kaj Egaleco 1979–1988, and she edited the "easy language" section of Kontakto during 1983–1986. She has written some non-fiction, and two novels. Her historical novel The Stone City (La Ŝtona Urbo), was first published in English and Esperanto in 1999, and has since been translated into French (2010) and Hungarian (2014). Her second novel Morto de artisto (2008) was published in Esperanto.

She is the widow of Renato Corsetti (1941–2025), who served as president of the Universal Esperanto Association. The couple lived together in Italy from 1981, then from 2015 lived in the United Kingdom. Her father was the actor and director Heinz Bernard.
