= Maertens =

Maertens is a surname. Notable people with the surname include:

- Bert Maertens (born 1981), Belgian politician
- Birger Maertens (born 1980), Belgian footballer
- Bob Maertens (1930–2003), Belgian footballer and manager
- Erhard Maertens (1891–1945), German Vizeadmiral of the Kriegsmarine
- Freddy Maertens (born 1952), Belgian cyclist
- Grégoire Maertens (born 1924), Belgian Esperantist
- Mathieu Maertens (born 1995), Belgian footballer
- Rémy Maertens, Belgian tug of war competitor
- Willy Maertens (1893–1967), German actor
