= Montevideo Resolution =

UNESCO resolution promoting Esperanto

The conference was held in the Legislative Palace of Uruguay.

Resolution IV.4.422-4224, commonly referred to as the Montevideo Resolution, is a resolution passed in Montevideo, Uruguay, on 10 December 1954 by the General Conference of UNESCO. The resolution officially supports the constructed language Esperanto as an international auxiliary language and recommends that the Director-General of UNESCO follow current developments in the use of the language. The Montevideo Resolution was the result of a long campaign by Ivo Lapenna.

In 1977, the Director-General visited the World Esperanto Congress in Reykjavík, Iceland, and in 1985 UNESCO passed a further resolution recommending that member countries encourage the teaching of Esperanto.

== Text ==
General Conference of Unesco. Eight session. Montevideo (Uruguay), 1954. Resolution adopted on December 10, 1954, in the 18th plenary meeting.

- IV.1.4.422

The General Conference,
Having discussed the report of the Director-General on the international petition in favour of Esperanto (8C/PRG/3),

- IV.1.4.4221

Takes note of the results attained by Esperanto in the field of international intellectual relations and the rapprochement of the peoples of the world;

- IV.1.4.4222

Recognizes that these results correspond with the aims and ideals of Unesco;

- IV.1.4.4223

Takes note that several Member States have announced their readiness to introduce or expand the teaching of Esperanto in their schools and higher educational establishments, and requests these Member States to keep the Director-General informed of the results attained in this field;

- IV.1.4.4224

Authorizes the Director-General to follow current developments in the use of Esperanto in education, science and culture, and, to this end, to co-operate with the Universal Esperanto Association in matters concerning both organizations.
