= Renato Corsetti =

Italian Esperantist (1941–2025)

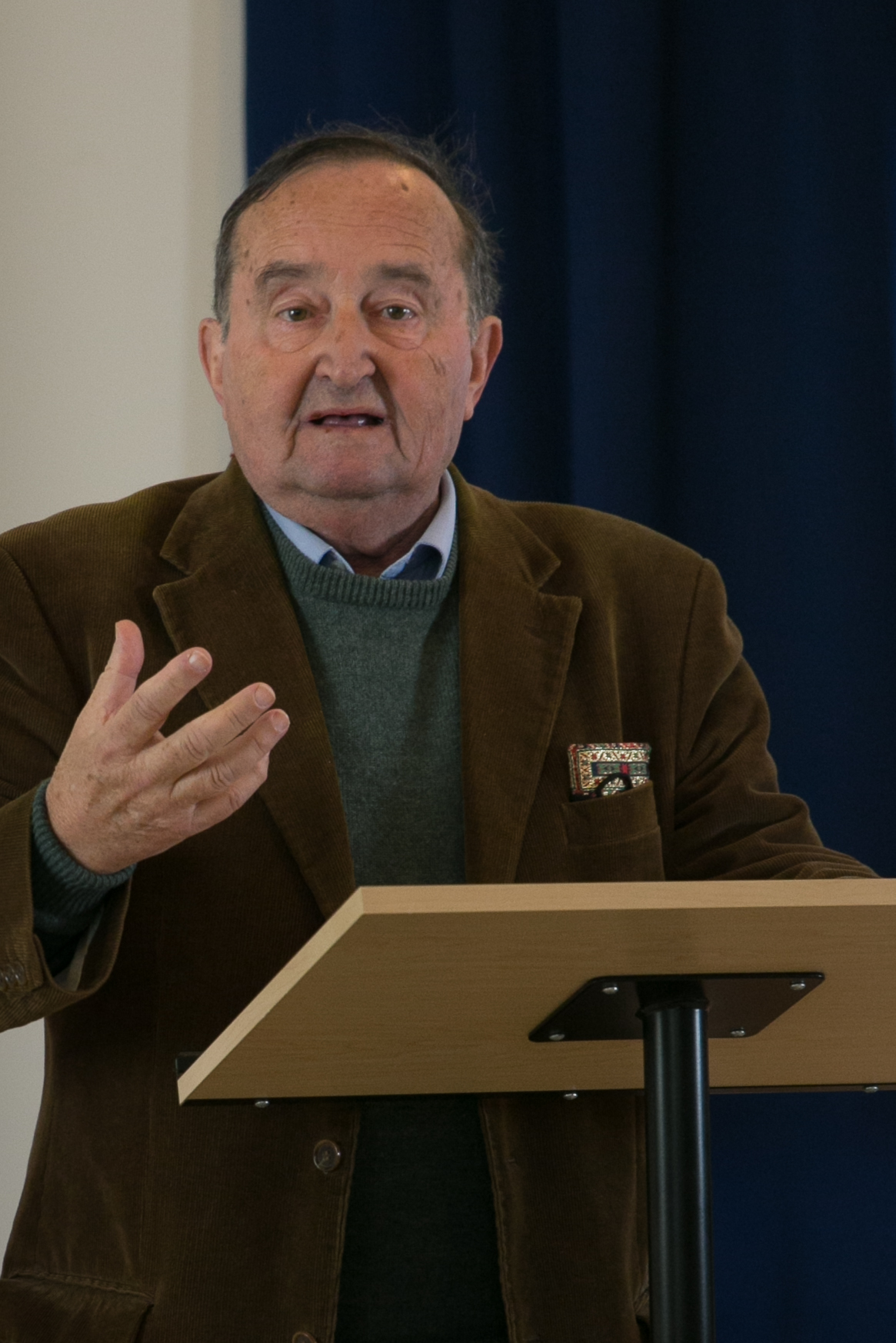
- Corsetti in 2016

President of the Universal Esperanto Association
- In office 2001–2007
- Preceded by: Keppel Enderby
- Succeeded by: Probal Dasgupta

Personal details
- Born: 29 March 1941 Rome, Italy
- Died: 1 February 2025 (aged 83)
- Spouse: Anna Lowenstein

Renato Corsetti (29 March 1941 – 1 February 2025) was an Italian Esperantist who served as President of the Universal Esperanto Association from 2001 to 2007. Born in Rome, Corsetti supported the idea that the people of the world should be able to communicate in a neutral and easy international language. He taught psycholinguistics at the Sapienza University of Rome. He was also an associate professor at the International Academy of Sciences San Marino.

Corsetti was married to Anna Löwenstein, also an Esperantist. The couple lived together in Italy from 1981, but as of 2015, they were living in the United Kingdom. Corsetti died on 1 February 2025, at the age of 83.

Universal Esperanto Association
Preceded by Kep Enderby	President; 2001–2007	Succeeded by Probal Dasgupta
