= Harry W. Holmes =

Henry William Holmes (also known as Harry) OBE, (1896 in London–8 November 1986 in London) was a board member and honorary president of the World Esperanto Association (Universala Esperanto-Asocio, UEA). He served as a staff officer of the British Ministry of Defence with the military rank of Brigadier and was appointed an Officer of the British Empire in the 1955 Birthday Honours list in acknowledgment of services to Great Britain. Holmes was also a Freemason.

He and his wife Nora Holmes (1902–14 May 1993) were for two decades among the most active members of the London Esperanto Club; he served as its president from 1933 until 1952. In this post, as in his editorship of Komuna kantlibro, a book of popular songs, his wife Nora assisted and collaborated with him to such a degree that he often spoke in terms of "our presidency."

In 1956 he was elected vice-president of the World Esperanto Association, a post he retained until 1964. After the death of President Giorgio Canuto in 1960, Holmes was acting president until 1962, when Prof. Hideo Yagi was elected to succeed Professor Canuto. After Professor Yagi's death in 1964, Holmes again was briefly acting president. At the 49th World Esperanto Congress, in recognition of his tireless labour and meritorious service to the Association, he was unanimously elected as honorary president of the UEA, a position he occupied for a decade. In 1974, because of changes to the UEA Steering Committee (Estraro), he resigned the honorary presidency.

Harry Holmes's last work, Londono Vokas ("London Calling"), published in 1981, related the 75-year history of the London Esperanto Club.
