= Louis Bastien =

Louis Bastien may refer to:

- Louis Bastien (cyclist) (1881–1963), French cyclist won a gold medal at the 1900 Summer Olympics
- Louis Bastien (Esperantist) (1869–1961), French leader of the Esperanto movement

== See also ==
- Lou Bastien, American professional wrestler
