= Ernfrid Malmgren =

Swedish Esperantist (1899–1970)

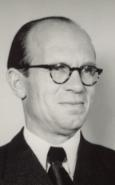
- Born: Ernfrid Cart Malmgren; 3 November 1899; Köping, Sweden
- Died: 28 March 1970 (aged 70); Sweden

Ernfrid Cart Malmgren (Köping, 3 November 1899 – 28 March 1970) was a Swedish Esperantist, teacher, and president of the Universal Esperanto Association (UEA).

== Publications ==
- Esperanto kaj ĝia instruado en lernejoj (laŭ materialo de Somera Pedagogia Semajno en Kranjska Gora de 26a julio ĝis 1a aŭgusto 1957, red. Peter Zlatnar, antauparolo de E. Malmgren. - Jugoslavia Esperanto-Federacio, 1959. - 200 p.)
- La nuna stato de la instruado de la internacia lingvo en la lernejoj (Ivo Lapenna kunlabore kun E. Malmgren, D. Kennedy, 1963)
- Allas andra spraak Esperanto (1957)
- Amikaro adiaŭas amatan Stellan Engholm
- La Esperanto-Klubo: kial fondi ĝin, kiel fondi ĝin, kiaj estu la programoj (1933)
- Per kio ni amuzu nin? Societ- kaj dancludoj (de Jakob Rosenberg; Ernfrid Malmgren. - 1934
- Systematický kurs mezinárodního jazyka Esperanto (Henrik Seppik; Ernfrid Malmgren - en la ĉeĥan trad. Ladislav Krajc. 1938)
- Systematisk kurs i Esperanto (Henrik Seppik; Ernfrid Malmgren. - 1932)
- Esperanto keele süstemaatiline kursus (Henrik Seppik; Ernfrid Malmgren. - 1936)
- Sveda kantareto (1931)

Universal Esperanto Association
Preceded by Hans Hermann Kürsteiner	President; 1947–1956	Succeeded by Giorgio Canuto

== See also ==
- President of the World Esperanto Association
