= Probal Dasgupta =

Indian linguist (1953–2026)

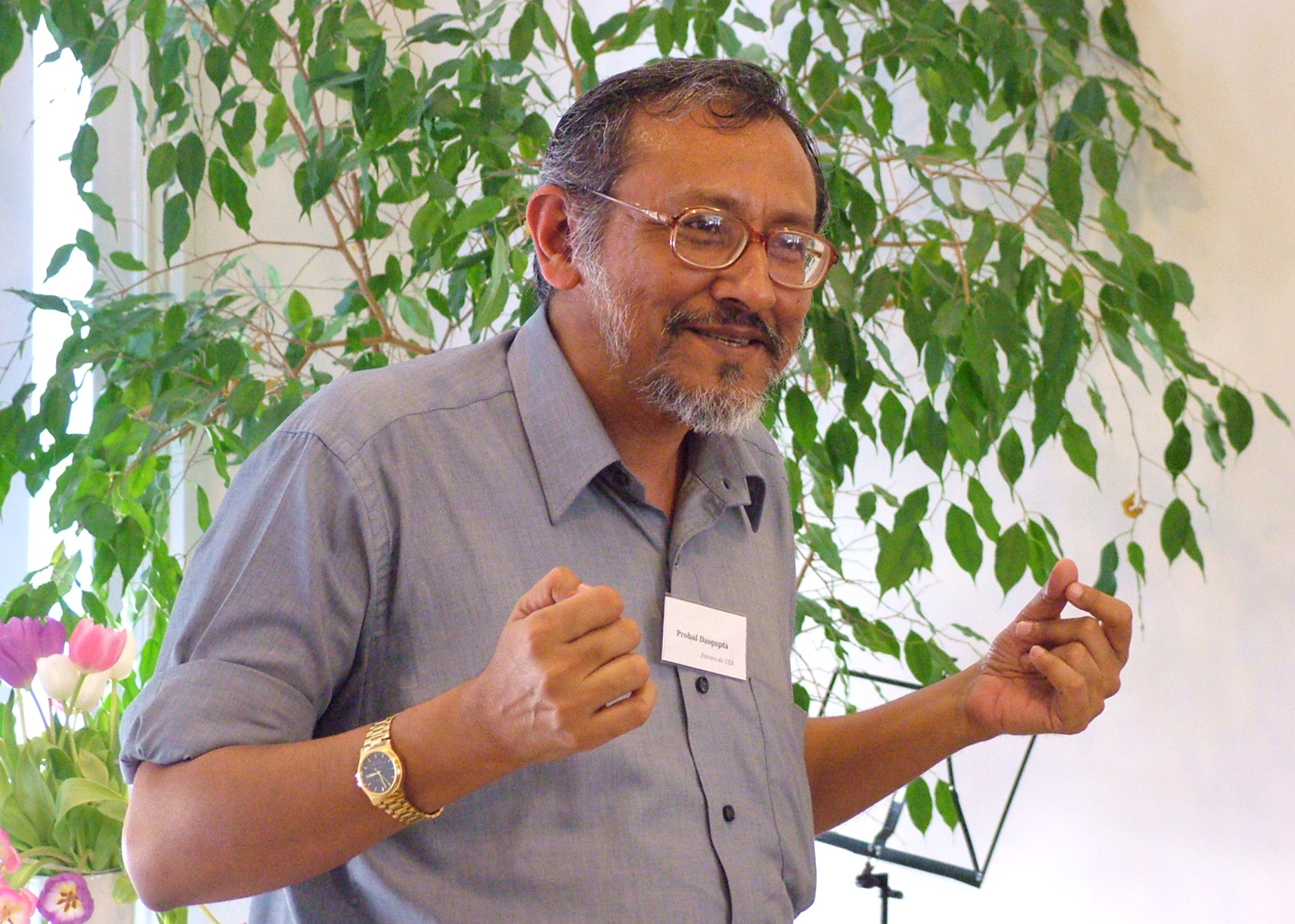
- Dasgupta in 2008
- Born: 19 September 1953; Calcutta, West Bengal, India
- Died: 1 June 2026 (aged 72); Kolkata, West Bengal, India
- Citizenship: Indian
- Education: New York University (PhD)
- Known for: Substantivism; Bangla syntax; Esperanto studies
- Scientific career
- Fields: Linguistics, sociolinguistics
- Workplaces: University of Calcutta; University of Hyderabad; Indian Statistical Institute
- Thesis: Questions and Relative and Complement Clauses in a Bangla Grammar (1980)

Probal Dasgupta (19 September 1953 – 1 June 2026) was an Indian linguist, Esperantist and academic administrator. He published his first article in phonology in Indian Linguistics, the journal of the Linguistic Society of India, at the age of eighteen. His doctoral dissertation at New York University, Questions and Relative and Complement Clauses in a Bangla Grammar (1980), contributed to the study of Bangla syntax.

Dasgupta's research focused on Bangla syntax, morphology and sociolinguistics. He is associated with the development of the substantivist approach to linguistics in collaboration with Rajendra Singh. Beyond formal linguistics, he wrote on Esperanto studies and language politics, including The Otherness of English: India's Auntie Tongue Syndrome (1993), which examined the sociolinguistic position of English in India.

He was a member of the Akademio de Esperanto beginning in 1983 and served as its vice-president from 2001 to 2015. In 2016 he was elected president of the Akademio for a three-year term ending in 2019 and was subsequently re-elected to serve until 2022. He also served as president of the Universal Esperanto Association from 2007 to 2013.

Dasgupta taught at the University of Calcutta, Deccan College Postgraduate and Research Institute, the University of Hyderabad, and the Indian Statistical Institute, where he headed the Linguistic Research Unit from 2008 until his retirement in 2018.

== Early life ==
Dasgupta was born in 1953 in Kolkata, West Bengal, to Arun Kumar Dasgupta (1925–2007), a historian, and Manashi Dasgupta (née Roy, 1928–2010), a social psychologist. His father taught at institutions including Presidency College (Kolkata), Burdwan University and the University of Calcutta, retiring as Professor of History in 1985. His work on trade and politics contributed to scholarship in maritime historiography.

His mother served as Principal of Sri Shikshayatan College, Kolkata, and later directed Rabindra Bhavan at Visva-Bharati, Santiniketan. She was associated with Rabindrasangeet and published works in social psychology and creative writing.

In 1957 he travelled to Ithaca, New York, where his father was pursuing doctoral studies at Cornell University. He attended East Hill High School during this period. The family returned to India in 1961.

== Education ==
After returning to India, Dasgupta attended St. Lawrence High School in Kolkata, where he was placed in the Bangla-medium stream. He later studied at St. Xavier's Collegiate School, completing his schooling in 1970.

Dasgupta studied linguistics with Pali as a subsidiary at Sanskrit College, Kolkata. He subsequently pursued higher studies in linguistics at Deccan College Postgraduate and Research Institute, Pune. In 1975 he joined New York University's Graduate School of Arts and Science, where he completed his PhD in 1980. His doctoral dissertation, Questions and Relative and Complement Clauses in a Bangla Grammar, was supervised by Lewis Levine and Ray C. Dougherty.

== Professional life ==
Dasgupta began his academic career in linguistics with research in syntax, although his first published paper (1972) was in phonology. During the 1970s and 1980s he published studies on Bangla syntax and phonology. His 1989 book Projective Syntax: Theory and Applications was centred on syntactic theory while also engaging broader theoretical questions within linguistics.

In collaboration with Rajendra Singh, Dasgupta contributed to the development of the substantivist approach to linguistics, an orientation that incorporates elements of Whole Word Morphology into a broader theoretical framework. His later works, including Loĝi en homaj lingvoj: la substancisma perspektivo (2011) and Inhabiting Human Languages: the Substantivist Visualization (2012), further articulated this perspective.

In 1993 he published The Otherness of English: India's Auntie Tongue Syndrome, a sociolinguistic study examining the status of English in India. The book was reviewed in Applied Linguistics, where it was described as a "brilliant intellectual tour de force".

Beyond linguistics, Dasgupta wrote on Esperanto studies and language policy. He served in leadership roles within the Esperanto movement, including as president of the Universal Esperanto Association (2007–2013) and president of the Akademio de Esperanto (2016–2022).

== Personal life and death ==
Dasgupta was married to Malasree Dasgupta and had a son. He died from a stroke in Kolkata, on 1 June 2026, at the age of 72.

== Works (selection) ==
- Degree words in Esperanto and categories in universal grammar. In: Klaus Schubert: Interlinguistics: aspects of the science of planned languages, 1989 pp. 231–247
- Towards a dialogue between the sociolinguistic sciences and Esperanto culture. Language Problems and Language Planning.11.3.304-34. 1987.
- Explorations in Indian Sociolinguistics, Rajendra Singh, Probal Dasgupta, Jayant K. Lele. New Delhi: Sage 1995.
- After Etymology:Towards a Substantivist Linguistics. (With Alan Ford and Rajendra Singh). München: Lincom Europa. 2000
- Dasgupta, Probal (2011). Loĝi en homaj lingvoj: la substancisma perspektivo. New York: Mondial. ISBN 978-1-59569-214-6.
- Dasgupta, Probal (2012). Inhabiting Human Languages: the Substantivist Visualization. New Delhi: Samskriti and Indian Council of Philosophical Research. pp. xviii + 148. ISBN 978-81-87374-70-1.
- Bayer, Josef and Dasgupta Probal (2016). Emphatic Topicalization and the Structure of the Left Periphery: Evidence from German and Bangla in. Syntax:19. pp 309–353
- Dasgupta Probal (2016).Luki Pre-demonstracyjne w Jezyku Bengalskim: Syntaktyczna i Semiotyczna Zdolnosz Odzyskiwania. Language Communication Information:11 pp 195–212

== Translations from Bengali ==
- Manashi DasGupta: Dormanta hejmaro, Antwerp: Flandra Esperanto-Ligo 2006
- Manashi DasGupta: Mi juna, Rotterdam: Esperantaj Kajeroj 1989
- Rabindranath Tagore: Primico, København: TK 1977
- Upendronath Gangopaddhae: Klera edzino, Pisa: Edistudio 1994

== Honours and awards ==
- (a) LSA 2004–2026: Dasgupta was made an honorary member of the Linguistic Society of America in 2004.
- (b) Bangiya Sahitya Parishat's Archana Choudhuri Prize 2012: He was awarded the prestigious Archana Choudhari Prize in the year 2012 by the Bangiya Sahitya Parishat for his contributions.
- (c) West Bengal government's Vidyasagar-Dinamoyee Prize 2021: In 2021, he was one of the four recipients of the Vidyasagar-Dinamoyee Prize awarded by the Government of West Bengal's Department of Higher Education. This prize (earlier called the Vidyasagar Prize) is given for the recipient's lifetime achievements. It commemorates Ishwarchandra Vidyasagar.

Universal Esperanto Association
Preceded by Renato Corsetti	President; 2001–2007	Succeeded by Mark Fettes
