= Louis Bastien (Esperantist) =

French Esperantist and quartermaster

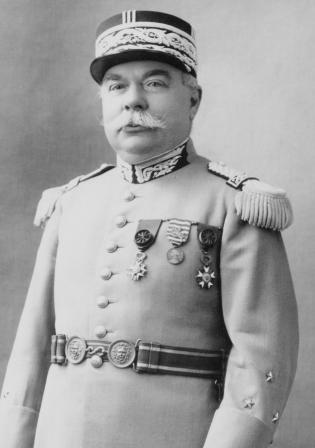
Prominent member of the development of Esperanto in France

Louis Marie Jules Charles Bastien (December 21, 1869 in Obernai, near Strasbourg – April 10, 1961) was a French Esperantist and a quartermaster in the French army. In 1899 he married Marguerite Pfulb (1879–1941); the couple had three daughters and two sons. In school he learned mathematics, classical French literature, Latin and Greek and learned to compose Latin verse. After a year of preparatory studies at l'Ecole Sainte-Geneviève in Versailles he entered l'Ecole Polytechnique in 1887 at the age of 17. Not having the maturity of his older classmates, he did not excel in his studies and, on graduation in 1889, had to content himself with a military career.

== French Army career ==
Commissioned as a sub-lieutenant in the French Army, Bastien studied military engineering at Fontainebleau and was posted with the Second Company of Engineers at Arras (Pas-de-Calais).

=== Madagascar campaign ===
In 1895 the government of France sent him on a punitive campaign to Madagascar. Queen Ranavalona III had repudiated the Lambert Charter, an 1855 document which gave a French family the right to exploit Malagasy resources and which, after Britain renounced colonial claims to the island, effectively made the island a French protectorate. Bastien was responsible for telegraphic liaison, using Claude Chappe's optical telegraphic system, in which pairs of trained semaphore operators would relay messages from one tower to the next. The Chappe towers were spaced about 14 km apart between Mahajanga, where the troops had disembarked, and the position of the troops advancing on Antananarivo, the capital. Alone in a horse-drawn two-wheeled light cart, Bastien would survey the line of signal towers in the low and marshy areas between Mahajanga and Maevatanana, then follow the high plateaus along the Betsiboka River to Antananarivo.

Most of the soldiers from France who died in the Madagascar campaign lost their lives not in war with the poorly armed and unorganized local population but from "paludal fever." In the belief that this fever (now known as malaria) was waterborne, soldiers were ordered to drink only boiled water. It was not till three years later that Sir Ronald Ross conclusively determined that the cause of malaria is a parasite transmitted by the Anopheles mosquito.

One day Bastien stopped his horse and cart at one of the Chappe towers on his route and discovered one of the telegraph operators dying of malaria; the other operator had already died. Bastien gave what comfort he could to the dying soldier, then searched for the packet of messages they had received for transmission. He personally relayed the messages as required in both directions along the tower chain, then followed with his own message to headquarters: "Send two men to relieve the officer in Tower No. --." Relief operators did not arrive at once, of course, and Bastien spent many hours alone at the tower without food or drink.

=== French Army Quartermaster ===
After Madagascar was proclaimed a French colony in 1896, Bastien returned to France, to be stationed at Amiens, where he completed his fr:Licence en droit (Bachelor of Laws) to qualify for l'Intendance (the Army's Supply Corps). He used to say: "Being a soldier in the army without a trade, I could only choose the least militaristic specialty." Bastien was accomplished in several fields — a man of letters, a mathematician, a thinker and administrator — everything but a warrior, though a dutiful patriot and a man of conscience. Admitted to l'École Supérieure de l'Intendance (now fr:École militaire supérieure d'administration et de management) and having received his fourth stripe as a Commandant (a rank equivalent to Major — every quartermaster is a senior officer), he followed a trajectory that led him through the ranks successively to Besançon, Lons-le-Saulnier, Épinal, Valenciennes, Commercy and Châlons-sur-Marne.

When World War I broke out, Bastien was at Saint-Brieuc, and his five stripes indicated his rank of lieutenant-colonel. He followed the events of the war with a mixture of hope and anguish. By the end of the war, he was a Quartermaster-General, Second Class in Paris, and in 1919 he went to Strasbourg to serve as director of the Supply Corps for the Alsace district.

== Esperanto ==
Bastien became an Esperantist in 1902 and busied himself with promoting Esperanto, first in the north of France, then in the east of the country. Having attended the first World Congress of Esperanto (Boulogne-sur-Mer, France, in 1905), he became vice-president of the Société pour la propagation de l'Espéranto (now known as Espéranto-France) and was interested in the international organization of the Esperanto movement. In 1909 he became a member of the Lingva Komitato (now known as the Esperanto Academy). In 1924 at the Strasbourg Congress he was chosen as a director of the Société Française Espérantiste, becoming its vice-president in 1928.

At the 1934 World Congress of Esperanto in Stockholm he was elected president of the World Esperanto Association (UEA). Under his leadership, the Estraro (the UEA Steering Committee) declared, on September 18, 1936, the foundation of a new association, the International Esperanto League (IEL). Thus arose a schism in the Esperanto movement because the Swiss members, in particular, continued the old "Genevan" UEA. Bastien was IEL president until 1947 and, after the IEL reunited with the UEA, he was made honorary president of the UEA. He died in 1961.

== Works ==
- Naŭlingva Etimologia Leksikono, Presa Esperantista Societo, Paris, 1907
- Funebra Parolado pri Louis de Bourbon, Princo de Condé de Bossuet, (translated to Esperanto from French), Presa Esperantista Societo, Paris, 1911
- Poŝvortareto por francoj, 1932
- Vocabulaire de poche Français-Espéranto, suivi d'un aide-mémoire Espéranto-Français (Pocket French-Esperanto Vocabulary), Librairie Centrale Espérantiste, Paris, 1937
- Militista Vortareto (Esperanta, Franca, Angla, Germana, Itala), (Military Vocabulary in five languages), Comité Français d'Information Espérantiste, Paris, 1955
- Preface to Pierre Delaire, l'Esperanto en douze leçons (Esperanto in 12 lessons), Centre National Esperanto Office, Orléans, 1955
- Contributions to Enciklopedio de Esperanto
