= Humphrey Tonkin =

4th President of the University of Hartford

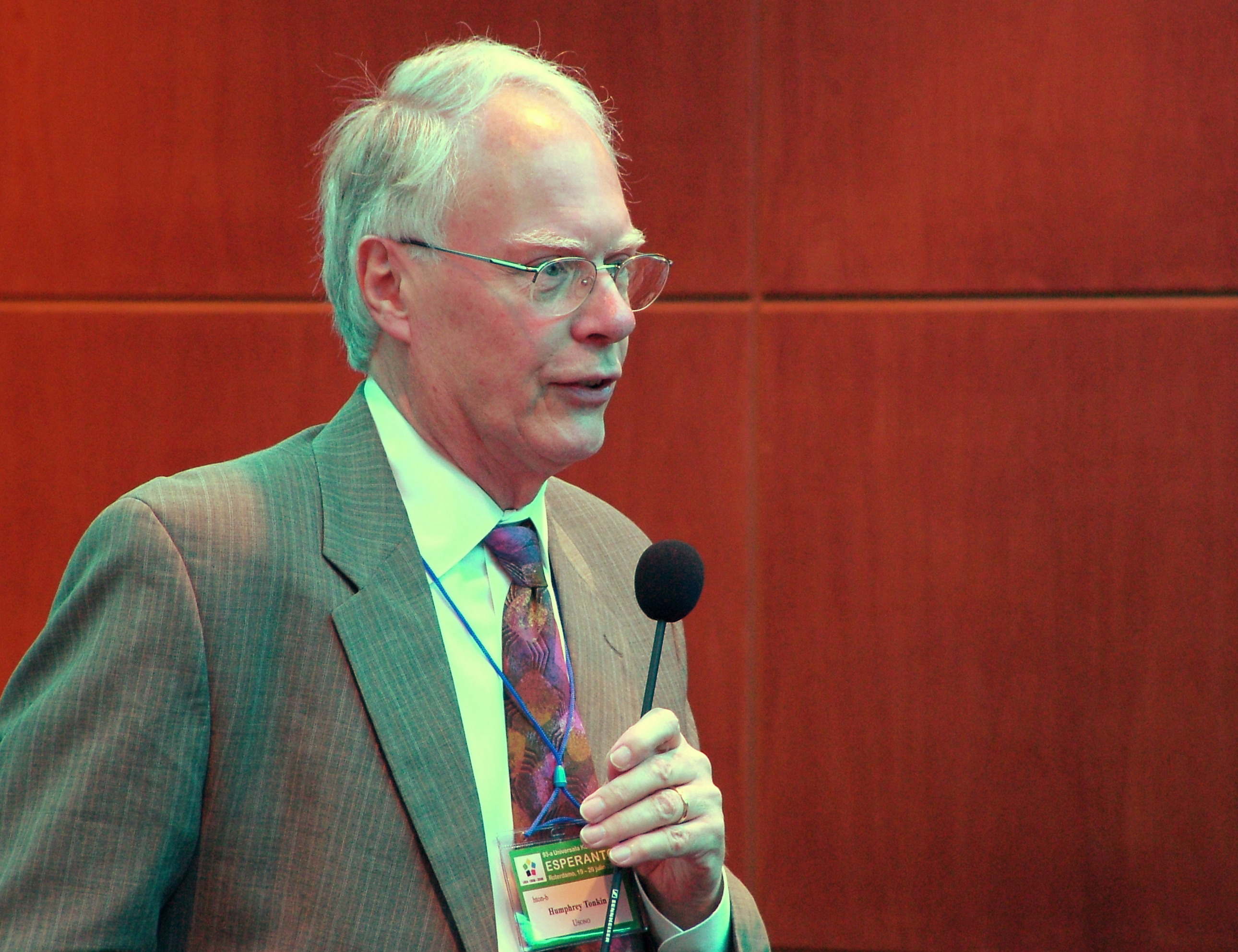
- Tonkin in 2008

4th President of the University of Hartford
- In office 1989–1998
- Preceded by: Stephen J. Trachtenberg
- Succeeded by: Walter Harrison

Personal details
- Born: Humphrey R. Tonkin; 2 December 1939 (age 86) Truro, Cornwall
- Education: St John's College, Cambridge, Harvard University
- Website: Office of the President

Humphrey R. Tonkin (born 2 December 1939) is professor of English, and served as the 4th president of the University of Hartford. As a dedicated Esperantist he wrote, edited and translated outstanding esperantological works.

== Biography ==
Born in Truro, England, Tonkin is a dual citizen of the U.K. and the U.S. He earned his undergraduate degree from St John's College, Cambridge and his PhD from Harvard University. His academic specialities include the English Renaissance and Edmund Spenser, as well as language use and international languages.

As a professor of the University of Pennsylvania, Tonkin in 1970 received the Lindback Award for Distinguished Teaching. From 1971 to 1975 he served as Vice-Provost for Undergraduate Studies. In 1974 he was awarded a Guggenheim Fellowship and spent a research year (1975–76) at Oxford University. The years 1980–81 he spent as a visiting professor at Columbia University; in 1983 he became president of the Potsdam College of the State University of New York. From 1989 to 1998 he was president of the University of Hartford and University Professor of the Humanities. In 2006 he received the Cassandra Pyle Award for Leadership and Collaboration in International Education and Exchange. In semi-retirement, he taught Shakespeare and Development of Theatre at the University of Hartford's Hartt School until 2015.

As an Esperantist, Tonkin has written and translated numerous works in and about the language. Between 1974 and 1980 as well as between 1986 and 1989 he was president of the Universal Esperanto Association. In 1983 he was among the founders of the Esperantophone Akademio Internacia de la Sciencoj San Marino (AIS). Tonkin is also a member of the Akademio de Esperanto.

Tonkin is one of the editors of the journal Language Problems and Language Planning.

== Fund for Innovation ==
In 2022 Esperantic Studies Foundation created a fund that bears his name: "Humphrey Tonkin Fund for Innovation" to accelerate new projects for research in education and linguistic justice.

Academic offices
Preceded by Stephen Joel Trachtenberg	4th President of the University of Hartford; 1989–1998	Succeeded by Walter Harrison
Universal Esperanto Association
Preceded by Ivo Lapenna	President; 1974–1980	Succeeded by Grégoire Maertens
