= International League of Esperantist Radio Amateurs =

- Abbreviation: ILERA
- Formation: 1970
- Type: Nonprofit organization
- Members: 500
- Official language: Esperanto
- Affiliations: Universal Esperanto Association
- Website: ILERA

The International League of Esperantist Radio Amateurs (Esperanto: Internacia Ligo de Esperantistaj Radioamatoroj, ILERA) was founded in 1970. It occasionally organizes radio programs in Esperanto and has in the past published the ILERA bulletin.

== Activities and practices ==
Likely frequencies for Esperanto conversations on the air are 1866, 3766, 7066 (Europe), 14266, 28766 kHz for Voice (SSB), and 3640, 14166, 28266 kHz for CW, generally on weekends, according to Net Schedules when published on the ILERA web site.

In 2024 there is a group that meets using the Echolink server, *ILERA_EO" on Saturdays at 2pm eastern USA time.

Every year ILERA organizes the Esperanto-contest. Date is the third Saturday and following Sunday in November. So this year: 2026. Nov. 21-22.
