= Terminologia Esperanto-Centro =

The Terminologia Esperanto-Centro (TEC; English: Terminological Esperanto Center) is the terminology centre of the Universal Esperanto Association (UEA). UEA decided in 1985 that a terminology centre was needed for Esperanto. The centre was officially funded in 1987. Although TEC was not always as active as its creators had hoped it would be, the centre is still active and UEA is now cooperating both as an Associate Member of the International Information Centre for Terminology (Infoterm) in Vienna and as an A-liaison to the technical committee 37 on terminology and other language and content resources of the International Organization for Standardization (ISO).
