= Johannes Waldemar Karsch =

German Esperantist and state auditor

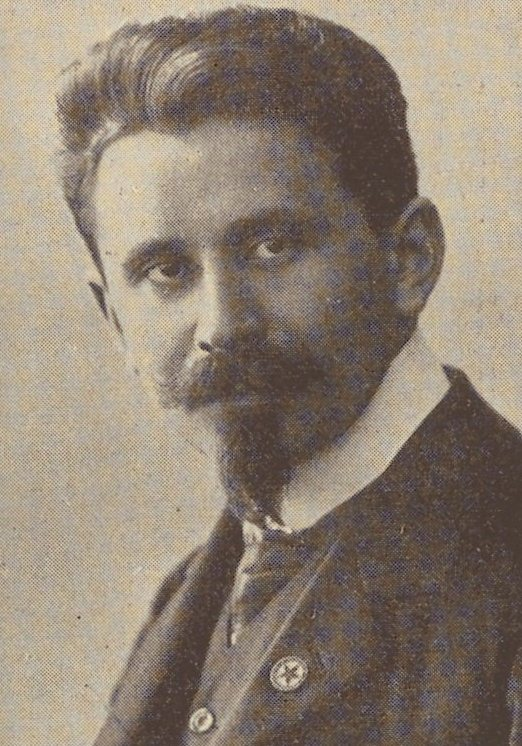
Photo from the album for the 8th World Esperanto Congress in 1912.

Johannes Waldemar Karsch (May 7, 1881 in Dresden – April 14, 1939 in Weixdorf near Dresden) was a German Esperantist and a state auditor.

Karsch became an Esperantist in 1908 and was soon secretary of a local group of the German Esperanto Association 1910–1914, serving as its president from 1924 on. He was wounded during World War I.

After 1913 he was a member of the Komitato of the World Esperanto Association (UEA), the Esperanto leadership group later known as the Estraro. In 1928 he became komisionano and vice-president of the UEA. Then, when Eduard Stettler was president, Karsch often stood in for Stettler, who was in ill health.

At the 1934 Stockholm World Esperanto Congress Karsch was not reelected to the Komitato. In protest, President Stettler resigned. Karsch stayed in contact with the Swiss leadership of the UEA but became inactive (largely because of the Hitler regime) and did not participate in the Geneva UEA of 1936.

== Works ==
- Neue Wege für die Verkehrswerbung (UEA brochure), 1929.
