= Esperanto (magazine) =

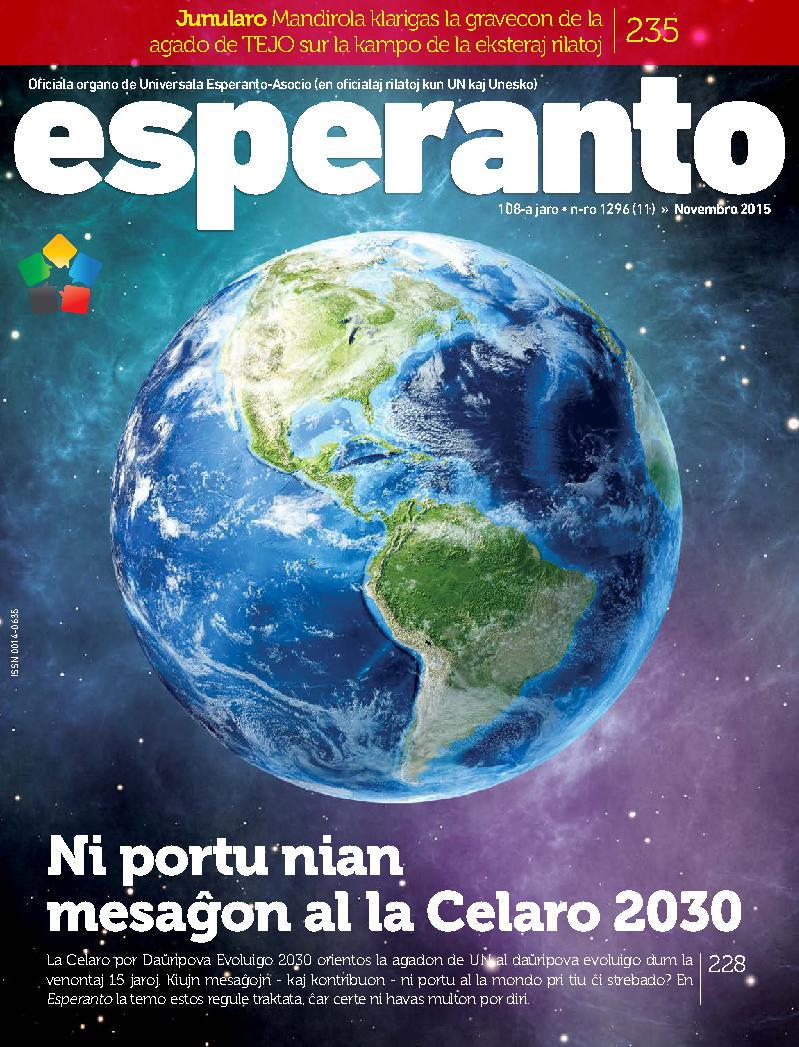
- Cover of the November 2015 issue
- Editor: Fabrício Valle
- Categories: Magazine
- Frequency: Monthly
- Publisher: Universal Esperanto Association
- Founder: Paul Berthelot
- First issue: 1905
- Country: Netherlands
- Based in: Rotterdam
- Language: Esperanto
- Website: Revuo Esperanto
- ISSN: 0014-0635

Esperanto is the main magazine used by the Universal Esperanto Association to inform their members of virtually everything happening in the world related to the international language Esperanto.

== History ==
The magazine was founded in 1905 by the Frenchman Paul Berthelot. In 1907, the Swiss Hector Hodler became editor-in-chief. The post has been held since January 2014 by the Brazilian Fabrício Valle, successor to Stano Marček. Attila Kaszás will succeed to Valle in May 2016.

The magazine was not published during the two World Wars. In-between, Edmond Privat was the director.

== Contents ==
The magazine shows events related to Esperanto, gives interviews of key actors in the Esperanto community, informs about the last published works. There also are opinions, analyses and decisions.
