= Tom Karsch =

Tom Karsch is the former executive vice president and general manager for Turner Classic Movies and Turner South. He resigned in March 2007. He has worked for other cable television stations Showtime, TNT, and AMC.

In 1980, he received a Bachelor of Arts from the School of Public Administration (SPA) at American University in Washington, DC. He resides with his wife and two sons in Atlanta.
