= International Academy of Sciences San Marino =

International scientific association

Academy logo

The International Academy of Sciences San Marino (Esperanto: Akademio Internacia de la Sciencoj San Marino, AIS) was a scientific association. It was established in 1983 and had its first convention, SUS 1, around New Year 1984 in the City of San Marino. After the Sammarinese skeleton law on higher education had been passed the academy was officially founded on 13 September 1985 (40 years ago), in the presence of the Captains-Regent. Its name uses the constructed international auxiliary language Esperanto.

Although the juristical association was officially dissolved at the end of 2020, the AIS is still active.

== History ==
The AIS was founded on an initiative of scientists from various countries, such as Helmar Frank, Humphrey Tonkin, and Reinhard Selten.

The Sammarinese government at first gave the academy broad moral support. When, however, the università degli studi was founded at San Marino in 1988, it gained priority over the AIS, which then concentrated on working abroad from San Marino. Conventions and summer schools were held in Bulgaria, Korea, the Czech Republic, Germany, France, Italy, Poland, Romania, Russia, Slovakia and Sweden.

== Structure ==
The AIS was divided into the following four sectors:

- Scientific Sector (SciS)
- Technological Sector (TeS)
- Artistic Sector (ArS)
- Supporting Sector (SubS)

The Scientific Sector consisted of six faculties. Its structure followed a strictly philosophical system, based on two criteria:

- The basic approach used by a scientific discipline, either idiographic (descriptive) or nomothetic (predictive), as proposed by Wilhelm Windelband;
- The position of the object of scientific research in Karl Popper's "three worlds": the outer world as perceived sensually, the mental world and the world of abstractions.

This led to a division into six sections:

	nomothetic	idiographic
World 1	(natural) sciences	morphologic sciences
World 2	cybernetics	humanities
World 3	structural sciences	philosophy

Each faculty was headed by a dean and is also further divided into three or four departments, each with their own head. Within the Scientific Sector there was a hierarchy of contributors.

Level of Membership	Title
Full Members (MdAIS)	Professors in ordinary (OProf)
Associated Members (AMdAIS)	Associated professors (AProf) and the independent lecturers (PDoc)
Adjuncts (AdAIS)	Associated lecturers (ADoc) or scientific assistants (ASci)

== Principles ==
The AIS was based on three principles that its members see insufficiently supported in other universities:

1. The absence of any cultural and linguistic bias not only in scientific content but also in the teaching of this content. In order to achieve this goal as far as possible the AIS held its conventions and summer schools in a neutral language; in its case, Esperanto. Students would write their thesis in two parallel languages: Esperanto and a second language of their choice (usually their native language). Research papers, too, were often written in two languages to reduce influence of language on the paper's logic.
2. Studying in several places. Students were encouraged to spend part of their studies abroad, or at least at an AIS summer school, so as to get in contact with other cultures.
3. Interdisciplinarity, intense contact and scientific exchange between the faculties and scientific branches. To achieve this, other faculties were required to be represented in examination committees, and students got maximum freedom in choosing their minor.

== Members ==
In 2006 the AIS consisted of about 250 scientists, among them a little fewer than 50 full members, including co-founder Reinhard Selten.

Some 300 scientists contributed to the AIS as members of the "International Scientific College" (Internacia Scienca Kolegio, ISK). They were not active in teaching for the AIS but were available for opinions on theses and similar tasks. Knowledge of Esperanto was a precondition for membership in the ISK (as well as the AIS).

A notable rector was Fabrizio Angelo Pennacchietti, an Italian orientalist who graduated from La Sapienza.
