= Ivo Lapenna =

Dalmatian Italian professor and Esperantist

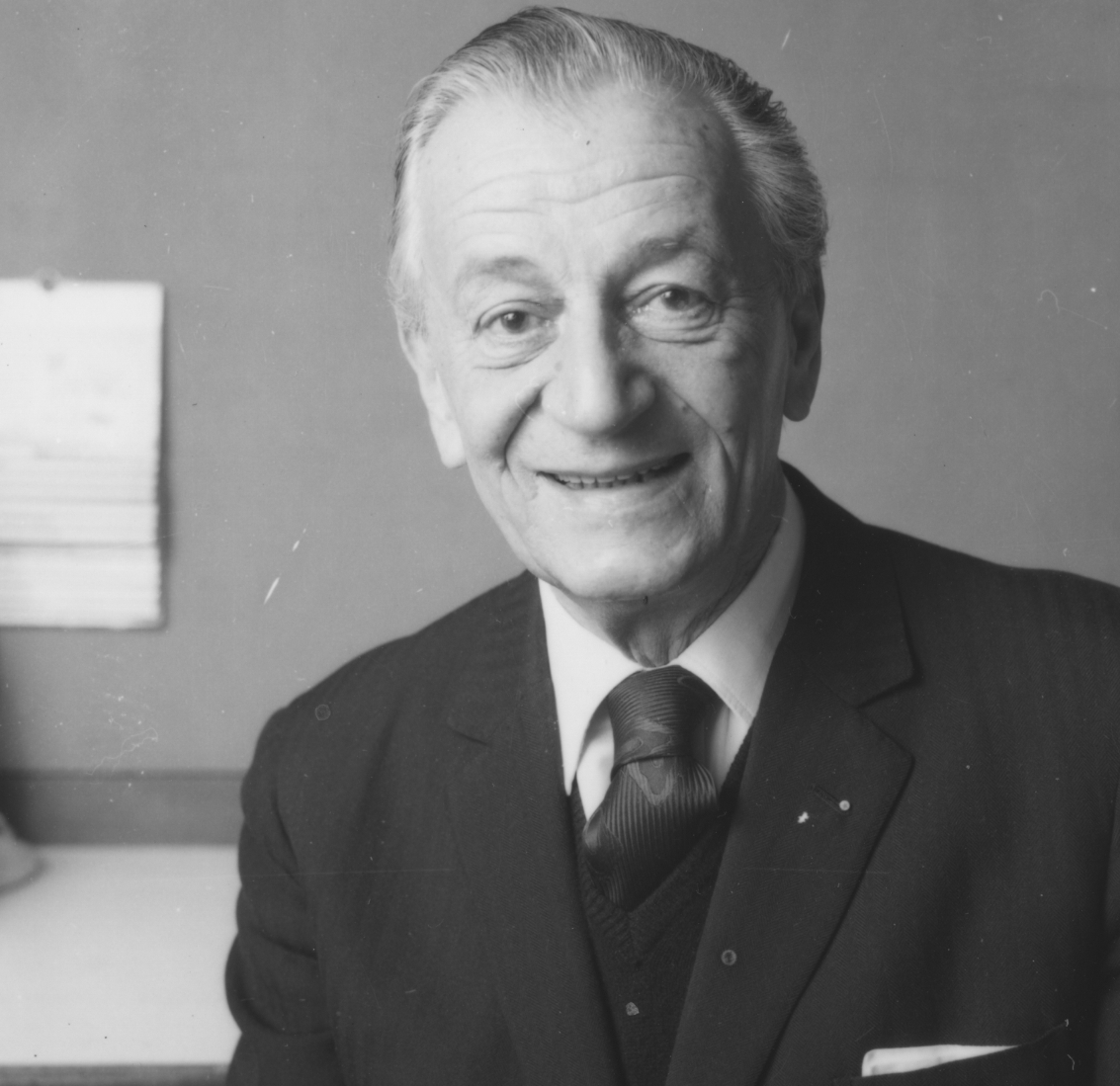
Ivo Lapenna, ca. 1980

Ivo Lapenna (5 November 1909 – 15 December 1987) was a Dalmatian Italian law professor and Esperantist, born in Split in 1909.

== Career ==
Lapenna graduated in 1933 as Doctor of Law from the University of Zagreb. He also studied music at the Zagreb Academy of Music in the same year.

In 1942 Lapenna was involved in the Italian resistance for the duration of the Second World War and after the war became Professor of International Law and International Relations at Zagreb University until 1949.

He then worked in London from 1951 at the School of Slavonic and East European Studies and taught subjects regarding Soviet Law at the University College London with fellow academics, Edward Johnson, Albert K. R. Kiralfi and William E. Butler.

He was a noted Esperanto speaker and served as the President of the World Esperanto Association between 1964 and 1974, and nine years as General Secretary.

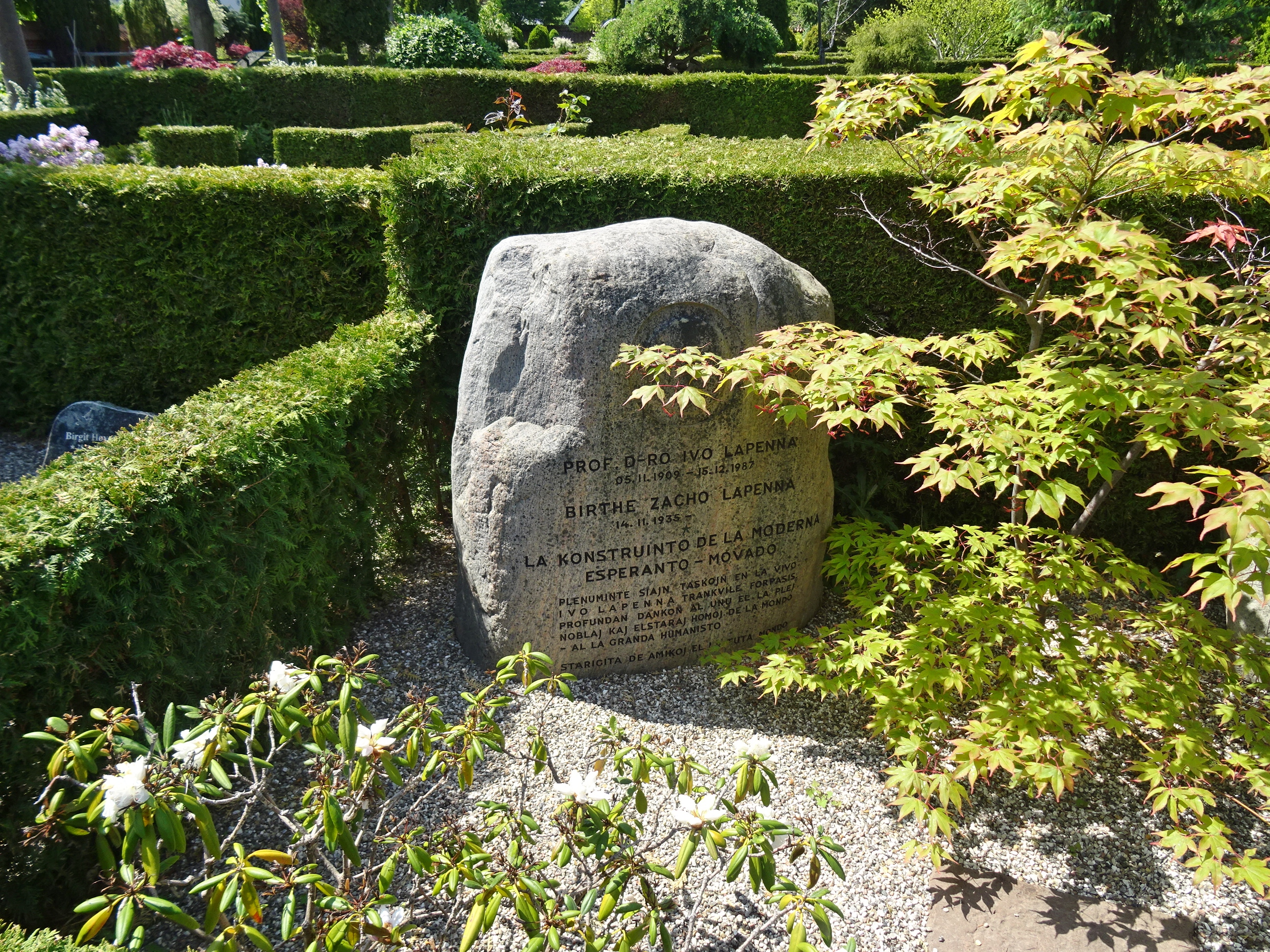
Grave of Ivo Lapenna (1909-1987) in Rødovre Kirkegård in Copenhagen.

Lapenna was highly regarded as an orator in Esperanto, authored a number of books, and was the driving force behind the 1954 Montevideo Resolution in which UNESCO recognized Esperanto. Lapenna was also counsel-advocate at the International Court of Justice at The Hague.

He died in Copenhagen in 1987 and is buried in Rødovre Kirkegård in Copenhagen.

== Works ==
- State and Law: Soviet and Yugoslav Theory. University of London and Athlone Press. 1964.
- Ivo Lapenna, 'The Yugoslav Constitution of 1963', International and Comparative Law Quarterly 18, no. 2 (1969): 469–471.

== See also ==
- President of the Universal Esperanto Association

Universal Esperanto Association
Preceded by Hideo Yagi	President; 1964–1974	Succeeded by Humphrey Tonkin
