= World Esperanto Congress =

Convention of the Esperanto movement

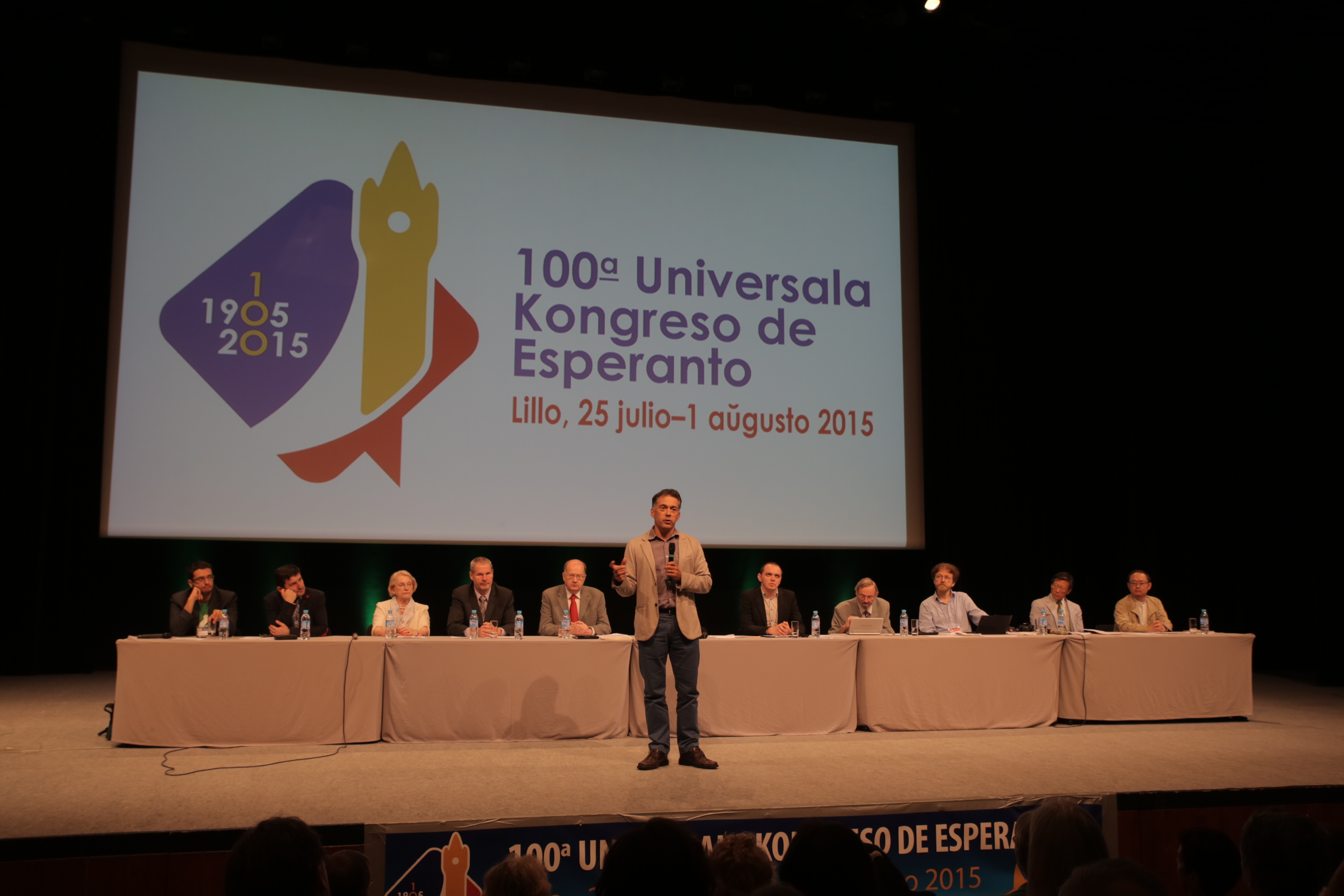
Mark Fettes, president of the World Esperanto Association, during the 100th World Esperanto Congress in Lille (France), 2015

The World Esperanto Congress (Esperanto: Universala Kongreso de Esperanto, UK) is an annual Esperanto convention. It has the longest tradition among international Esperanto conventions, with an almost unbroken run for 119 years. The congresses have been held since August 5, 1905, every year, except during World War I, World War II, and the COVID-19 pandemic. Since the 1920s, the Universal Esperanto Association has been organizing these congresses.

These congresses take place every year and, over the 30 years from 1985 through 2014, have gathered an average of about 2,000 participants (since World War II it has varied from 800 to 6,000, depending on the venue). The average number of countries represented is about 60. Some specialized organizations also gather a few hundred participants in their annual meetings. The World Congress usually takes place in the last week of July or first week of August, beginning and ending on a Saturday (8 days in total). For many years ILERA has operated an amateur radio station during the conventions.

Until 1980, meetings were held in Europe and the United States, with the exception of Japan in 1965. Since then, other countries have been Brazil, Canada, China, Cuba, South Korea, Australia, Israel, Vietnam and Argentina. In 2024, the congress was held in Africa for the first time, in Arusha, Tanzania.

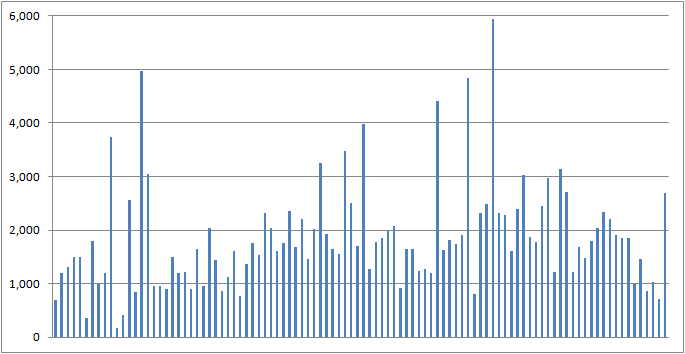
The attendance at each World Esperanto Congress from the 1st in 1905 until the 100th in 2015

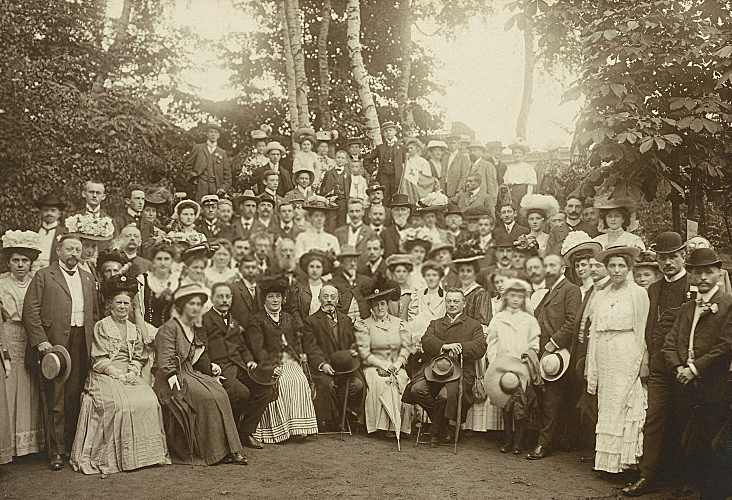
World Esperanto Congress 1908

== History ==
Countries that have hosted the World Esperanto Congress, 1905–2026

Number	Year	City	Country	Number of participants
113	2028	Kaunas	Lithuania	
112	2027	Melbourne	Australia	
111	2026	Graz	Austria	1138
110	2025	Brno	Czech Republic	1132
109	2024	Arusha	Tanzania	854
108	2023	Turin	Italy	1318
107	2022	Montreal	Canada	859
106	2021	Belfast (planned)	online (pandemic)	1853
105	2020	Montreal (planned)	online (pandemic)	2006
104	2019	Lahti	Finland	917
103	2018	Lisbon	Portugal	1567
102	2017	Seoul	South Korea	1173
101	2016	Nitra	Slovakia	1252
100	2015	Lille	France	2698
99	2014	Buenos Aires	Argentina	706
98	2013	Reykjavík	Iceland	1034
97	2012	Hanoi	Vietnam	866
96	2011	Copenhagen	Denmark	1458
95	2010	Havana	Cuba	1002
94	2009	Białystok	Poland	1860
93	2008	Rotterdam	Netherlands	1845
92	2007	Yokohama	Japan	1901
91	2006	Florence	Italy	2209
90	2005	Vilnius	Lithuania	2235
89	2004	Beijing	China	2031
88	2003	Gothenburg	Sweden	1791
87	2002	Fortaleza	Brazil	1484
86	2001	Zagreb	Croatia	1691
85	2000	Tel Aviv	Israel	1212
84	1999	Berlin	Germany	2712
83	1998	Montpellier	France	3133
82	1997	Adelaide	Australia	1224
81	1996	Prague	Czech Republic	2972
80	1995	Tampere	Finland	2443
79	1994	Seoul	South Korea	1776
78	1993	Valencia	Spain	1863
77	1992	Vienna	Austria	3033
76	1991	Bergen	Norway	2400
75	1990	Havana	Cuba	1617
74	1989	Brighton	United Kingdom	2280
73	1988	Rotterdam	Netherlands	2321
72	1987	Warsaw	Poland	5946
71	1986	Beijing	China	2482
70	1985	Augsburg	West Germany	2311
69	1984	Vancouver	Canada	802
68	1983	Budapest	Hungary	4834
67	1982	Antwerp	Belgium	1899
66	1981	Brasília	Brazil	1749
65	1980	Stockholm	Sweden	1807
64	1979	Lucerne	Switzerland	1630
63	1978	Varna	Bulgaria	4414
62	1977	Reykjavík	Iceland	1199
61	1976	Athens	Greece	1266
60	1975	Copenhagen	Denmark	1227
59	1974	Hamburg	West Germany	1651
58	1973	Belgrade	Yugoslavia	1638
57	1972	Portland	United States	923
56	1971	London	United Kingdom	2071
55	1970	Vienna	Austria	1987
54	1969	Helsinki	Finland	1857
53	1968	Madrid	Spain	1769
52	1967	Rotterdam	Netherlands	1265
51	1966	Budapest	Hungary	3975
50	1965	Tokyo	Japan	1710
49	1964	The Hague	Netherlands	2512
48	1963	Sofia	Bulgaria	3472
47	1962	Copenhagen	Denmark	1550
46	1961	Harrogate	United Kingdom	1646
45	1960	Brussels	Belgium	1930
44	1959	Warsaw	Poland	3256
43	1958	Mainz	West Germany	2021
42	1957	Marseille	France	1468
41	1956	Copenhagen	Denmark	2200
40	1955	Bologna	Italy	1687
39	1954	Haarlem	Netherlands	2353
38	1953	Zagreb	Yugoslavia	1760
37	1952	Oslo	Norway	1614
36	1951	Munich	West Germany	2040
35	1950	Paris	France	2325
34	1949	Bournemouth	United Kingdom	1534
33	1948	Malmö	Sweden	1761
32	1947	Bern	Switzerland	1370
World War II
31	1939	Bern	Switzerland	765
30	1938	London	United Kingdom	1602
29	1937	Warsaw	Poland	1120
28	1936	Vienna	Austria	854
27	1935	Rome	Italy	1442
26	1934	Stockholm	Sweden	2042
25	1933	Cologne	Nazi Germany	950
24	1932	Paris	France	1650
23	1931	Kraków	Poland	900
22	1930	Oxford	United Kingdom	1211
21	1929	Budapest	Hungary	1200
20	1928	Antwerp	Belgium	1494
19	1927	Danzig	Free City of Danzig	905
18	1926	Edinburgh	United Kingdom	960
17	1925	Geneva	Switzerland	953
16	1924	Vienna	Austria	3400
15	1923	Nuremberg	Weimar Republic	4963
14	1922	Helsinki	Finland	850
13	1921	Prague	Czechoslovakia	2561
12	1920	The Hague	Netherlands	408
World War I
11	1915	San Francisco	United States	163
10	1914	Paris	France	cancelled due to World War I
9	1913	Bern	Switzerland	1203
8	1912	Kraków	Austria-Hungary	1000
7	1911	Antwerp	Belgium	1800
6	1910	Washington, D.C.	United States	357
5	1909	Barcelona	Spain	1287
4	1908	Dresden	Germany	1500
3	1907	Cambridge	United Kingdom	1317
2	1906	Geneva	Switzerland	1200
1	1905	Boulogne-sur-Mer	France	688

== Statistics ==
=== Countries ===
Countries by number of times as host:

Times hosted	Country	Years hosted
8	Germany (Note: As West Germany in 1951, 1958, 1974 and 1985.)	1908, 1923, 1933, 1951, 1958, 1974, 1985, 1999
8	United Kingdom (Note: Does not include the 2021 Congress, which was originally scheduled to be in Belfast, but was held online due to the COVID-19 pandemic.)	1907, 1926, 1930, 1938, 1949, 1961, 1971, 1989
6	France	1905, 1932, 1950, 1957, 1998, 2015
6	Switzerland	1906, 1913, 1925, 1939, 1947, 1979
6	Netherlands	1920, 1954, 1964, 1967, 1988, 2008
5	Poland (Note: Does not include the 1912 Congress in Kraków, which happened in the territory of Austria-Hungary.)	1931, 1937, 1959, 1987, 2009
4	Belgium	1911, 1928, 1960, 1982
4	Finland	1922, 1969, 1995, 2019
4	Austria	1924, 1936, 1970, 1992
4	Sweden	1934, 1948, 1980, 2003
4	Denmark	1956, 1962, 1975, 2011
4	Italy	1935, 1955, 2006, 2023
3	Spain	1909, 1968, 1993
3	United States	1910, 1915, 1972
3	Hungary	1929, 1966, 1983
3	Czech Republic (Note: As Czechoslovakia in 1921.)	1921, 1996, 2025
2	Norway	1952, 1991
2	Yugoslavia	1953, 1973
2	Bulgaria	1963, 1978
2	Japan	1965, 2007
2	Iceland	1977, 2013
2	China	1986, 2004
2	Canada	1984, 2022
2	Brazil	1981, 2002
2	Cuba	1990, 2010
2	South Korea	1994, 2017
1	Austria-Hungary	1912
1	Danzig	1927
1	Greece	1976
1	Australia	1997
1	Israel	2000
1	Croatia (Note: Does not include the 1953 Congress in Zagreb, which happened in the territory of Yugoslavia.)	2001
1	Lithuania	2005
1	Vietnam	2012
1	Argentina	2014
1	Slovakia	2016
1	Portugal	2018
1	Tanzania	2024

=== Continents ===
Of the 102 congresses that have happened so far, (Note: This excludes the cancelled 1914 congress and future congresses.) 84 were hosted in Europe, 8 in Asia, 6 in North America, 3 in South America, 1 in Australia/Oceania and 1 in Africa.

=== Cities ===
Cities by number of times as host:

Times hosted	City	Years hosted
4	(Austria) Vienna	1924, 1936, 1970, 1992
4	(Denmark) Copenhagen	1956, 1962, 1975, 2011
3	(Belgium) Antwerp	1911, 1928, 1985
3	(Switzerland) Bern	1913, 1939, 1947
3	(France) Paris	1914, 1932, 1950
3	(Hungary) Budapest	1929, 1966, 1983
3	(Poland) Warsaw	1937, 1959, 1987
3	(Netherlands) Rotterdam	1967, 1988, 2008
2	(Switzerland) Geneva	1906, 1925
2	(Poland) Kraków	1912, 1931
2	(Netherlands) The Hague	1920, 1964
2	(Czech Republic) Prague	1921, 1996
2	(Sweden) Stockholm	1934, 1980
2	(United Kingdom) London	1938, 1971
2	(Croatia) Zagreb	1953, 2001
2	(Finland) Helsinki	1969, 1922
2	(Iceland) Reykjavík	1977, 2013
2	(China) Beijing	1986, 2004
2	(Cuba) Havana	1990, 2010
2	(South Korea) Seoul	1994, 2017

The remaining cities hosted the event only once.

== See also ==
- Language festival (Esperanto)
