= Universal Esperanto Association =

International organization of Esperanto speakers

World Esperanto Association
- Universala Esperanto-Asocio
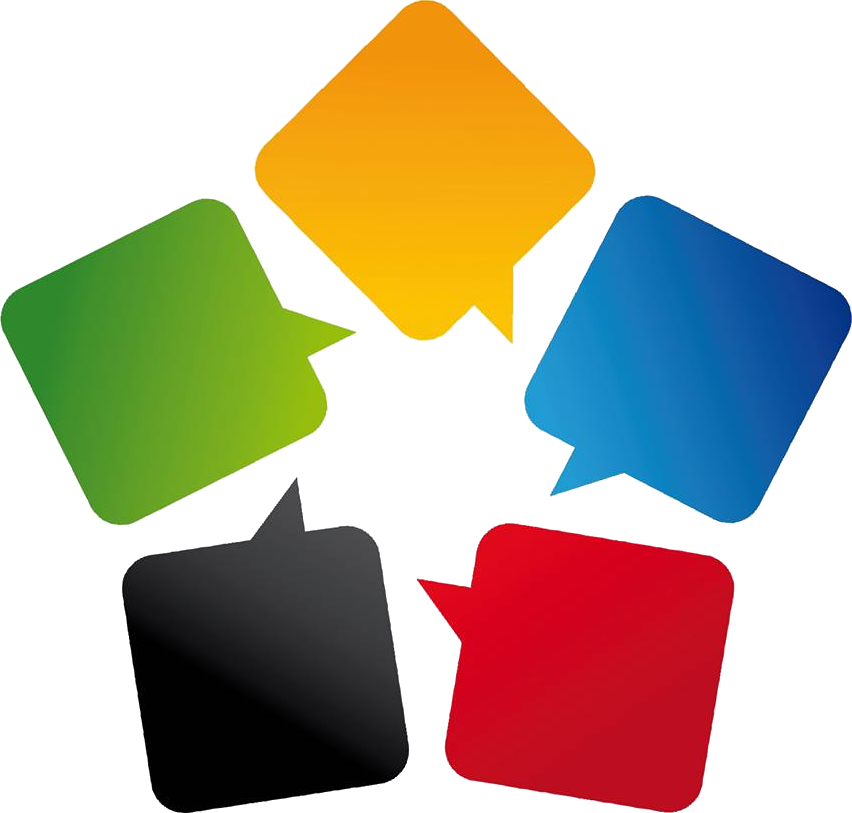
- Logo of the UEA

- Individual members by country 1-100 members 101-200 members 201-300 members 301-400 members
- Abbreviation: UEA
- Formation: 1908; 118 years ago
- Founder: Hector Hodler
- Headquarters: Central Office
- Location: Rotterdam, Netherlands
- Coordinates: 51.9138°N 4.4644°E
- Region served: Earth
- Official language: Esperanto
- President: Fernando Maia
- Vice-President: Seán Ó Riain
- General Director: Aleks Kadar
- Key people: Ivo Lapenna
- Main organ: Central Committee
- Affiliations: United Nations; UNESCO
- Website: uea.org

The World Esperanto Association (Esperanto: Universala Esperanto-Asocio, UEA), also known as the Universal Esperanto Association, is the largest international organization of Esperanto speakers, with 5,501 individual members in 121 countries and 9,215 through national associations (in 2015) in 214 countries. In addition to individual members, 70 national Esperanto organizations are affiliated with UEA. Its current president is Fernando Maia. The magazine Esperanto is the main publication to inform UEA members about everything happening in the Esperanto community.

The UEA was founded in 1908 by the Swiss journalist Hector Hodler and others and is now headquartered in Rotterdam, Netherlands. The organization has official relations with the United Nations and has an office at the United Nations headquarters in New York City.

== Structure and affiliated organizations ==
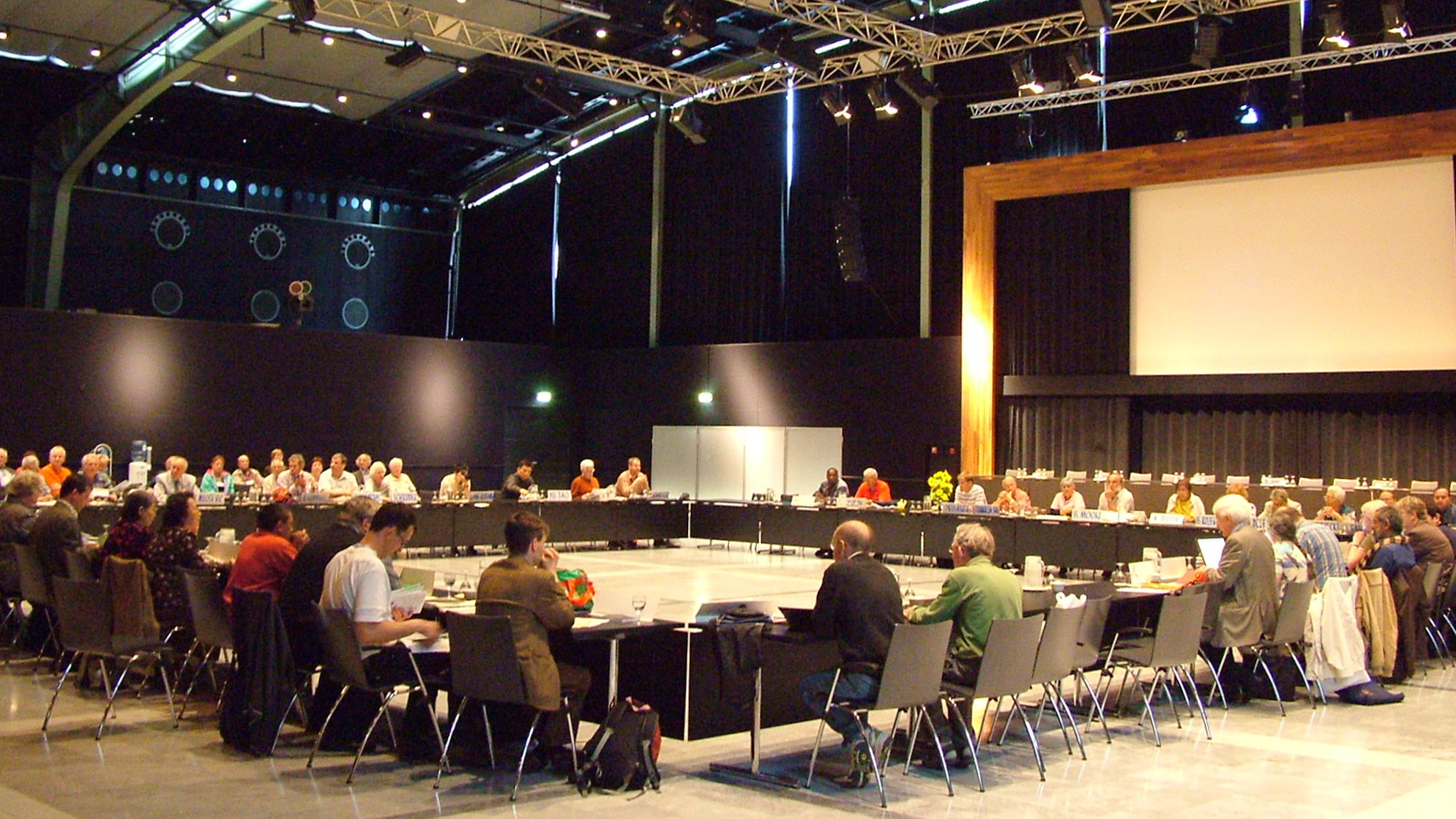
The Komitato, the highest elected body of the UEA, gathering in 2008 at the World Congress of Esperanto

According to its 1980 statutes (Statuto de UEA), the World Esperanto Association has two kinds of members:

- individual members join the association directly, paying a fee to the Rotterdam headquarters or to the chief delegate in their country. These members receive UEA services.
- asociaj membroj (associate members), i.e., members of organizations that joined UEA. These members are administered by their respective organizations, which can be national or specialist bodies. This kind of indirect membership is, for the individual person, more symbolic than direct membership.

The UEA's supervisory board, the Komitato, has members (komitatanoj) elected in three different ways:

- An organization sends at least one komitatano, plus one more for every 1,000 national members, to the Komitato. Most national organizations have only one komitatano.
- For every 1,000 individual members, one member can be chosen to the Komitato.
- Both previous groups may together elect additional komitatanoj, up to one-third of their numbers.

The Komitato serves as a sort of parliament and elects a board, the Estraro. The Estraro installs a general director and sometimes a director as well. The general director and staff work at the UEA headquarters, Oficejo de UEA, in Rotterdam.

Individual members can become a delegito, a 'delegate', who serves as a local contact person for Esperanto and UEA members in their town. A ĉefdelegito (chief delegate) is someone installed also by the UEA headquarters, but with the task to collect and remit membership fees in a given country.

=== Youth section ===
TEJO, the World Esperanto Youth Organization, is the youth section of the UEA. Similar to the World Congress, TEJO organizes an International Youth Congress of Esperanto (Internacia Junulara Kongreso) each year in a different location. The IJK is a week-long event of concerts, presentations, excursions attended by hundreds of young people from all over the world.

The youth section has a Komitato and national and specialist affiliated organizations, just as the UEA itself. A TEJO volunteer works at the Rotterdam headquarters.

=== National organizations ===
The first national Esperanto organization was founded in 1898 in France, originally as a potential international association. In 1903 the second one followed, in Switzerland. Within a couple of years, many of the still existing national organizations came into existence. Since 1933-1934 they have sent representatives to the UEA Komitato, making it a federation of national organizations. In Esperanto these were initially termed as Naciaj Societoj (national societies), but they have subsequently become known as Landaj Asocioj (country associations).

When UEA accepted national organizations in 1933-1934 for the first time, it required them to

- have at least 100 national members,
- be 'organized in an orderly manner',
- be neutral, meaning having no political or religious aims, and being open to all citizens of the country.

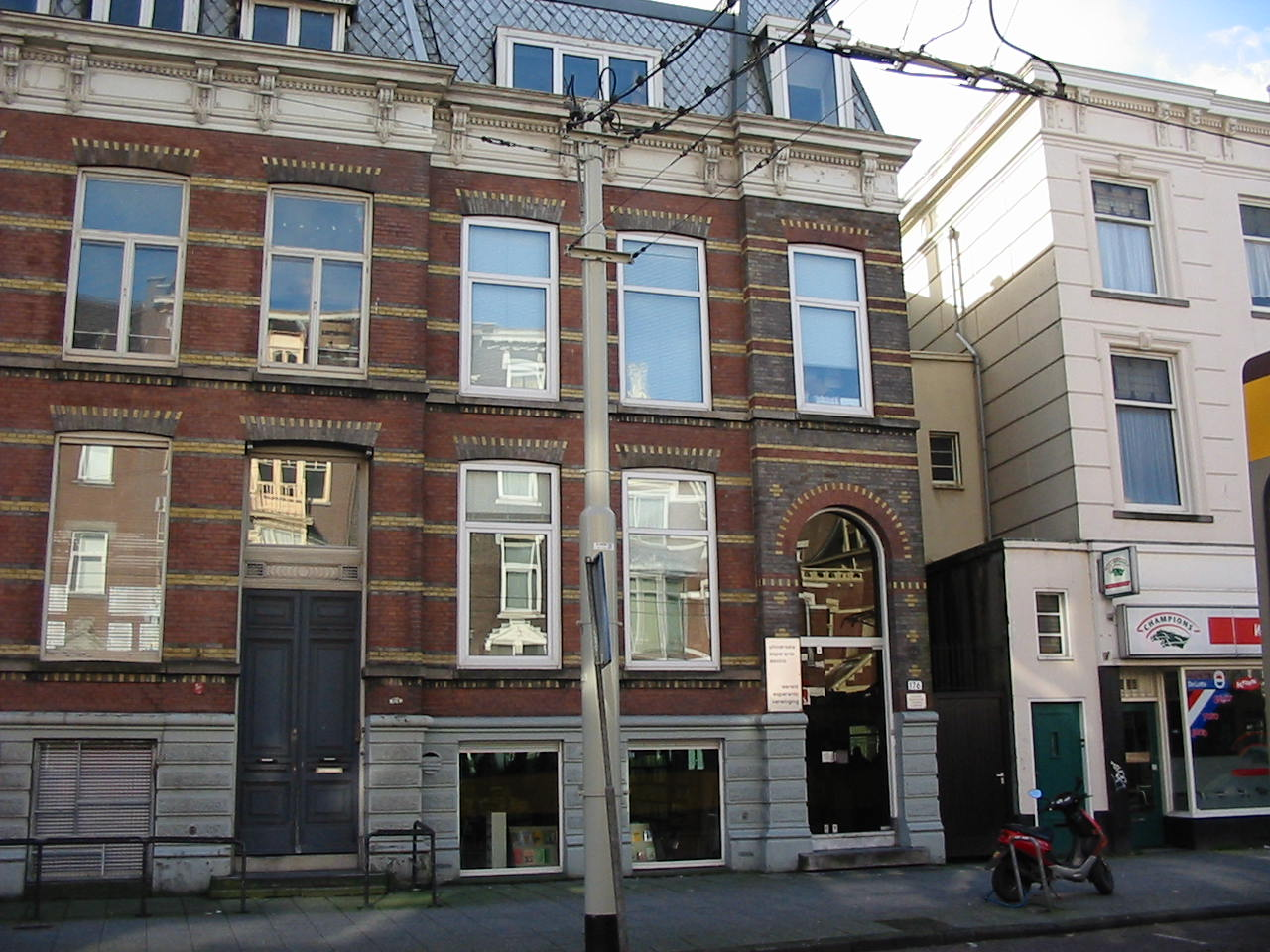
The Central Office of the UEA in Rotterdam

Especially the last prerequisite caused serious problems, e.g. to the German national association submitting to Nazi Party rule. Decades later, in 1959, the Cuban association was refused because its statutes respected the leading role of the Communist Party of Cuba. In 1980, the UEA statutes were altered to specify that while a national organization need not be neutral itself, it must respect the neutrality of UEA.

=== Specialist organizations ===
Specialist organizations are similar to the national organizations. They are divided into two groups:

- neutral organizations, which can join UEA in the same way as national organizations. In Esperanto they are called aliĝintaj fakaj asocioj (affiliated specialist associations). Examples are the Esperanto physicians and the Esperanto teachers.
- other organizations in (official) collaboration with UEA. They do not send representatives to the Komitato but can have a room at the World Congress. Examples are Esperantist vegetarians, Esperantist Catholics and Esperantist communists. Some of them choose not to be affiliated because of financial reasons; others are non-neutral and therefore cannot join UEA.

The youth section TEJO has two affiliated specialist groups, the Esperantist cyclists and Esperantist rock music fans.

== Activities ==
=== Publications ===
UEA publishes Esperanto, the most important Esperanto periodical. It was started in 1905 by Paul Berthelot, three years before UEA was founded. UEA founder Hector Hodler took it over in 1907 and made it the official UEA magazine in 1908. In 1920 he left the magazine to the association. Since the 1950s it has had a paid editor-in-chief. Next to Esperanto, the Yearbook (Jarlibro de UEA) which published for 108 years, was the oldest continuous publication of the association.

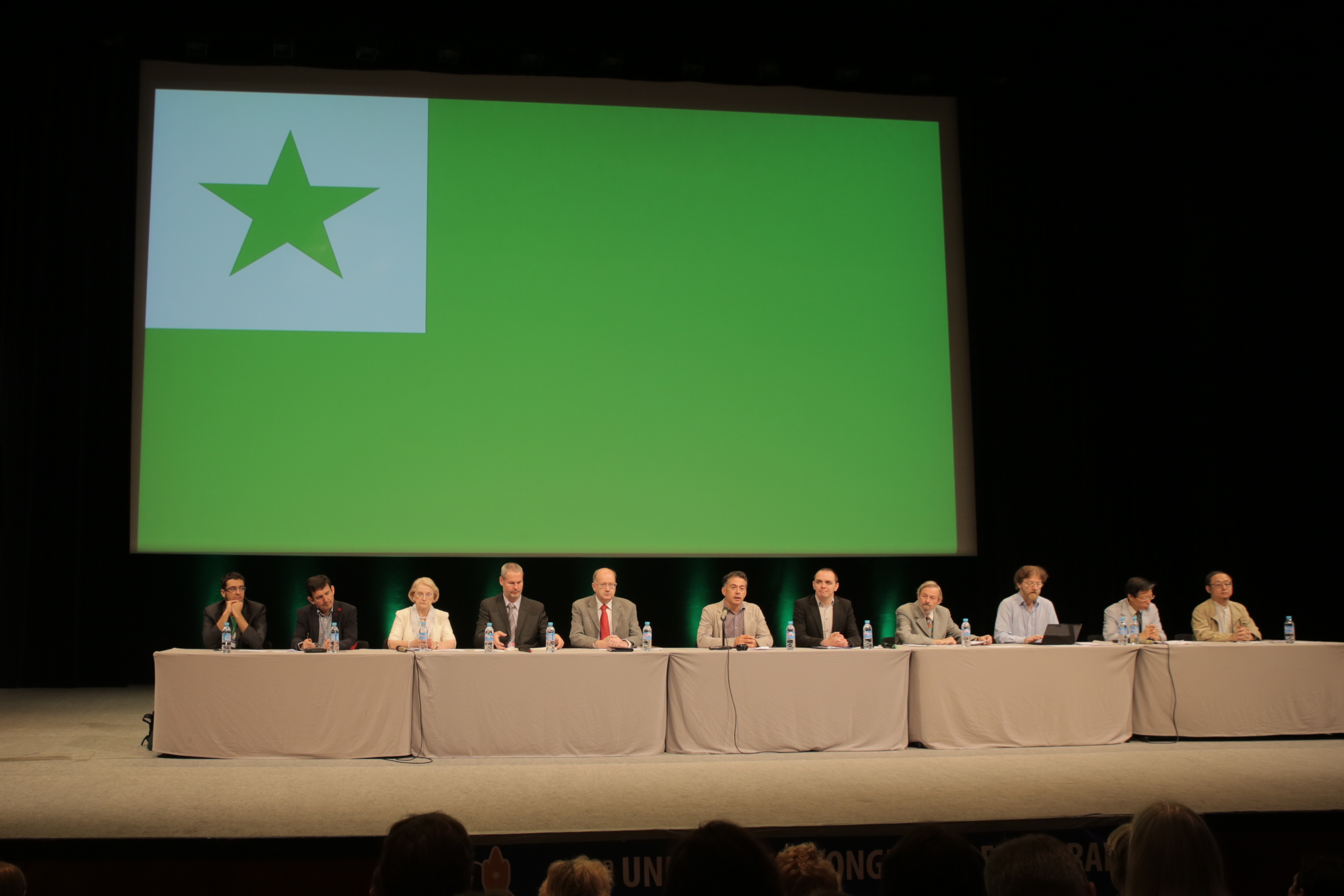
UEA board members and other distinguished UEA members at the inauguration of the 2015 congress

UEA publishes books and has the largest mail-order Esperanto bookstore in the world (with over 6,000 book titles, CDs and other items). It also maintains an information centre and an important Esperanto library, called the Hector Hodler Library. The organisation has a network of local representatives from around the world, the Delegita Reto, who are available to provide information about their geographical area or professional field.

=== Conventions ===
The yearly World Esperanto Congress (Universala Kongreso de Esperanto), which attracts 1,500–3,000 people to a different city each year, is held under the direction of UEA. The first congress took place in 1905, and since 1933–1934 the UEA has had responsibility for the annual event. Since 2009, World Congresses have been held in Białystok, Poland, the hometown of L. L. Zamenhof, the creator and guiding spirit of Esperanto, as well as in Havana, Copenhagen, Hanoi, Reykjavík, Buenos Aires, Lille, Nitra, Seoul, Lisbon, Lahti, Montreal and Turin. In 2020 and 2021 the Congresses were held virtually due to the COVID-19 pandemic. Congresses are scheduled for Arusha, Tanzania in 2024 and Brno, Czech Republic in 2025.

Twice a year, in spring and autumn, UEA headquarters in Rotterdam holds an Open Day.

=== International organizations ===
In addition to the UN and UNESCO, UEA also has consultative relations with UNICEF and the Council of Europe, and a general working relationship with the Organization of American States. It works in an official capacity with the International Organization for Standardization (ISO) as an A-liaison to ISO/TC37. UEA is active in public information in the European Union and, as necessary, at other interstate and international organizations and conferences. The organisation is a member of the European Language Council, a common forum of universities and language associations for the awareness of languages and cultures inside and outside the European Union.

In May 2011, UEA officially became an Associate Member of the International Information Centre for Terminology (Infoterm).

=== Grabowski Prize ===
The Grabowski Prize is a prize awarded to young authors writing in Esperanto by the Antoni Grabowski Foundation, part of the World Esperanto Association (UEA). It is named after Antoni Grabowski, who has been called "the father of Esperanto poetry". The awards for the first three winners are $700, $300 and $150 respectively.

==== Past recipients ====
Ulrich Becker, a publisher of literature in and about Esperanto and of interlinguistic literature in general, was awarded the Grabowski Prize (Premio Grabowski) in 2005 for his achievements in publishing in Esperanto. Among other works, he is the publisher of the thrice-yearly periodical of Esperanto belles-lettres, Beletra Almanako.

== History ==
=== The founding years of the Esperanto movement, 1888–1914 ===
The modern UEA is the result of a decades-long process of several attempts to give the Esperanto movement a sound foundation. The first Esperanto associations were local clubs, of which the one in Nuremberg, Germany, is considered the first (1888). From 1898, national Esperanto associations were found in several countries, with the French one being the first. In 1903 followed the Swiss association; then in 1904 the British, in 1906 the German and Swedish, etc.

The founder of Esperanto, L. L. Zamenhof, wished for an international association to come into existence, but the first world congress of 1905 produced only a general manifesto about the essence and neutrality of the movement. The organizing team passed the torch to organizers of a next congress the year after, which eventually created a Konstanta Kongresa Komitato (Permanent Congress Committee). It consisted of two members representing the previous congress, two for the current one, and two for the next following congress.

Esperantists agreed that the whole movement must support two common international tasks: international documentation, propaganda in countries without movements of their own, lobbying at international organizations, organizing the world congresses, etc. Esperantists did disagree on which or what organization should be responsible for these tasks, how it should collect the money and how it should decide on spending the money.

In 1906, the French Gen. Hyppolyte Sebert created his Esperantista Centra Oficejo (Central Office of the Esperantists) in Paris. It collected information on the movement and published an Oficiala Gazeto. In spite of this 'official' name, the office was a purely private enterprise of Sebert, but he tried to engender support from the various national associations.

One year later, at the Geneva world congress, Zamenhof created a Lingva Komitato (Language Committee), the basis of the later Akademio de Esperanto. It consisted of some eminent speakers from several countries and was intended to safeguard the evolution of Esperanto; members were elected for a nine-year term.

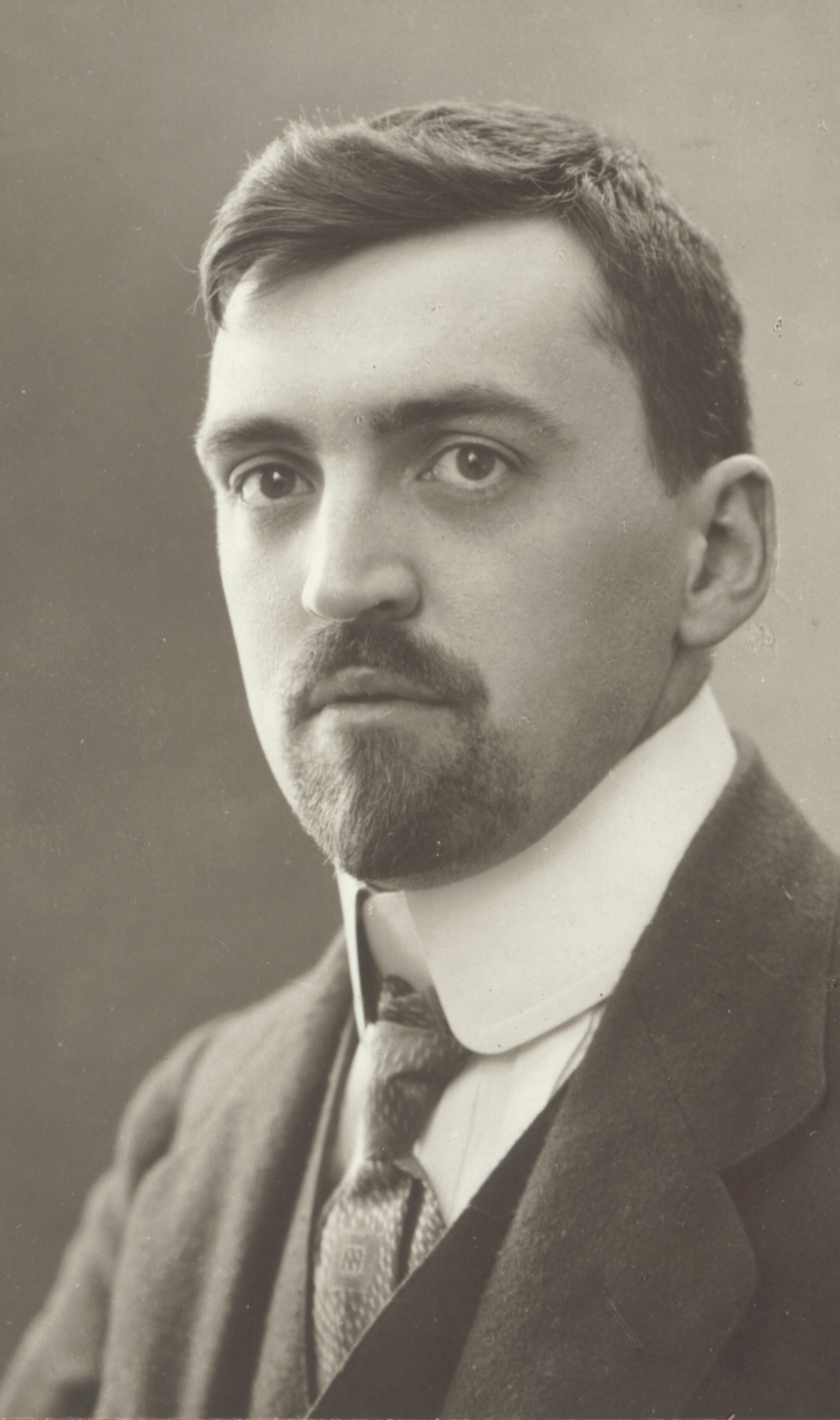
Hector Hodler, son of famous Swiss painter Ferdinand Hodler, in 1920

In 1908, a group of young Esperanto speakers founded an international association based on individual, direct membership: Universala Esperanto-Asocio, based in Geneva. According to Hector Hodler and his followers, an international cause such as Esperanto must be supported by a unitary, truly international association, and UEA members should found separate organizations on national and local levels.

The national (and local) associations initially saw the UEA not as a supporting resource but as a threat, as undesirable competition. They were afraid of a division in the movement between the traditional groups on the one hand and the UEA members on the other. Also, propaganda and lessons were the task of the national associations (often federations of local groups). They did not like the perspective that new Esperantists, created by the traditional groups, would be picked up by UEA.

The national associations then tried to build up an international organizational level of their own. A first attempt took the form of rajtigitaj delegitoj to the congresses in 1911 and 1912 (not to be confused with the UEA delegitoj); an Internacia Unuiĝo de Esperantistaj Societoj (International Union of Esperanto associations, 1913-1914) was a second attempt. This evolutionary thread ceased in 1914 with the breakout of World War I, which forced the movement as a whole to pause many of its activities, and the Congresses planned for 1916, 1917, 1918 and 1919 were cancelled.

=== UEA in its first years ===
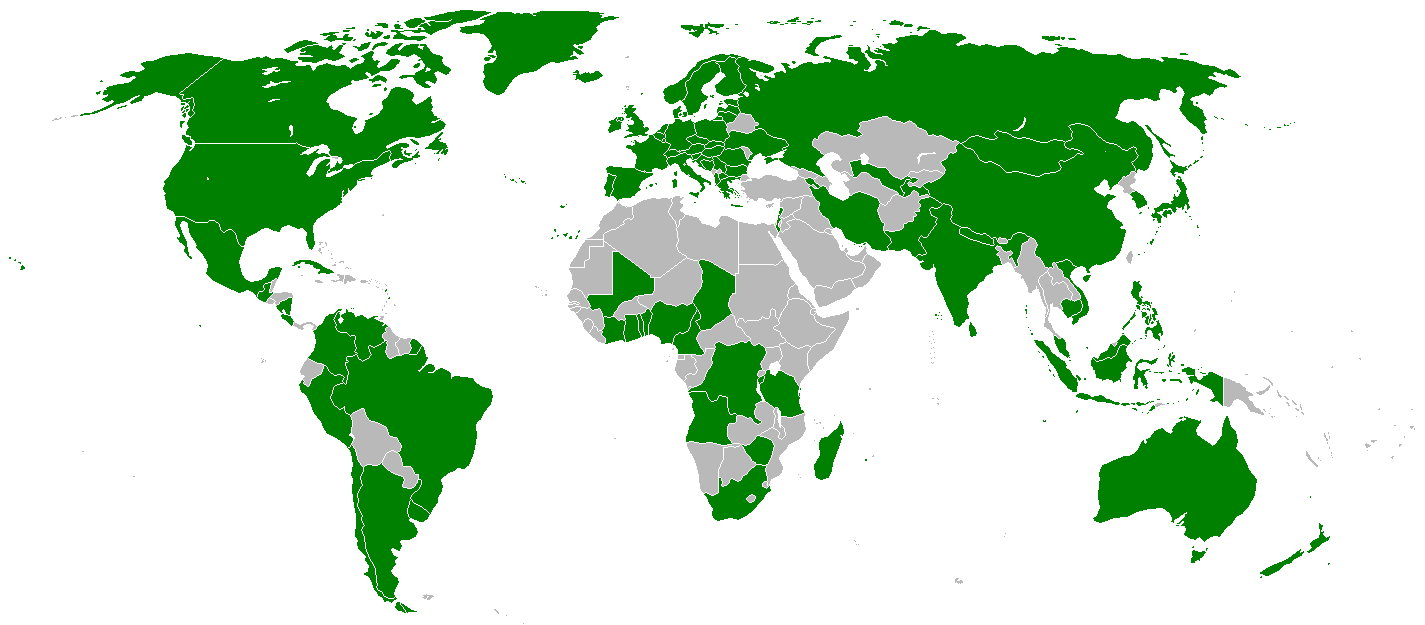
Countries that joined the UEA are shown in green.

The original UEA was purely based on individual membership. The members in a given locality, e.g. a town, were supposed to have UEA member conventions and elect a delegito (plural delegitoj), a delegate. The delegate was tasked with collecting membership fees and sending them to the Geneva headquarters, and was expected to represent the other local members on the international level. The totality of delegates held referendums, and they elected the Komitato.

The Komitato board initially had eight (since 1910: ten) members, with a president and a vice-president. One of the board members served as director; from 1908 to 1920 this was Hector Hodler. The director installed delegates in towns with fewer than 20 members. These were 94 percent of the delegates, so the UEA was not so much a democracy but a circular, self-renewing system of cooptation. (Since 1920, the Komitato was enlarged, becoming a kind of parliament, and a board with the name Estraro was established.)

Hodler was still the owner and publisher of his magazine Esperanto, published every second week. From the beginning, UEA had a Yearbook — Jarlibro — with basic information about the association and with the addresses of the delegates.

Esperanto speakers are divided by different subjects they are interested in. In those early years, some specialist organizations developed — for example, the Universala Medicina Esperanto-Asocio of 1908. Hodler tried to give those 'specialists' a home in the UEA. Instead of founding specialized associations of their own, with separate bulletins and conventions, he wanted them to be UEA members and have 'fakoj' (compartments). He also thought of partner organizations — for example, hotels which would give a discount to UEA members in exchange for an advertisement in the UEA Yearbook.

Hodler projected an organization fit to contain tens or hundreds of thousands of members, the so-called esperantianoj (UEA members, in opposition to the simple esperantistoj, Esperanto speakers). In fact, UEA never exceeded a membership of 10,000. The association adopted several new statutes until 1920.

=== Attempts at organization in the interbellum, 1920–1933 ===
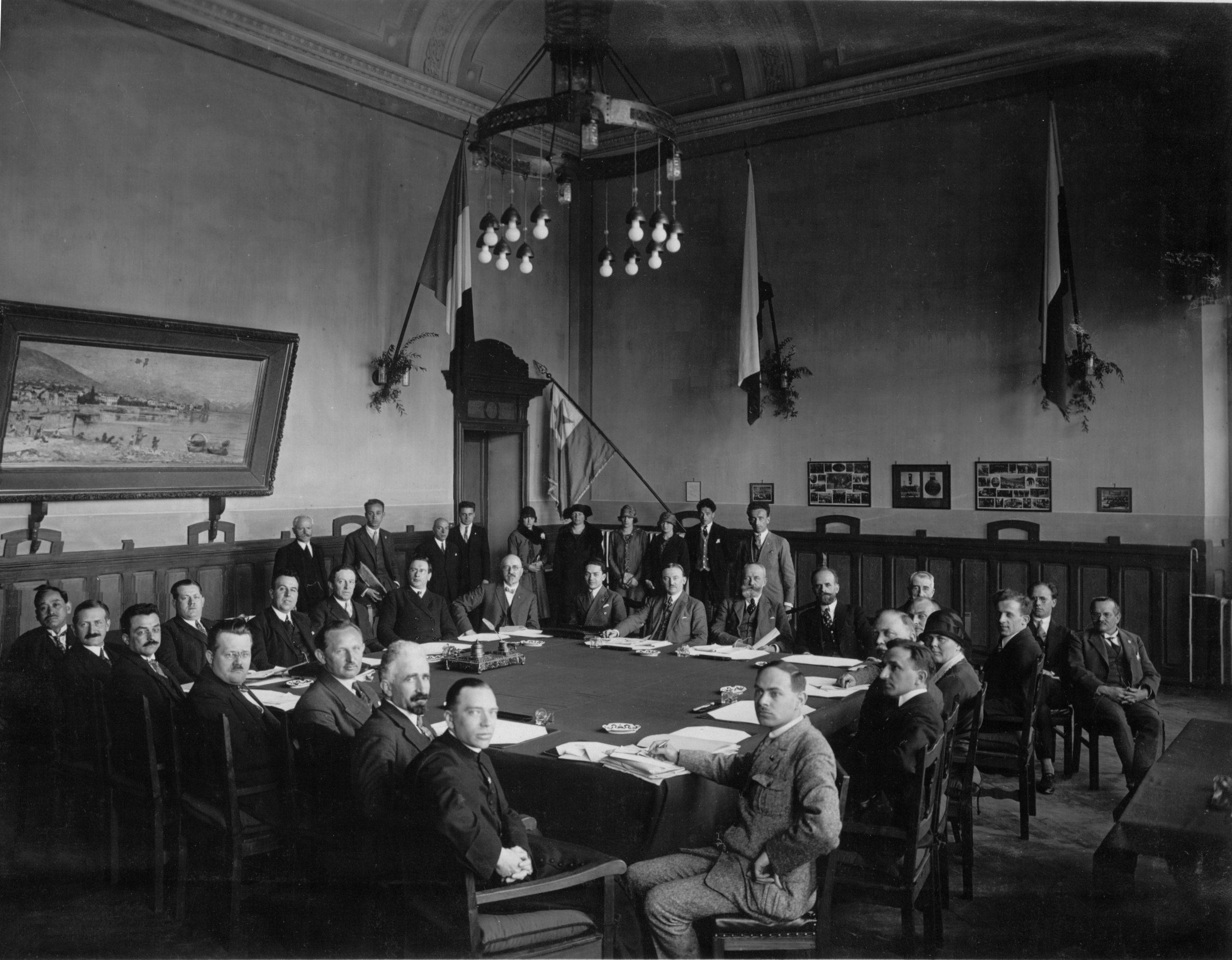
Meeting of the international Esperanto leaders in Locarno, Switzerland, in 1926 (some months after the famous Locarno Conference of the European political leaders)

In 1920, the Esperanto movement gathered again for the first time since the war, at The Hague congress. The discussions eventually created the so-called Helsinki system, on which UEA and the national associations agreed at the congress of 1922 in the Finnish capital. This system defined the movement to consist of these 'official' entities:

- Universala Esperanto Asocio (UEA), the international members' association in Geneva; it paid contributions to a common budget
- Konstanta Komitato de la Naciaj Societoj (Ko-Ro, Permanent Committee of the National Associations), a newly created body to represent the national associations; it collected contributions from the national associations for the common budget
- Internacia Centra Komitato de la Esperanto-Movado (ICK, International Central Committee of the Esperanto Movement), a newly created six-member body elected by UEA and Ko-Ro together; administering the common budget and doing the operational business for common international tasks, also representing the movement as a whole. It had a paid secretary.
- the congress committee, administered and subsidized by the ICK
- the language committee (later the Academy of Esperanto), subsidized by the ICK

This Helsinki system lasted for only a couple of years. The heads of the movement saw that at the world congresses there was considerable overlap, and three separate groups were discussing essentially the same subjects: the Komitato of UEA, the Ko-Ro of the national associations and the six members of the ICK. From 1929, they all had a joint gathering called Ĝenerala Estraro (general board). A number of proposals came up in the movement to reform the organization.

The final blow to the Helsinki system came in 1932 when UEA did not pay its contributions for the common budget, and the same was true for some of the national associations. The British, German and French associations, the largest ones, took up the initiative to found a new organization, Universala Federacio Esperantista (World Federation of Esperantists), as a federation of national associations. This new organization had scarcely come into existence when in early 1933 the UEA and the national organizations agreed on a complete reform of the movement.

=== The 'new UEA' and the schism of 1936 ===
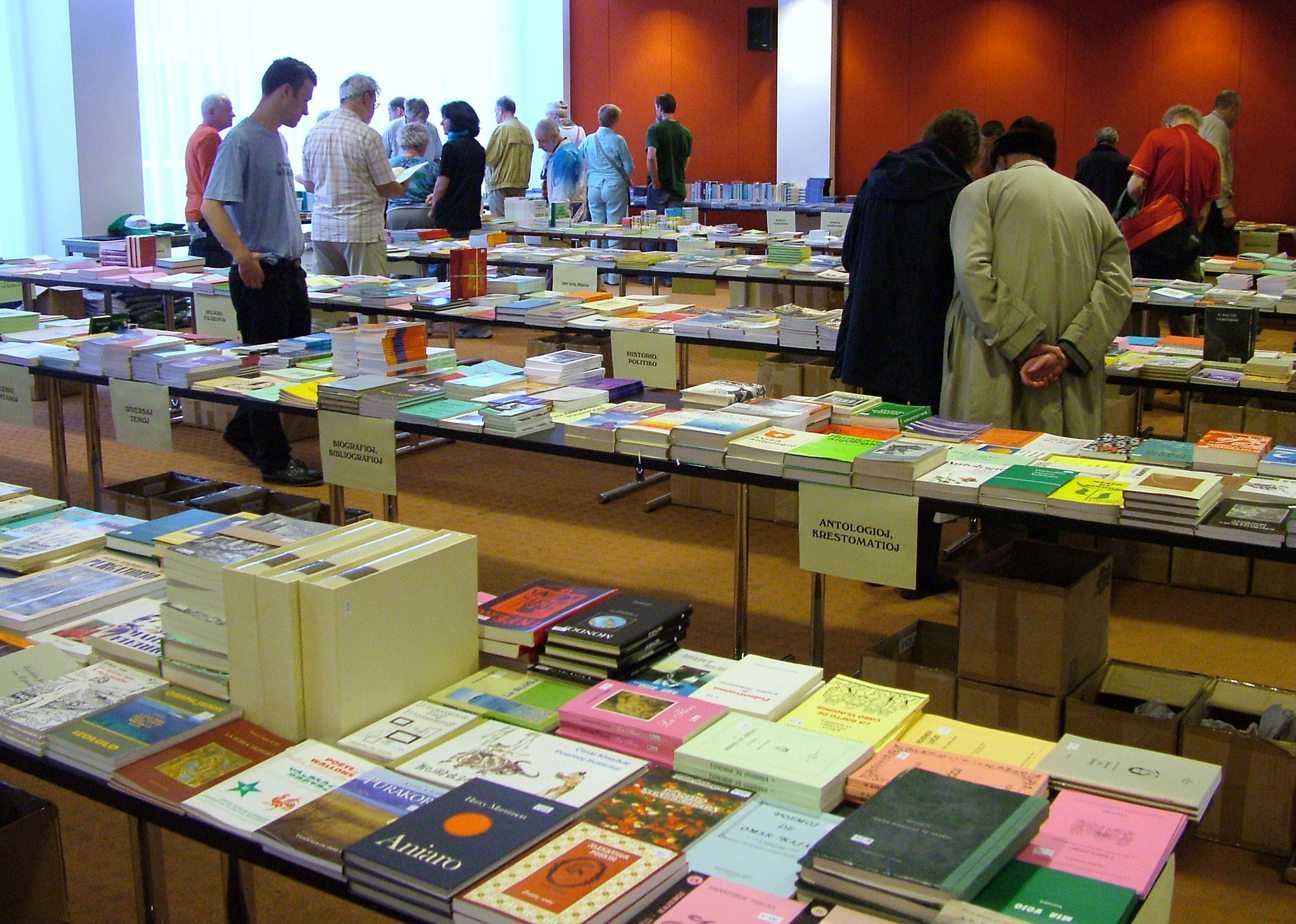
UEA book shop at the 2008 World Congress of Esperanto

In 1933, at the Cologne congress, UEA and the national organizations made UEA the common or umbrella organization of the international Esperanto movement. In 1934 the UEA members accepted new UEA statutes. The 'new UEA', as it was called, was (and still is) a federation of national associations but also of individual members directly administered by UEA.

The highest organ of UEA was the Komitato. It gathered representatives from the national organizations; the numbers depended on the size of the national organization. Other representatives were elected by the delegates, depending on the number of delegates. A third group of representatives was elected by the two first groups; this opened the possibility to include 'experts' who were not linked to a national organization or popular among the delegates. Since 1947, one speaks of the komitatanoj A (from the national organizations), the komitatanoj B (from the delegates, later members) and the komitatanoj C (those indirectly elected).

As the representatives of the national organizations by far outnumbered the others, it is right to call UEA in essence a federation. But all officeholders of UEA had to be individual members, and the core services of the association, such as the Yearbook, were still reserved to individual members.

UEA since then is the legal heir of the former Helsinki organizations, such as the International Central Committee. The association since then also organizes the annual World Congress of Esperanto.

Although in 1933-1934 it first seemed that the transition could happen in harmony, at the 1934 congress in Stockholm some UEA functionaries were not re-elected. In anger, UEA president Eduard Stettler and others resigned. The new board with president Louis Bastien faced a catastrophic financial situation and decided in early 1936 to depart Geneva for London. In London, the capable activist Cecil C. Goldsmith wanted to become the new director (secretary), and for certain currency reasons UEA could exist significantly more cheaply in Britain than in Switzerland.

A hastily organized and secret campaign, led by former president Stettler, made it impossible for the Bastien-led board to legally move the headquarters away from Switzerland. After several months of discussions and a referendum, the Bastien board members and the Komitato members left the UEA altogether and established, in September 1936, a new association, the Internacia Esperanto-Ligo (IEL). Nearly all national organizations and individual members followed. In Geneva there remained a near-deserted shell of the UEA, in which the old leaders once again took power, the so-called Genevan UEA.

=== UEA after World War II ===
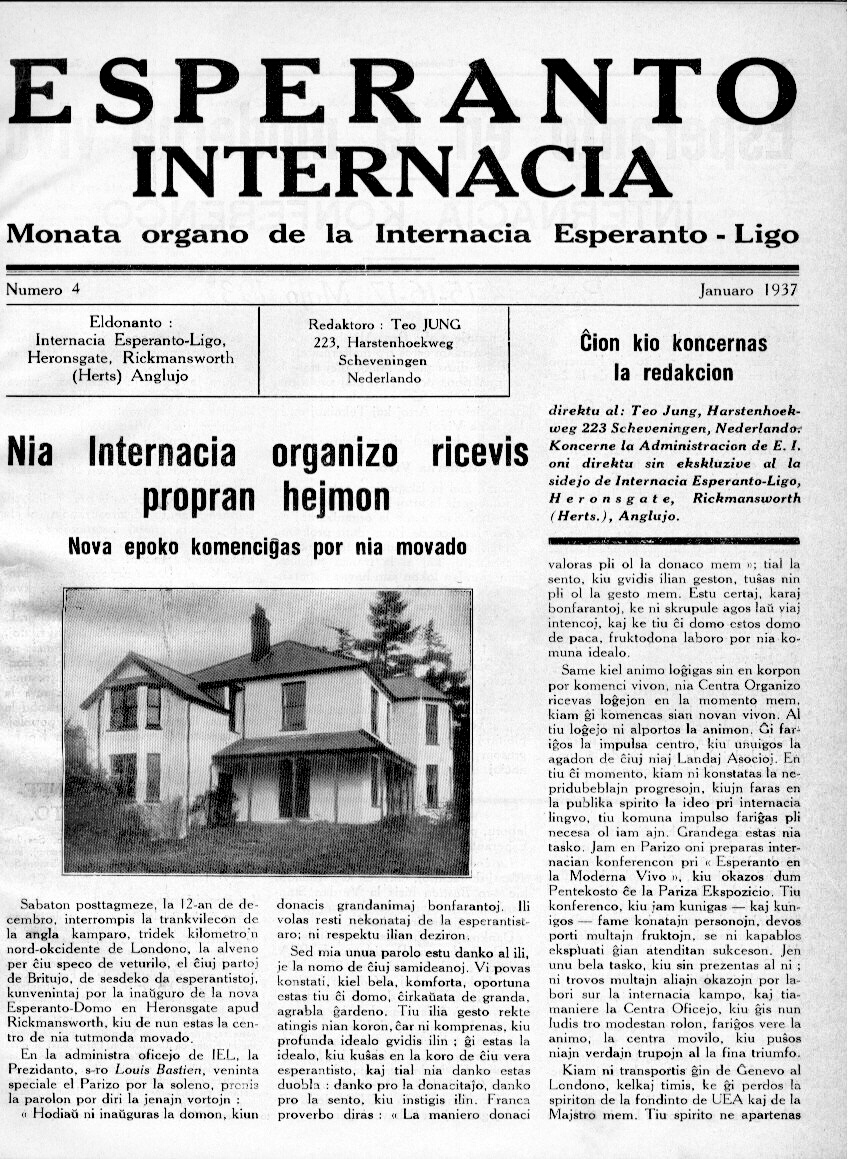
Front page of the IEL organ in 1937, announcing a house in Heronsgate becoming the IEL headquarters

The international Esperanto movement survived World War II with its IEL headquarters in Heronsgate, near London. Hans Jakob, from the Genevan UEA, tricked the IEL board into a merger of IEL and the rump Genevan UEA, falsely stating that the wealthy Eduard Stettler had left a huge sum to the UEA.

Ivo Lapenna, a London law professor originally coming from Croatia, in the 1950s reshaped the association significantly. The office moved from Heronsgate to Rotterdam, the board since then has a general secretary, the Esperanto editor is a paid position. After 1956, the association in 1980 was again (and since then for the last time) given new statutes.

In the decades after the war, the staff grew. Before the war, it was common to have a director with only one or two assistants. After the war, the UEA at times employed ten or more people (e.g. a congress manager, a book seller, a librarian.)

Lapenna introduced a prestige policy, for which he was willing to spend considerable funds. This included signature campaigns for Esperanto and efforts to make UNESCO support Esperanto in a moral way, which Lapenna accomplished in 1954 at the UNESCO conference in Montevideo, Uruguay. This made him famous in Esperanto circles as the hero of Montevideo. After having served for more than 30 years on the board of UEA, Lapenna left the association in 1974 and created a rival organization (Neŭtrala Esperanto-Movado).

During the Cold War, UEA had to deal with the difficulty of having national organizations and individual members in communist countries. Additionally, the work of Esperanto organizations in Western countries was sometimes influenced by the Cold War: In the early 50s, the American Esperanto leader George Allan Connor denounced dissenting members of his national organization as communists. His national organization and he as an individual were eventually thrown out of UEA. The collapse of the Soviet Union and its allied states between 1989 and 1991 completely changed the international situation.

== See also ==
- Category:Presidents of the World Esperanto Association
- World Esperanto Youth Organization (TEJO)
- Sennacieca Asocio Tutmonda, the leftist global Esperanto organization
- World Congress of Esperanto
- Terminologia Esperanto-Centro

== Sources ==
- Forster, Peter Glover: The Esperanto Movement, Diss. Hull 1977, The Hague et al. 1982 (Hull 1977)
- Lins, Ulrich: Utila Estas Aliĝo. Tra la unua jarcento de UEA, Universala Esperanto-Asocio. Rotterdam 2008
- Sikosek, Marcus: Die neutrale Sprache. Eine politische Geschichte des Esperanto-Weltbundas. Diss. Utrecht 2006. Skonpres, Bydgoszcz 2006
