= Mauro Nervi =

Italian poet in the Esperanto language (born 1959)

Mauro Nervi (born 1959) is an Italian poet in the Esperanto language.

Nervi was born in La Spezia, a port town in northern Italy. A student of medicine, he gained his M.D. as a general surgeon. Since 1984 he has worked in the department of surgery at the University of Pisa. Afterwards, he received a Ph.D. in 1994 in German and a Ph.D. in classical literature in 1999 from the same university. Since 1995 he has written critical material on Kafka, Goethe, Kleist and Holderlin in cooperation with the Department of German Studies.

Nervi married Angela in 1992 and has two daughters, Serena (2002) and Dorabella (2005). He is now interested in philosophy and logic.

== Works ==
Nervi first gained renown for his poems when he was only 18 years old, and 1978 saw the publication of his first collection La turoj de l' ĉefurbo ("The Towers of the Capital"). Although in retrospect some parts are immature, here the young Nervi already showed impressive skill. From his knowledge of classical literature came several poems from this volume, including a poetic drama based on the murder of Agamemnon by Clytemnestra, and a cycle of seven poems, each for one of the Muses.

After the publication of his first book, Nervi continued to write poetry, which appeared in several literary reviews including Fonto and Literatura Foiro. In 1986 his translation in Esperanto of Il repertorio della memoria by Eugenio Montale was used as the introduction to Spomenka Štimec's novel Ombro sur interna pejzaĝo. 1996 saw the appearance of his translation of Franz Kafka's The Metamorphosis.

Nervi's second collection, Havenoj ("Ports") was published in 2001. Leaving behind the classical themes of La turoj de l' ĉefurbo, Havenoj contains much sea imagery and was also inspired in part by his studies of German literature, for which he received his second doctorate.

For his poetry Nervi has gained several literary prizes.

== List of works ==
- La turoj de l’ ĉefurbo (1978)
- Maurizio CAPRILE: La blinda ermito : poemkolekto (translation, 1979)
- Franz KAFKA: La Metamorfozo (translation, 1996)
- Havenoj (poems, 2001)
