= Esperanto in Korea =

International auxiliary language in Korea

The use of Esperanto in the Korean Peninsula can be traced back to the early 20th century.

== History ==
=== Early spread and Japanese oppression ===
The earliest record of Esperanto in the Korean peninsula is in a Japanese newspaper which says that Gojong of Korea learnt basic phrases in Esperanto in 1906. The first Esperantisto is considered to be Hong Myong-hui who learned Esperanto in 1910 in China and selected his pen name as "ByeokCho" which means the "first green man (referencing the fact the color of the Esperanto movement green and proclaiming him as first Esperantist)". The organized Esperanto movement in Korea is considered to have first started with the establishment of the public learning sessions held at the YMCA led by Kim Ok in 1920. The learners of Esperanto in this session founded the Korean Esperanto Association in the same year (Then known as the Joseon Esperanto Association). In the founding issue of the magazine Peheoh (Ruins) in 1920, Kim Ok first published a poem in Esperanto called "La ruino" and published a series on self study of the Esperanto language on the magazine "Gaebyeok" in 1922, linking his literary work with his project to spread the Esperanto movement. The first reading book in Esperanto was published in 1923 by Sin Bong Jo, and a serialized lesson on Esperanto and a fixed article just for Esperanto was published in the Korean newspaper Dong-a Ilbo in 1924. Kim Ok also had significant contributions in the translations of contemporary Korean literature at the times like the "Potato" of Kim Dong In and published many theses in Esperanto. In 1937, a magazine written fully in Esperanto called the "Korean Esperantisto" was founded by Hong Hyong-ui, but soon became defunct due to the decision of the Japanese authorities to oppress the publication.

=== History of Esperanto in South Korea ===
In 1947, Seok Joo-myung, a Korean academic who studies butterflies, published many theses about butterflies in Esperanto and an international textbook of Esperanto. From the 1950s after the Korean War to the 1960s, the Esperanto movement in South Korea was scattered in Busan Seoul and Daegu, until the movements united as part of the Korean Esperanto Association in Seoul in 1975, which ensured the spread of the Esperanto language in different universities. A promotional magazine "La Espero El KoreUio" was founded by Han Moo-hyup in 1976, and continued its publication until 1994, providing many translations of Korean literature. The Korean Esperanto dictionaries and Esperanto-Korean dictionaries were separately published in 1969 and 1982. In 1985, Esperanto became an official subject in Dankook University.

=== History of Esperanto in North Korea ===
Esperanto in North Korea can be traced back to lot of Korean communists and anarchists who learned the Esperanto language during their independence movements. In 1925, the Korean Proletariat Artists' Federation adopted the acronym KAPF, based on the Esperanto name "Korea Artista Proleta Federatio". Pak Hon-yong, who led the Workers' Party of South Korea, wrote works in Esperanto. The Esperanto movement in North Korea experienced a decline after Pak was purged as a result of his mistakes during the Korean War, but the Korean Esperanto Association in North Korea was founded in 1959. The Korean Esperanto Dictionary was published in North Korea in 1964, however current usage of Esperanto in North Korea is limited. In July 1989, delegates of the World Esperanto Youth Organization (TEJO) visited North Korea for the 13th World Festival of Youth and Students in Pyongyang, but they are unable to find evidence of the existence of Esperanto speakers in North Korea.

== Current status ==
South Korea still hosts many educational institutions that have an Esperanto club.
