= China Esperanto League =

Official Esperanto association of China

- 中华全国世界语协会
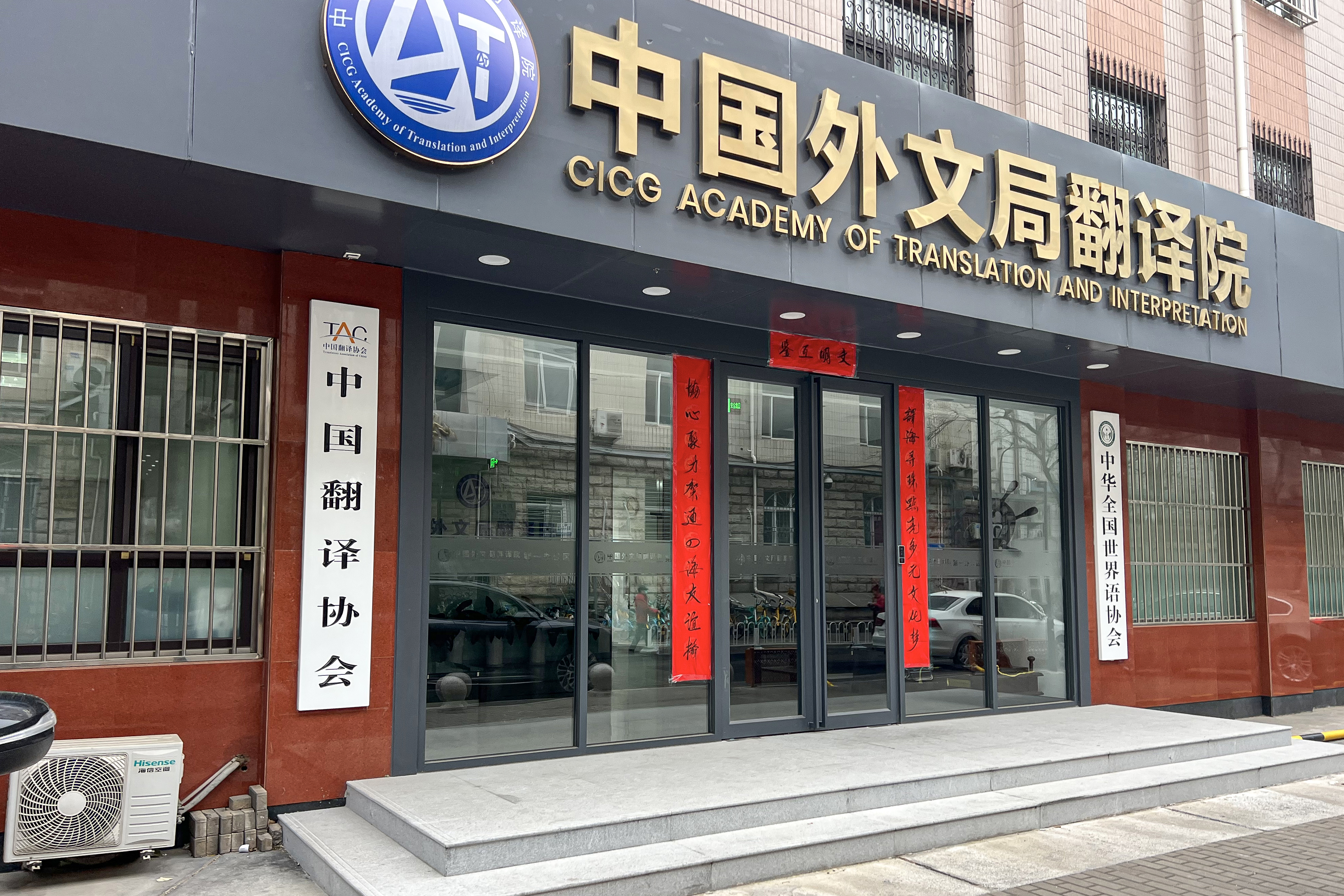
- Headquarters of the ĈEL at the China International Communications Group
- Formation: March 11, 1951; 75 years ago
- Type: People's organization

The China Esperanto League (Chinese: 中华全国世界语协会; pinyin: Zhōnghuá quánguó shìjièyǔ xiéhuì; Esperanto: Ĉina Esperanto-Ligo) is the official Esperanto association of China. The league was founded on March 11, 1951, and was admitted as the 43rd member in August 1980 by the Universal Esperanto Association (UEA).

== History ==
The China Esperanto League was founded on March 11, 1951, in Beijing. 1956 was the first year that the league sent a representative to the World Esperanto Congress.

In 1957, the league began to publish the reissued El Popola Ĉinio (From People's China). The role of El Popola Ĉinio and other publications in Esperanto increased following the Sino-Soviet Split, with the rationale that editions in Esperanto could more easily enter the countries deemed revisionist than editions in Russian, French, or English.

During the Cultural Revolution, the league's activities were restricted, and interaction between the league and the UEA was reduced almost exclusively to the exchange of publications. In April 1976, Evert Jan Woessink was invited to China by the league. Although Woessink had exchanges with league personnel, at the end of these exchanges he still did not know if or when the league would join the UEA. After Woessink's return, Humphrey Tonkin, the president of the UEA, invited the league to the 62nd Congress in Reykjavík in 1977. In July 1979, the league made an attempt to join the UEA, and in August 1980, it was admitted as the 43rd member of the UEA. At that time, the league had 1,124 members and was therefore granted two committee seats. In 1981, the league launched Shijie (The World) magazine. Around 1981, as a result of the promotion of Esperanto by Chu Tunan, Hu Yuzhi, Ba Jin, Xie Bingxin, Bai Shouyi, Ye Shengtao and Xia Yan, Esperanto associations were set up one after another in all provinces, cities and autonomous regions except Guizhou and Tibet.

The China Esperanto League hosted two World Esperanto Congresses in Beijing in 1986 and 2004.

== Organization ==
Headquartered in Beijing, the league is dedicated to coordinating and serving Esperanto speakers throughout China. The league has established an Esperanto Museum with the Zaozhuang University. At present, the league organizes a national Esperanto congress every two years.
