= Hyundai Group (disambiguation) =

Hyundai Group (IPA: [ˈhjəːndɛ]) was a South Korean chaebol, controlled by Chung Ju-yung until his death in 2001, which has been broken up into numerous independent companies. The term may also refer to many of these successor companies, including:

- Hyundai Asan, a division of the remnant Hyundai Group
- Hyundai Department Store Group
- Hyundai Engineering (HEC)
- Hyundai Electronics, renamed as Hynix in 2001
- Hyundai Heavy Industries Group
  - Hyundai Heavy Industries, a division of Hyundai Heavy Industries Group
- Hyundai Marine & Fire Insurance
- Hyundai Merchant Marine
- Hyundai Motor Group
  - Hyundai Engineering and Construction, a subsidiary of Hyundai Motor Group
  - Hyundai Motor Company, a division of Hyundai Motor Group
