= Esperanto in China =

International auxiliary language in China

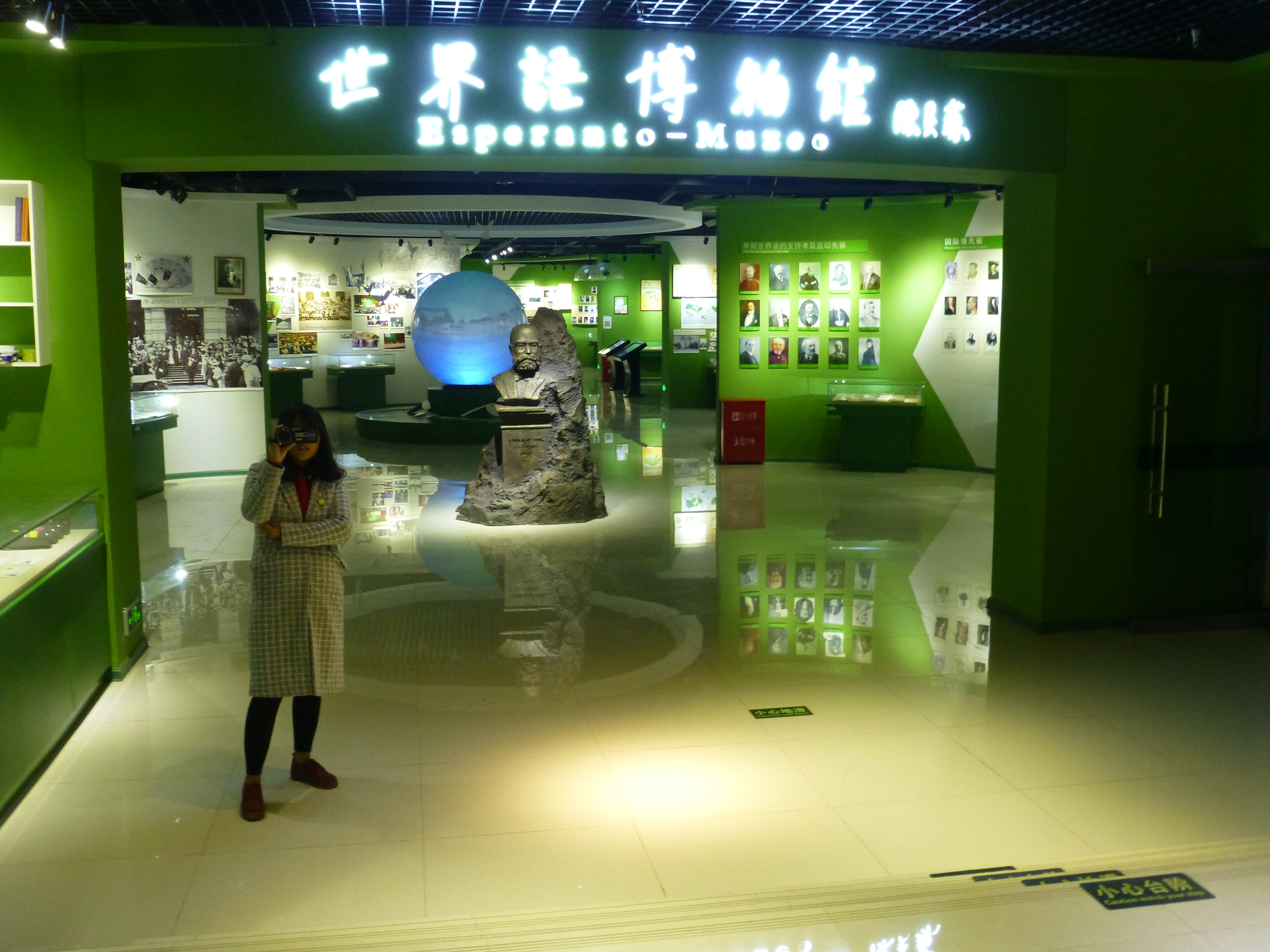
Esperanto Museum in Zaozhuang University

Esperanto in China dates back to the late Qing dynasty, and remains active in China. During the early People's Republic of China, policymakers viewed Esperanto as a means to engage readers and intellectuals in the non-socialist countries and, after the Sino-Soviet split, in countries aligned with the USSR.

== History ==
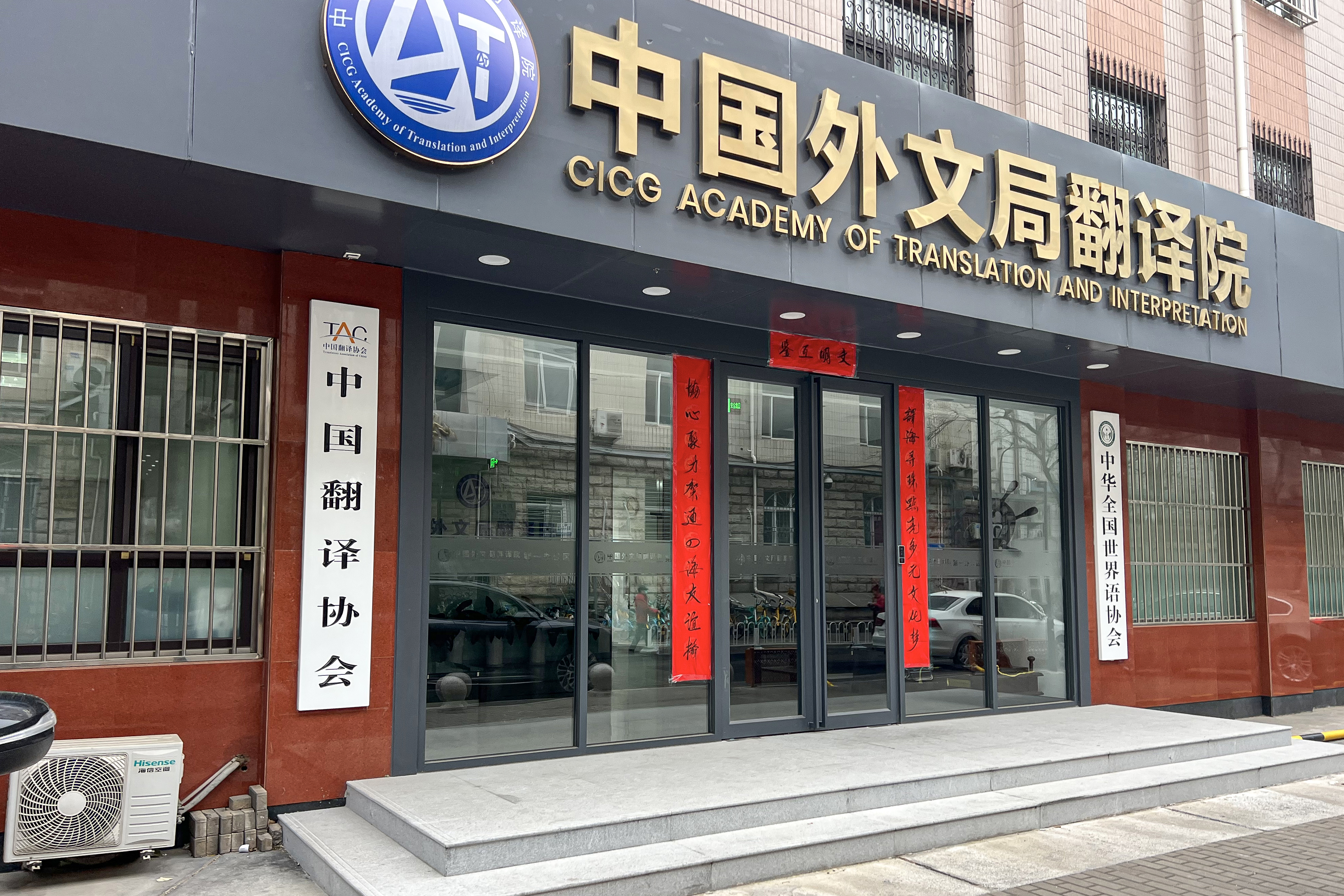
China Esperanto League in Beijing

Esperanto was imported to the Qing dynasty along with other western inventions, and mainly from Russian merchants in Harbin. It was brought from Chinese students who studied overseas, in Japan, France, and Britain. The first attested Esperanto courses in China were held in Shanghai in 1906. Shanghai later became the birthplace of the Chinese Esperanto Association in 1909. The association was active during the Xinhai revolution, with the education minister of the Republic of China, Cai Yuanpei, ordering Esperanto to be taught in Chinese schools as an elective course. Cai later invited Vasili Eroshenko to be an esperanto instructor at Beijing University. In 1923 the Beijing Esperanto College was founded. Esperanto also played a pivotal role in national liberation movements in China during the Sino-Japanese war of 1937, with the slogan per Esperanto por la liberigo de Ĉinio (transl. for the liberation of China through Esperanto). The Esperanto movement was also popular among Chinese anarchists such as Ba Jin, Li Shizeng, and Liu Shifu. After the PRC takeover, the China Esperanto League was founded in 1951, but the support of the communist government initially waned. The first ever national Esperanto meeting was held in 1963. This led to a lot of Esperanto courses being opened in 1964. The movement faced another challenge during the cultural revolution due to the arrest of esperantists.

People's Republic of China publishes its official magazine El Popola Ĉinio, which began its publication in 1950. The role of El Popola Ĉinio and other publications in Esperanto increased following the Sino-Soviet Split, with the rationale that editions in Esperanto could more easily enter the countries deemed revisionist than editions in Russian, French, or English.

In 1962, Chinese policy discussions emphasized Esperanto as a way to reach non-socialist foreign intellectuals.

The peak amount of Esperanto learning in China occurred in the 1980s, but its prominence decreased as emphasis on teaching English in China increased.

In 2018, Zaozhuang University began allowing students to major in Esperanto. In 2023, in all of China, only Zaozhuang University still had a department dedicated to teaching Esperanto. In January 2023, that department had 24 students. That enrollment decreased after a social media influencer mocked the program the following month.

== Current culture ==
In 2012, a museum to Esperanto (Esperanto Museum) was established at Zaozhuang University.

== See also ==
- Taiwan Esperanto Association
