= Hyundai Marine & Fire Insurance =

South Korean insurance company

Hyundai Marine & Fire Insurance Co., Ltd.

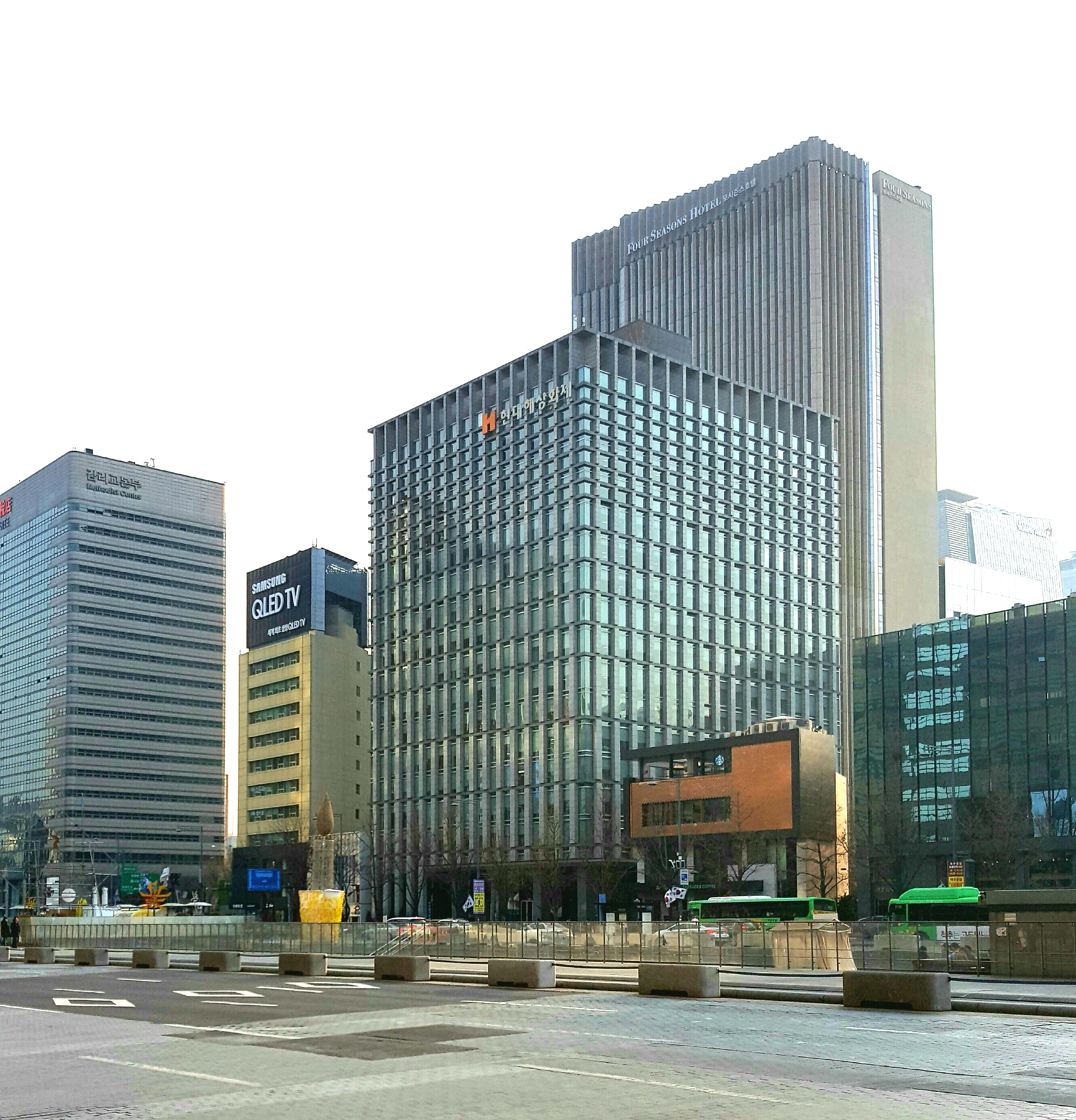
- Headquarters in Seoul
- Native name: 현대해상화재보험 주식회사
- Company type: Public
- Traded as: KRX: 001450
- Industry: Insurance
- Founded: 1955; 71 years ago
- Headquarters: Seoul, South Korea
- Website: www.hi.co.kr

Hyundai Marine & Fire Insurance Co., Ltd. (Korean: 현대해상화재보험 주식회사; Hanja: 現代海上火災保險 株式會社; RR: Hyeondae Haesang Hwajae Boheom Jusik Hoesa) is an insurance company headquartered in Seoul, South Korea. It is one of the largest non-life insurers in South Korea alongside Samsung Fire & Marine, DB Insurance, and KB Insurance.

== History ==
Hyundai Marine & Fire Insurance was established as Dongbang Marine Insurance in 1955. Hyundai Group acquired Dongbang in 1983 and changed its name to Hyundai Marine & Fire Insurance in 1985. However, due to Hyundai's break up caused by a feud between the group founder Chung Ju-yung's sons, Hyundai Insurance was split from the original Group in 1999. Chung Mong-yoon, the founder's seventh son, took control of the company.

== Operations ==
Hyundai Insurance is one of the four domestic insurers that dominates the South Korean non-insurance market. In the global market, Hyundai acquired a 25% interest in Vietinbank Insurance in 2018. The company also formed a joint venture with DiDi Chuxing and Legend Holdings for China market in 2020.

== See also ==
- List of largest insurance companies
- Han Moo-hyup
