= François Grin =

Swiss economist

François Grin (born 14 September 1959) is a Swiss economist. One of his research fields is the economics of language.

Grin studied economics at the University of Geneva, where he obtained a doctorate summa cum laude in 1989. He then was a teacher at the universities of Montreal and Washington (in Seattle), assistant professor at the University of Geneva and vice-director of the European Centre for Minority Issues in Flensburg, Germany. Since 2001 he is a visiting professor at the University of Lugano, in 2003 he became professor at the University of Geneva.

In his research, he studies the linguistic situation in Switzerland and in the European Union and its economic consequences. He is the author of a 2005 report entitled L'enseignement des langues étrangères comme politique publique (The teaching of foreign languages as a public policy), best known as Grin's Report. In this document, Grin indicates that the choice of Esperanto as a bridge language for Europe would lead to an annual saving of 25 billion euros. He also suggested a language tax to compensate for the drawbacks of countries whose language is not widespread.

Grin has also studied the case of Kalmyk, an Oirat language in Russia.

== Grin's Report ==
In 2005 François Grin wrote Foreign language teaching as public policy, answering a request by the Haut conseil de l'éducation. This document attempts to answer the following questions: "What foreign languages ought to be taught, for what reasons, and considering what context?" It considers the economic costs of language policies, as well as their cultural and policy implications. It examines three scenarios: the choice of a single natural language, the choice of three natural languages and the choice of a constructed language, Esperanto.

This report has not resulted in real changes in the language policy of any State.

The report suggests that use of English gives unfair redistribution to Anglophones. A set of three, e.g. French, German and English, would reduce inequalities among speakers, but still impose a burden on those whose first language is not among those chosen. A further problem is the choice of languages for the trio (and the criteria for choosing them).

The report argues that adoption of Esperanto would save the EU 25 billion euros a year. Grin suggests that adoption of Esperanto as a working language is unlikely given prejudices against the language, but that such a move may be achieved in the long term.

Economists Adriana Vintean and Ovidiu Matiu suggested in 2008 that adoption of Esperanto would likely lead to large savings for Europe, but that teaching Esperanto would be a major expense for poorer EU nations such as Romania or Bulgaria.

== See also ==
- Economics of language
