= Amikumu =

Mobile application for finding people nearby that speak a given language

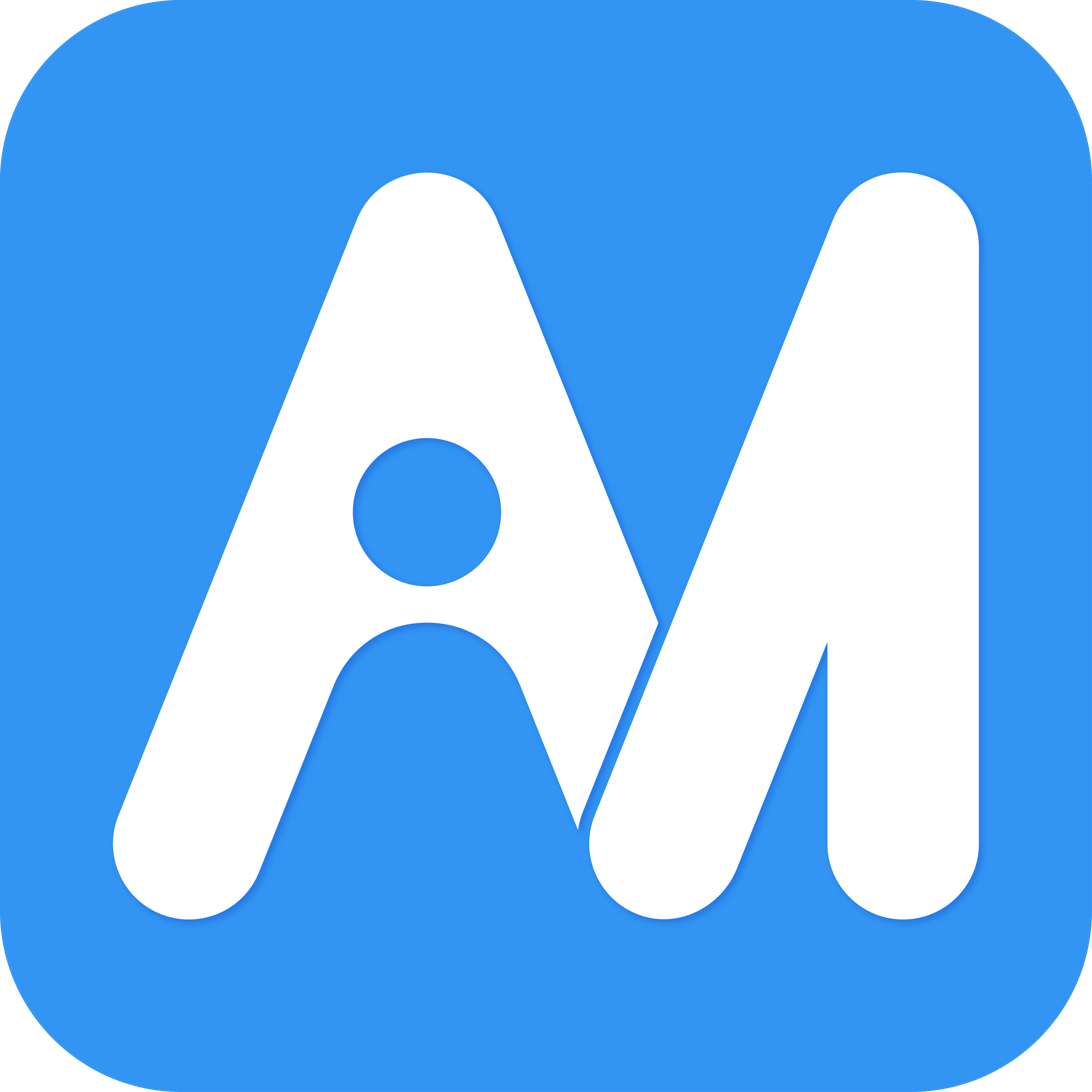

- Example of the main interface
- Developer(s): Chuck Smith, Richard Delamore
- Initial release: 22 April 2017; 8 years ago

Stable release(s) [±]
- Android: 3.3 / December 28, 2019; 5 years ago
- iOS: 3.5 / September 28, 2018; 6 years ago
- Platform: Android, iOS
- License: Proprietary
- Website: amikumu.com

Amikumu (/ɑːmiˈkuːmuː/ ah-mee-KOO-moo; Esperanto pronunciation: [a.mi.ˈku.mu]) is a cross-platform app for smartphones (Android and iOS) which can be used to find people nearby who speak or learn the same languages as the user. The app was launched for Esperanto speakers on 22 April 2017 and for speakers of all languages during LangFest in Montreal on 25 August 2017. On 9 August 2018 Amikumu had members in more than 130 countries speaking 588 languages.

== Architecture ==
The Android app is written in Java and Kotlin, the iOS app in Swift, and the server in Ruby on Rails.

== Kickstarter campaign ==
Amikumu was funded in part using Kickstarter. The Kickstarter campaign, organized by Esperanto speakers Chuck Smith and Richard "Evildea" Delamore, launched on 18 October 2016. More than 3000 euros were collected in the first 10 hours after the campaign started. The original goal of the campaign was 8500 euros, which was reached in 27 hours. The campaign went on until 16 November 2016, collecting a total of 26,671 euros, which is over three times more than the original goal.
