= Universal (Esperantido) =

Constructed language based on Esperanto

- Pronunciation: [univerˈsal]
- Created by: G. I. Muravskin & L. I. Vasilevskij
- Date: 1923
- Users: None
- Purpose: Esperantido: Universal
- Writing system: Latin

Language codes
- ISO 639-3: None (mis)
- Glottolog: None

Universal is an Esperantido, a constructed language based on Esperanto. It has inclusive and exclusive pronouns, uses partial reduplication for the plural (tablo "table", tatablo "tables"), and inversion for antonyms (mega "big", gema "little"; donu "give", nodu "receive"; tela "far", leta "near"). Inversion can be seen in,

Al gefinu o fargu kaj la egnifu o grafu.

He finished reading [lit. 'to read'] and she started to write.

Antonyms include the pronouns al "he" and la "she", the ge- (completive) and eg- (inchoative) aspects, the verbs fin- "to finish" and nif- "to begin", and the verbs graf- "to write" and farg- "to read".

The Universal reduplicated plural and inverted antonyms are reminiscent of the musical language Solresol.

== Orthography ==
The Latin alphabet is used with IPA values, with five additional IPA letters: ø, ə, ʃ, ʒ, ŋ. The affricates are written ts, dz, tʃ, dʒ. The schwa ⟨ə⟩ is used to break up consonant clusters in compound words and the like.

A palatalized consonant is marked with a hacek, a nasalized vowel with a tilde: ã (among other things, nasalization marks the accusative case; a long vowel by a circumflex: â

If stress is not marked, it falls on the last non-schwa vowel preceding the last consonant of the word. Otherwise it is marked by an acute accent: á.

== Grammar ==
=== Inflectional morphology ===
As in Esperanto, Universal nouns are marked by the suffix -o, which is elidable in certain cases. O by itself is a subordinating conjunction:

al gefinu o fargu kaj egnifu o grafu
"he has finished reading and is beginning to write."

As in Japanese, adjectives and verbs are a single part of speech in Universal. They have two forms, an attributive form when they modify a noun like an adjective, and a predicative form when they stand on their own to form a clause like a verb.

The predicative form is marked by the suffix -u: urbo megu "(the) city is big", lampo pendu "(the) lamp is hanging". On its own before a noun, this u is a copula: formiko u insekto "(the) ant is an insect". Tenses are optional. (See below.)

As in Esperanto, the attributive form is marked by the suffix -a: mega urbo "big city", penda lampo "hanging lamp". This a on its own is a preposition: podo a tablo "leg of a table", luso a deno "light of day, daylight". Nouns may instead be converted directly into attributives with the suffix -j-: denja luso "daylight".

Personal pronominal roots end in i, as in Esperanto, but inflect for number and gender as do nouns. (See below.) Possessives take the -j- that converts nominals to verbals as well as the attributive -a: mi "I", mija "my, mine"; vi "you", vija "your, yours"; al "he", alja "his"; la "she", laja "her, hers"; lo "it", loja "its", etc.

==== Optional inflection ====
Plurality and pluractionality may be shown through reduplication, usually partial: tatablo (or tablo-tablo) "tables", dendeno or dedeno "days", kloklora "of many colours", marmarʃu "walk repeatedly".

Tense is also optional, and may be used with verbs or nouns. The affix e indicates past tense when prefixed (ebela "formerly beautiful", eʃefo "ex-boss"), but future tense when suffixed and stressed (sanéa "healthy-to-be", urbéo "city-to-be"). The imperative is marked by the prefix ʒ-, which often requires a schwa to break up consonant clusters: ʒədonu "give!", ʒəluso "let there be light".

Oblique case (direct and indirect objects) may be marked by nasalisation of the final vowel of the noun and also of any attributives: ʒədonu zeã librõ "give this book!". This includes the conjunction o: ʒənifu õ grafu "start writing!".

Gender is optionally indicated by the prefixes al- for masculine (altigro "he-tiger", al-Dʒonson "Mr Johnson"), and la- for feminine (latigro "she-tiger", la-Dʒonson "Ms Johnson"). In a few words gender is marked by a, infixed before the last consonant for the masculine (tigar or tigaro "male tiger"), suffixed and stressed for the feminine (tigrá or tigráo "tigress"). Even verbs can be marked for gender, with the meaning of performing the action in a masculine or feminine way.

Personal pronouns take gender in a, and may drop their characteristic i ending when they do, just as nouns may drop their o:

mi "I", masculine ami or am, feminine mai or ma;
ti "thou", masc. ati or at, fem. tai or ta,

and similarly with formal vi, av(i), va(i);

li "s/he", ali or al "he" and the masculine prefix, lai or la "she" and the feminine prefix, etc.

The latter forms use reduplication for plurality: alali "they" (masc.), lalai "they" (fem.).

=== Derivational morphology ===
Some of the structure of Universal words is apparent at a glance, but cannot be easily extended to create new vocabulary.

As in the Semitic languages, vocalic ablaut derives roots with related meanings, such as lina "long", lana "wide", and lona "tall", or valdo "forest", veldo "savannah", and vildo "steppe".

Inversion is used to create antonyms, and is so characteristic of Universal that one of its creators jested that the language should be called "Inversal".

Some inverted antonyms
mega	"big, great"	gema	"small"
donu	"give"	nodu	"receive"
za	"the"	az	"a, an"
tela	"far, distant"	leta	"near, close"
ponu	"put"	nopu	"take"
jen	"yes"	nej	"no"
bona	"good"	noba	"bad"
lisu	"speak"	silu	"be silent"
se	"if"	es	"unconditionally"
bela	"beautiful"	leba	"ugly"
ploru	"cry, weep"	lorpu	"laugh"
kon	"with"	nok	"without"
masa	"mass, amassed"	sama	"lone, single"
grafu	"write"	fargu	"read"
do	"to, towards, till"	od	"from"
meza	"middle"	zema	"marginal"
merku	"sell"	kremu	"buy"
kaj	"likewise, and"	jak	"contrariwise, but"
nera	"black"	rena	"white"
produ	"produce"	dorpu	"consume"
al	(masculine)	la	(feminine)
stroju	"build"	jortsu	"destroy"
un	"one", singular	nu	"several", plural
zea	"this"	eza	"that"
deno	"day"	nedo	"night"
fino	"end"	nifo	"beginning"
zena	"the same"	neza	"other, another"
kozo	"reason, cause"	zoko	"consequence"
medo	"means"	demo	"goal"

As in Esperanto, extensive compounding keeps the number of roots low; cf. simpatu "sympathise" and its partial inversion mispatu "be hostile". However, a number of frequent compounds are contracted into new roots: dennedo → dendo "day and night", evdeno → evdo "morning", evnedo → evno "evening", evzaro → evzo "spring", evrazo → evro "autumn".

The personal pronouns have somewhat irregular morphology. The bare roots are all singular:

mi "I", ti "thou" (informal "you"), vi "you" (formal or honorific), li "he/she", and—through ablaut—lo "it" (inanimate).

The plurals are based on Esperanto ili "they":

imi "we", iti "ye" (informal), ivi "you" (formal), ili "they".

Compounds are used to specify clusivity:

mimi "we" (exclusive), timi "we" (inclusive informal: thou/ye & I), vimi "we" (inclusive formal: you & I).

(The base (singular) form of the second-person pronoun appears to be used in the compounds timi and vimi regardless of number. That is, no dual–plural distinction is attested.)

== Bibliography ==
- L I Vasilevskij (1925), Neizvestnaja stranica v istorii otechestvennoj interlingvistiki—jazyk Universal, in M I Isaev et al. (eds.), Problemy interlingvistiki: Tipologija i êvoljucija mezhdunarodnyx iskusstvennyx jazykov. Moscow: Nauka, 1976.
