= Seok Joo-myung =

Korean entomologist (1908–1950)

Seok Joo-myung (Korean: 석주명; Hanja: 石宙明; November 13, 1908 – October 6, 1950) was a Korean lepidopterist who made significant contributions to the taxonomy of the butterfly species of Korea. He was also a noted linguist and pacifist.

He was born in Pyongyang, Korean Empire, on November 13, 1908. His life had been tough during Japanese colonial era from 1910 to 1945 and a sudden attack took away his life on October 6, 1950. He graduated from Kaesong Songdo Higher Normal School in 1926 and then graduated from Kagoshima Higher Agriculture and Forestry School in Japan in 1929. In 1930, he a biology teacher at Songdo Middle School and worked there for 10 years. From that time, he dedicated his life to butterflies and Jeju research. Korean people call him Korean Fabre, lightening his brilliant achievements in the dark period.

== Main scientific work ==
Japanese scientists said that there were 921 species of Korean butterflies but he made a great effort to collect 160 mil of cabbage butterflies throughout the Korean peninsular and compared their patterns and measured the length of front wings with a ruler by himself. He drew a conclusion that even though the wing patterns are different, they might not be different species and got rid of many wrong scientific names posted by Japanese prematurely and proved that they are individually changed adapting to surroundings and classified Chosun butterflies into 248 species. He longed for Chosun independence so he set the first stone for the classification of Chosun butterflies through his enormous samples he labeled butterflies Korean name and add seok. Especially he named an undiscovered butterfly the Fluttering Butterfly of the Jirisan Mountain for the first time in the world. By measuring the wing length and comparing the patterns of over 160,000 cabbage butterflies collected throughout Korea, Seok concluded that about 20 previously classified species were actually all the cabbage white butterfly.

In 1940 A Synonymic list of butterflies of Korea was published by The Korea Branch of the Royal Asiatic Society. It was the first time for a Korean to be sponsored by the British Royal academy. After that, he was selected as a regular member of world entomology. Throughout his entire life, he had collected 750,000 butterflies samples and sorted and marked the locations on the Korean maps and world maps each way. When the Korean War broke out, he tried hard to keep his samples and maps so he couldn't escape Seoul. Unfortunately, his collections were totally burnt. With his sister's brave efforts of carrying the maps on her back, the distribution maps of Korean butterflies by Sok, Chumyong, in 1973 was safely released in the world after his death. The book is made of 500 maps with red mark with accuracy. Due to his research of Korean butterflies, modern entomology on butterfly has been being studied by a great number of scholars in the field.

== Later activities and death ==
He wrote a small dictionary Lernolibro de Esperato Kun Vortaeto 1947 because he was deeply involved in international peace movement to resist Japanese imperialism. He didn't change his Korean name into Japanese name until liberation. He voluntarily transferred to the Jeju natural medicine laboratory in Seogwipo, Jeju Island in 1943. While he had been working here for two years, he was fascinated by particularity of Jeju culture and absorbed in Jeju exploration. Six general books: Jeju dialect, Jeju population, Jeju document, Jeju essay, history of Jeju insect, and Jeju data, were published. These are valuable resources for Jeju study.

After liberation, he was in charge of zoology of the national museum. During the Korean War, he was mistaken as one of North Korea's People's Army and got shot by a drunken man, in front of a theater in Seoul while he was going to the national museum which was burnt by a bombing attack. It was said that just right before his death, he shouted 'I do not know anything but butterflies.' During the Korean War he remained at the Seoul National Science Museum to protect his butterfly collection rather than evacuating.
