= Economics of language =

The economics of language is an emerging field of study concerning a range of topics such as the effect of language skills on income and trade, the costs and benefits of language planning options, the preservation of minority languages, etc. It is relevant to analysis of language policy.

In his book 'Language and Economy', the German sociolinguist Florian Coulmas discusses "the many ways in which language and economy interact, how economic developments influence the emergence, expansion, or decline of languages; how linguistic conditions facilitate or obstruct the economic process; how multilingualism and social affluence are interrelated; how and why language and money fulfill similar functions in modern societies; why the availability of a standard language is an economic advantage; how the unequal distribution of languages in multilingual societies makes for economic inequality; how the economic value of languages can be assessed; why languages have an internal economy and how they adapt to the demands of the external economy. Florian Coulmas asserts that language is the medium of business, an asset in itself and sometimes a barrier to trade".

States shoulder language costs, because it maintains themselves by means of it, as does business which needs communication competence. Florian Coulmas discusses the language-related expenditures of government and business in Language and economy. In the same book he also discusses the role of language as a commodity, because languages can behave like economic systems. That is why socio-economic ecologies are (dis)favorable to particular languages. The spread of languages depends in an essential way on economic conditions. Language can be an expression of symbolic power. However, changes in the linguistic map of the world show that these are also powerfully linked to economic developments in the world. Assigning an economic value to a certain language in the linguistic market place means vesting it with some of the privileges and power related to that language. Most language communities in the world practice this policy without any concern about reciprocity in language learning investments, forgetting the pursuit of linguistic justice as parity of esteem and while linguistic regimes are sometimes very unjust. States must also face decisions regarding the extent of trade-offs between economic inefficiency and linguistic disenfranchisement.

== Origins ==
The origins of the economics of language can be traced to Jacob Marschak's 1965 publication Economics of language. Here, he discusses the "efficiency of communication."

== Language skills as human capital ==
Possession of language skills is often valued in the labor market, since it allows for greater efficiency in trade and communication.

== Global language and global economy ==
Languages are capital investments in a literal sense: language technology is the most important one. It requires substantial investments which, in the absence of profitability, only affluent countries and businesses can afford. In this respect, today English is seen as a consequence and an instrument of American imperial power, an appreciable asset for American anglophones in the twenty-first-century global contest for competitive advantage, prosperity, and power. Though the best business language remains the language of the customers, meaning multilingual business practices, an "ideal' global economy presupposes a single language for the whole world. But an "ideal" global language presupposes a common acceptable and fair language burden for all business partners. Governments of countries whose language occupies a leading position on the international language market tend to refuse to subsidize the spread of other languages for which they believe they have no need.

In his report L'enseignement des langues étrangères comme politique publique, François Grin argues that 'though some languages would be more beneficial in terms of cost-benefit analysis' such as e.g. Esperanto (Esperanto business groups such as IKEF have been active for many years), the problem is that a shifting pattern in the valuation of languages is not always brought about by rationally calculable factors only. In addition to its economic potential, language is also a carrier of political, cultural and sociopsychological properties. In spite of the non-economic values attached to language, what prevails in matters of language is often that which is profitable and this can lead to the superiority of a dominant language as a means of production, with a high linguistic capital value. In this respect it is evident that the will (or necessity) to learn English in the last decades has grown so much and its range of action has been so wide that the economic necessity and other incentives of foreign-language study are generally perceived as unimportant.

For similar reasons, former British prime minister Margaret Thatcher tried to torpedo the LINGUA program of the European Community, as from her point of view, Britain was asked to pay for a program which benefited her country least. Because of the enormous imbalance on current accounts of the major European languages in favor of English, the LINGUA program called for an expansion and diversification of foreign-language education in the Member States. For the individual speaker the unequal linguistic balances imply that the first language is an economically exploitable qualification for some who can simply marketing their mother tongue skills, whereas others can not.

== Gender gap ==
In their study Gendered language and the educational gender gap, Davis and Reynolds found a connection between the use of gendered languages and the disparity between men and women. They compared languages with one noun class (e.g. English), two noun classes (e.g. Spanish), for masculine and feminine, and three noun classes (e.g. German), for masculine, feminine, and neuter. They concluded that countries that primarily speak languages with two sex-based noun classes are also countries with "lower rates of female participation in labor and credit markets." In addition, such countries often establish political gender quotas.

Gendered languages were also found by Van der Velde, Tyrowicz, and Siwinska in Language and (the estimates of) the gender wage gap to relate to the gender wage gap. They pointed out that the presence of gender neutral environments can lead to at least three consequences: less discrimination by employers against women, less pressure placed upon workers to meet certain gender roles and expectations, and the decreasing wage gap.

== Pronouns ==
Studies have shown that there exists more emphasis on collectivism within societies in which it is not uncommon in the predominant language to drop pronouns. For example, Spanish speakers can say, "Yo estoy cantando," but they are also given the option to say, "Estoy cantando." Other pronoun-drop languages include Mandarin, Arabic, Hindi, Portuguese, Russian, Japanese, and Korean. On the contrary, speakers of languages that do not typically drop pronouns, such as English, German, and French, tend to express more individualistic views.

Languages with multiple forms of you for the purposes of indicating respect have proven to produce speakers who are more conscious of class differences.

== Selected readings ==
- Gabrielle Hogan-Brun, Linguanomics, Bloomsbury Academic, 2017, ISBN 9781474238311
- Gazzola, Michele & Wickström, Bengt-Arne (2016): The Economics of Language Policy. Cambridge: MIT Press.
- (it) Gazzola, Michele 2016. Il valore economico delle lingue - Lingua, Politica, Cultura. Serta Gratulatoria in Honorem Renato Corsetti. New York, Mundial
- Robichaud, David (2016). "A market failure approach to linguistic justice". Journal of Multilingual and Multicultural Development. 38 (7): 1–10. doi:10.1080/01434632.2016.1192173. S2CID 148176218.
- "Scientific research on languages and the economy: An overview", Round table on "Languages and the economy", Network for the Promotion of Linguistic Diversity (NPLD), Welsh Government European Office, Brussels, Belgium, 21 January 2015 [Invited speaker : Michele Gazzola].
- (eo) Gazzola, Michele, 2015 Ekonomiko, Lingva Justeco kaj Lingva Politiko” Informilo por interlingvistoj, 92-93, (1-2/2015)
- Gazzola, Michele 2014. The Evaluation of Language Regimes. Amsterdam/Philadelphia, John Benjamins
- The economics of language policy, Center for economic studies (CES), 2013
- (it) "Il valore economico delle lingue" (the economic value of languages), Annual conference of the European Observatory for Plurilingualism, Rome, 10 October 2012 [Invited speaker : Michele Gazolla].
- Tarun Jain, Common tongue: The impact of language on economic performance, Indian School of Business, August 14, 2012.
- Chiswick, Barry R., and Paul W. Miller. 2007. The Economics of Language: International Analyses. Routledge.
- Grin, François, 1996, Economic approaches to language and language planning: an introduction
- Grin, François, 2003. "Language Planning and Economics." Current Issues in Language Planning 4 (1):1-66"
- Lamberton, Donald M., ed. 2002. The Economics of Language. Cheltenham, UK: E. Elgar Pub.
- Breton, Albert, ed. 2000. Exploring the Economics of Language. Ottawa : Official Languages Support Program, Canadian Heritage.
- Coulmas, Florian, Language and economy, ed. 1992, Blackwell Publishers
- (de) Coulmas, Florian, Die Wirtschaft mit der Sprache, ed. 1992, Frankfurt am Main, Suhrkamp
- Dr. Gergely Kovács, Economic Aspects of Language Inequality in the European Union, 2007, Tatabánya, College for modern business studies.
- (fr - video) LANGUES ET ARGENT : ce qu'on ne vous dit pas
- Kadochnikov, Denis (2016). Languages, Regional Conflicts and Economic Development: Russia. In: Ginsburgh, V., Weber, S. (Eds.). The Palgrave Handbook of Economics and Language. London: Palgrave Macmillan. pp. 538–580. ISBN 978-1-137-32505-1
- Lazear, Edward (1999). "Culture and Language," Journal of Political Economy, 107(S6), pp. 95–126. Abstract.
- McCloskey, D.N. (1983). "The Rhetoric of Economics," Journal of Economic Literature, 21(2), pp. 481-517.
- McCloskey, D.N. (1998). 2nd ed. The Rhetoric of Economics. Description & scrollable preview. University of Wisconsin Press.

== See also ==
- Grin, François
- (german) Florian Coulmas
- Van Parijs, Philippe
- Linguistic discrimination
- Linguicism
