= Zaozhuang University =

Post-secondary institution in Zaozhuang, Shandong, China

Coordinates: 34.901°N 117.532°E

- Simplified Chinese: 枣庄学院
- Traditional Chinese: 棗莊學院
- Literal meaning: Zaozhuang College/Educational institute
Transcriptions
Standard Mandarin
- Hanyu Pinyin: Zǎozhuāng Xuéyuàn

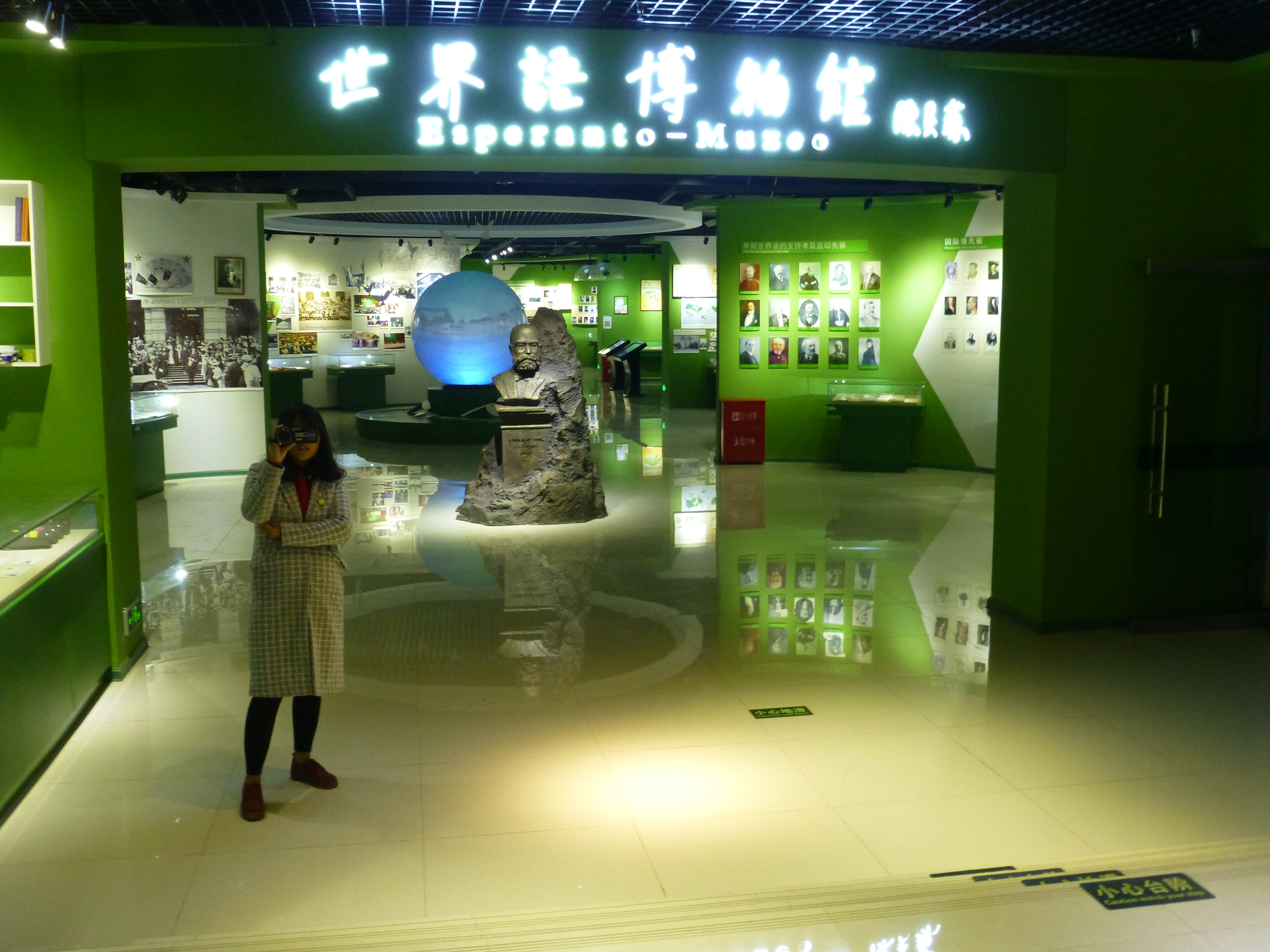
Esperanto Museum in Zaozhuang University

Zaozhuang University (Chinese: 枣庄学院; lit. 'Zaozhuang College/Educational institute') is a post-secondary educational institution in Zaozhuang, Shandong, China.

== History ==
Zaozhuang Teacher Training School opened in 1971. The government of Shandong Province converted it to a tertiary institute focused on the education field in 1984. It received its current name in 2004 along with a change into being a general post-secondary college.

== Esperanto studies ==
In 2018, Zaozhuang University began allowing students to major in Esperanto. In 2023, in China, only Zaozhuang University had a department dedicated to teaching Esperanto. In January 2023, that department had 24 students. That enrollment decreased after a social media influencer mocked the program the following month.

== Esperanto Museum ==
In 2012, a museum to Esperanto (Esperanto Museum) was established at Zaozhuang University.

== See also ==
- Esperanto in China
