= Esperanto =

Constructed auxiliary language

- Lingvo Internacia
- Esperanto
- Esperanto flag
- Pronunciation: [espeˈranto]
- Created by: L. L. Zamenhof
- Date: 1887
- Setting and usage: International: most parts of the world
- Users: Native: c. 1,000 (2022); L2: estimated 30,000 to 2 million: Sidney Culbert: Around 2 million; Amri Wandel: Above 2 million; Svend Vendelbo: 30,000–180,000
- Purpose: Constructed language: International auxiliary language; A posteriori language; Esperanto
- Early form: Proto-Esperanto
- Writing system: Latin script (Esperanto alphabet); Esperanto Braille
- Signed forms: Signuno
- Sources: Primarily Romance and Germanic languages, with some influence of Slavic and Greek

Official status
- Regulated by: Akademio de Esperanto

Language codes
- ISO 639-1: eo
- ISO 639-2: epo
- ISO 639-3: epo
- Glottolog: espe1235
- Linguasphere: 51-AAB-da
Esperantujo: Number of individual UEA members per million population in 2020.
none
< 0.5
0.5
1
2–3
4–5
6–9
10+

Esperanto (/ˌɛs.pəˈrɑːn.toʊ, -ˈræn.toʊ/; Esperanto: [espeˈranto]) is the world's most widely spoken constructed auxiliary language. Created by L. L. Zamenhof in 1887 as 'the International Language' (la Lingvo Internacia), it is intended to be a universal second language for international communication. Esperanto culture is grounded in the idea that people can interact on an equal footing across language barriers, without linguistic hierarchies, and with respect for linguistic and cultural diversity. Zamenhof described the language in Dr. Esperanto's International Language (known as Unua Libro, the 'first book'), which he published under the pseudonym Doktoro Esperanto. Early adopters of the language liked the name Esperanto ('one who hopes') so much, they soon used it to describe the language itself.

Within the range of constructed languages, Esperanto occupies a middle ground between "naturalistic" (imitating existing natural languages) and a priori (where features are not based on existing languages). Esperanto's vocabulary, syntax, and semantics derive predominantly from languages of the Indo-European group. A substantial majority of its vocabulary (approximately 80%) derives from Romance languages, but it also contains elements derived from Germanic, Greek, and Slavic languages. One of the language's most notable features is its extensive system of derivation, where prefixes and suffixes may be freely combined with roots to generate words, making it possible to communicate effectively with a smaller set of words.

Esperanto is the most successful constructed international auxiliary language and the only such language with a sizeable population of native speakers (denaskuloj), of which there are an estimated 2,000. Esperanto speakers are often called Esperantists (Esperantistoj). Usage estimates are difficult, but two estimates put the number of Esperantists at around 100,000. Concentration of speakers is highest in Europe, East Asia, and South America. Although no country has adopted Esperanto officially, Esperantujo ('Esperanto land') is used as a name for the collection of places where it is spoken. The language has gained a presence on the Internet and is accessible on platforms such as Wikipedia, Amikumu, Google Translate, and Duolingo.

Esperanto largely replaced Volapük in the 19th and 20th centuries as the most major international auxiliary language, as many previous Volapükists switched to Esperanto due to its much simpler language structure. A number of reforms to Esperanto, including an official 1894 proposal by Zamenhof, gender reforms, and "child" languages known as Esperantidos, have been proposed over the years.

== History ==
=== Background ===
Prior to the existence of Esperanto, Johann Martin Schleyer (1831 – 1912) already had the idea of creating an international auxiliary language to become the neutral universal second language of humanity, that could be learned by all through the creation of Volapük. His movement demonstrated there was real demand for a neutral common language in the 19th century, as it gained widespread and active usage. However, the internal collapse of the Volapük movement caused its gradual replacement by Esperanto, as many of its speakers joined the Esperanto movement which was linguistically simpler, and lacked central control; many former Volapük clubs became Esperanto clubs. The influence of Volapük was thus a major driver of the initial Esperanto movement, as it set the stage for the widespread usage of constructed languages, though its own usage declined radically.

=== Creation ===
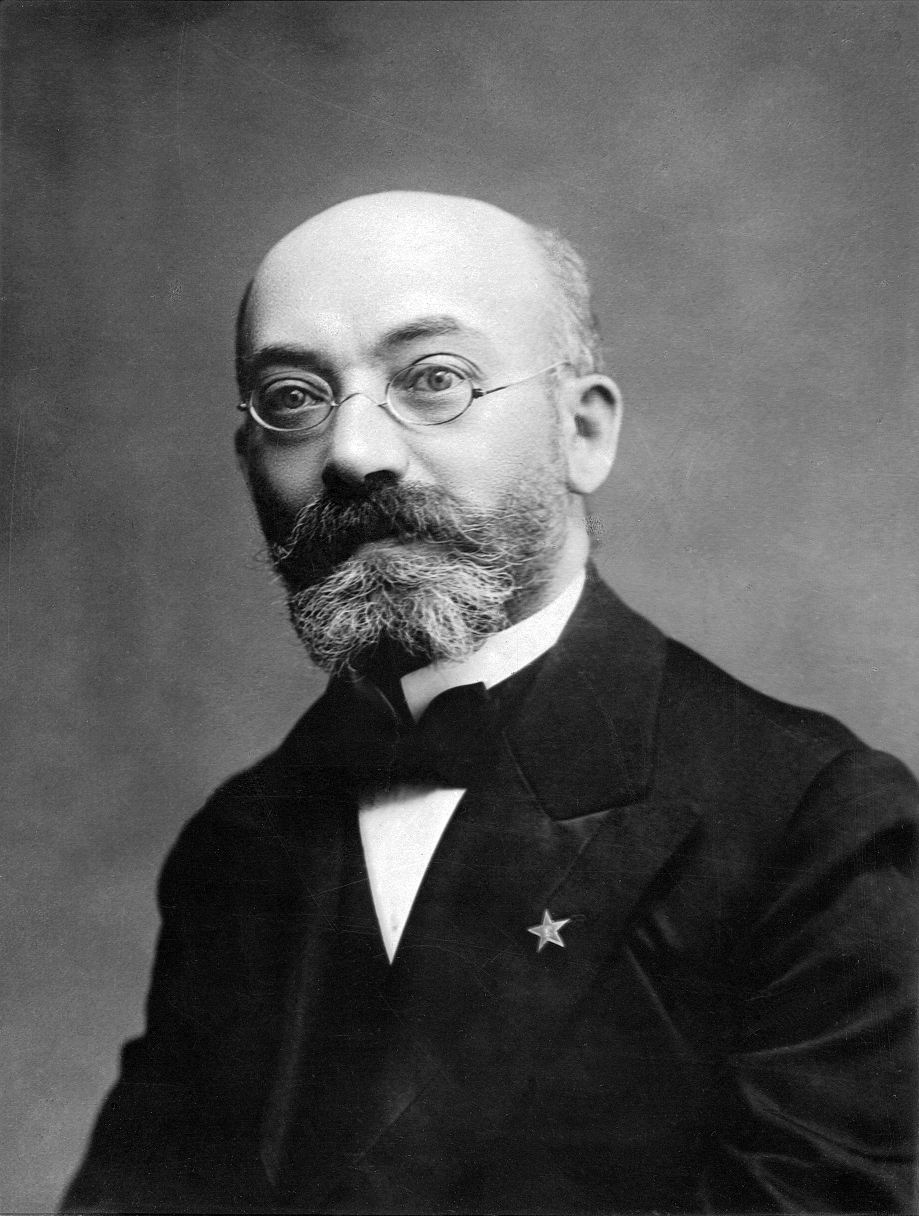
Zamenhof, c. 1895

The first Esperanto book by L. L. Zamenhof, now known as Unua Libro, published in 1887 in Russian. The title translates to: International Language: Preface and Complete Tutorial.

Esperanto was created in the late 1870s and early 1880s by L. L. Zamenhof, a Jewish ophthalmologist from Białystok, then part of the Russian Empire, but now part of Poland. After several iterations (Proto-Esperanto), he self-published the first book of Esperanto grammar (Unua Libro) on 26 July 1887. He did so under the pseudonym Doktoro Esperanto (lit. "one who hopes") and simply called the language "the international language" (la lingvo internacia). Early speakers grew fond of the name Esperanto and began to use it as the name for the language.

Zamenhof's goal was to create an easy and flexible language that would serve as a universal second language, to foster world peace and international understanding, and to build a "community of speakers". Zamenhof wrote that he wanted humankind to "learn and use ... en masse ... the proposed language as a living one". The goal for Esperanto to become an international auxiliary language was not Zamenhof's only goal; he also wanted to "enable the learner to make direct use of his knowledge with persons of any nationality, whether the language be universally accepted or not; in other words, the language is to be directly a means of international communication". His feelings and the situation in Białystok may be gleaned from an extract from his letter to Nikolai Borovko:

In Białystok the inhabitants were divided into four distinct elements: Russians, Poles, Germans, and Jews; each of these spoke their own language and looked on all the others as enemies. In such a town a sensitive nature feels more acutely than elsewhere the misery caused by language division and sees at every step that the diversity of languages is the first, or at least the most influential, basis for the separation of the human family into groups of enemies. I was brought up as an idealist; I was taught that all people were brothers, while outside in the street at every step I felt that there were no people, only Russians, Poles, Germans, Jews, and so on.

— L. L. Zamenhof, in a letter to Nikolai Borovko, c. 1895

Because people were reluctant to learn a new language which hardly anyone spoke, Zamenhof asked people to sign a promise to start learning Esperanto once ten million people made the same promise. He "was disappointed to receive only a thousand responses". Nevertheless, the number of speakers grew rapidly over the next few decades; at first, primarily in the Russian Empire and Central Europe, then in other parts of Europe, the Americas, China, and Japan.

In 1905, Zamenhof published the Fundamento de Esperanto as a definitive guide to the language. Later that year, French Esperantists organized with his participation the first World Esperanto Congress, an ongoing annual conference, in Boulogne-sur-Mer, France. Zamenhof also proposed to the first congress that an independent body of linguistic scholars should steward the future evolution of Esperanto, foreshadowing the founding of the Akademio de Esperanto (in part modeled after the Académie française), which was established soon thereafter.

=== 20th century ===
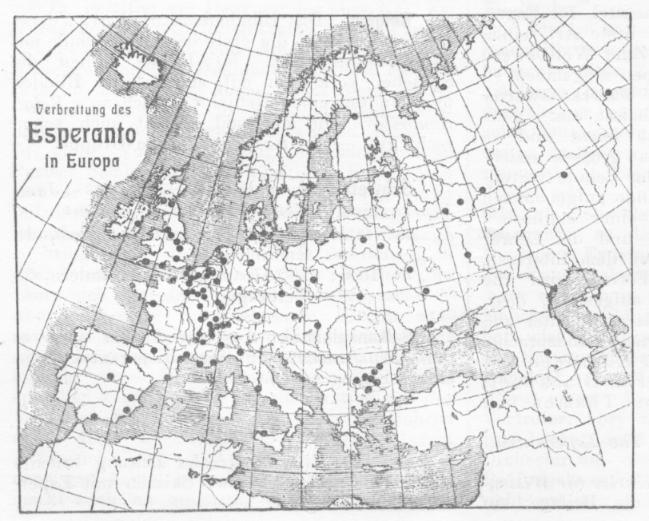
Map of Esperanto groups in Europe in 1905

After the First World War, a great opportunity for Esperanto seemingly presented itself, when the Iranian delegation to the League of Nations proposed that the language be adopted for use in international relations following a report by a Japanese delegate to the League named Nitobe Inazō, in the context of the 13th World Congress of Esperanto, held in Prague. Ten delegates accepted the proposal with only one voice against, the French delegate, Gabriel Hanotaux. Hanotaux opposed all recognition of Esperanto at the League, from the first resolution on 18 December 1920, and subsequently through all efforts during the next three years. However, two years later, the League recommended that its member states include Esperanto in their educational curricula. The French government retaliated by banning all instruction in Esperanto in France's schools and universities. The French Ministry of Public Instruction said that "French and English would perish and the literary standard of the world would be debased". Nonetheless, many people see the 1920s as the heyday of the Esperanto movement. During this time, anarchism as a political movement was very supportive of both anationalism and the Esperanto language.

Fran Novljan was one of the chief promoters of Esperanto in the former Kingdom of Yugoslavia. He was among the founders of the Croatian Prosvjetni savez (Educational Alliance), of which he was the first secretary, and organized Esperanto institutions in Zagreb. Novljan collaborated with Esperanto newspapers and magazines, and was the author of the Esperanto textbook Internacia lingvo esperanto i Esperanto en tridek lecionoj.

In 1920s Korea, socialist thinkers pushed for the use of Esperanto through a series of columns in The Dong-a Ilbo as resistance to both Japanese occupation as well as a counter to the growing nationalist movement for Korean language standardization. This lasted until the Mukden Incident in 1931, when changing colonial policy led to an outright ban on Esperanto education in Korea.

=== Persecution ===
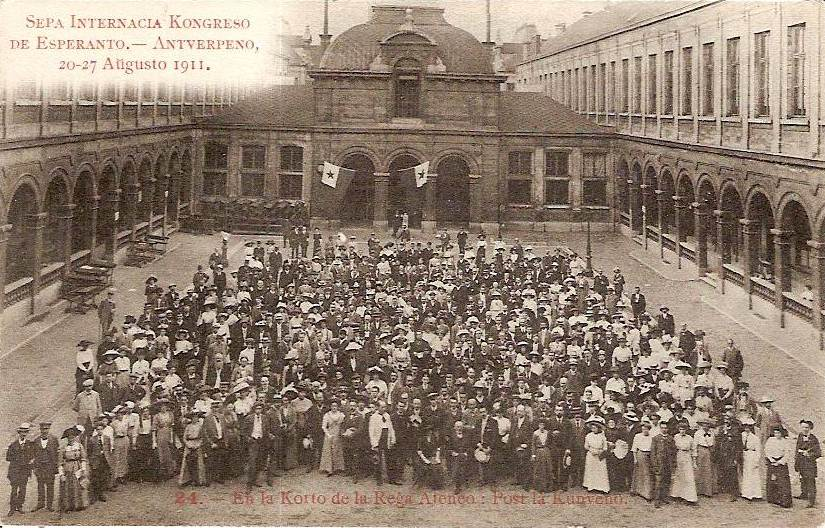
7th Esperanto congress, Antwerp, August 1911

Esperanto attracted the suspicion of many states. Repression was especially pronounced in Nazi Germany, Francoist Spain up until the 1950s, and the Soviet Union under Stalin, from 1937 to 1956.

In Nazi Germany, there was a motivation to ban Esperanto because Zamenhof was Jewish, and due to the internationalist nature of Esperanto, which was perceived as "Bolshevist". In his work Mein Kampf, Adolf Hitler specifically mentions Esperanto as an example of a language that could be used by an international Jewish conspiracy once they achieved world domination. Esperantists were killed during the Holocaust, with Zamenhof's family in particular singled out to be killed. The efforts of a minority of German Esperantists to expel their Jewish colleagues and overtly align themselves with the Reich were futile, and Esperanto was legally forbidden in 1935. Esperantists in German concentration camps did, however, teach Esperanto to fellow prisoners, telling guards they were teaching Italian, the language of one of Germany's Axis allies.

In Imperial Japan, the left wing of the Japanese Esperanto movement was forbidden, but its leaders were careful enough not to give the impression to the government that the Esperantists were socialist revolutionaries, which proved a successful strategy.

After the October Revolution of 1917, Esperanto was given a measure of government support by the new communist states in the former Russian Empire and later by the Soviet Union government, with the Soviet Esperantist Union being established as an organization that, temporarily, was officially recognized. In his biography on Joseph Stalin, Leon Trotsky mentions that Stalin had studied Esperanto. However, in 1937, at the height of the Great Purge, Stalin completely reversed the Soviet government's policies on Esperanto; many Esperanto speakers were executed, exiled or held in captivity in the Gulag labour camps. Quite often the accusation was: "You are an active member of an international spy organization which hides itself under the name of 'Association of Soviet Esperantists' on the territory of the Soviet Union." Until the end of the Stalin era, it was dangerous to use Esperanto in the Soviet Union, even though it was never officially forbidden to speak Esperanto.

Fascist Italy allowed the use of Esperanto, publishing some tourist material in the language.

During and after the Spanish Civil War, Francoist Spain suppressed anarchists, socialists and Catalan nationalists for many years, among whom the use of Esperanto was extensive, but in the 1950s the Esperanto movement was again tolerated.

=== Modern history ===
In 1954, the United Nations — through UNESCO — granted official support to Esperanto as an international auxiliary language in the Montevideo Resolution. However, Esperanto is not one of the six official languages of the UN.

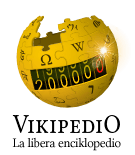
Variant logo for the Esperanto Wikipedia's 200,000-article milestone

The development of Esperanto has continued unabated into the 21st century. The advent of the Internet has had a significant impact on the language, as learning it has become increasingly accessible on platforms such as Duolingo, and as speakers have increasingly networked on platforms such as Amikumu. With up to two million speakers, it is the most widely spoken constructed language in the world. Although no country has adopted Esperanto officially, Esperantujo ("Esperanto-land") is the name given to the collection of places where it is spoken.

On 22 February 2012, Google Translate added Esperanto as its 64th language. On 25 July 2016, Yandex Translate added Esperanto as a language.

As of August 2026, Esperanto Wikipedia (Vikipedio) contains about 391,000 articles, making it the 37th-largest Wikipedia, as measured by the number of articles, and is the largest Wikipedia in a constructed language. About 150,000 users consult the Vikipedio regularly, as attested by Wikipedia's automatically aggregated log-in data, which showed that in October 2019 the website has 117,366 unique individual visitors per month, plus 33,572 who view the site on a mobile device instead.

== Official use ==
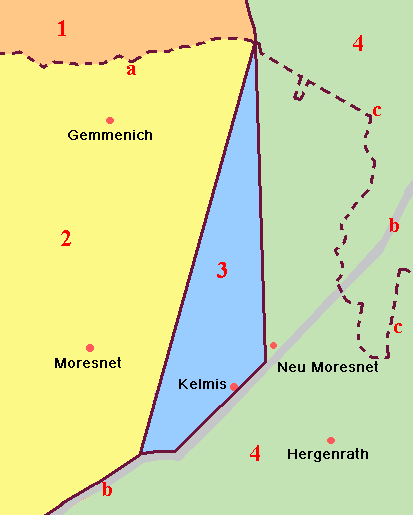
In 1908, Wilhelm Molly proposed making Neutral Moresnet the world's first Esperanto‑speaking state.

=== International organizations ===
Esperanto is the working language of several non-profit international organizations such as the Sennacieca Asocio Tutmonda, a left-wing cultural association which had 724 members in over 85 countries in 2006. There is also Education@Internet, which has developed from an Esperanto organization; most others are specifically Esperanto organizations. The largest of these, the Universal Esperanto Association, has an official consultative relationship with the United Nations and UNESCO, which recognized Esperanto as a medium for international understanding in 1954. The Universal Esperanto Association collaborated in 2017 with UNESCO to deliver an Esperanto translation of its magazine UNESCO Courier (Esperanto: Unesko Kuriero en Esperanto). The World Health Organization offered an Esperanto version of the COVID-19 pandemic occupational safety and health education course.

The League of Nations made attempts to promote the teaching of Esperanto in its member countries, but the resolutions were defeated (mainly by French delegates, who did not feel there was a need for it).

Esperanto was the first language of teaching and administration of the now-defunct International Academy of Sciences San Marino.

All personal documents sold by the World Service Authority, including the World Passport, are written in Esperanto, together with the official languages of the United Nations: English, French, Spanish, Russian, Arabic, and Chinese.

=== Media ===
The Chinese government has used Esperanto since 2001 for an Esperanto version of its China Internet Information Center. China also uses Esperanto in China Radio International, and for the Internet magazine El Popola Ĉinio.

The Vatican Radio has an Esperanto version of its podcasts and its website.

In the summer of 1924, the American Radio Relay League adopted Esperanto as its official international auxiliary language, and hoped that the language would be used by radio amateurs in international communications, but its actual use for radio communications was negligible.

=== Proposed microstates and micronations ===
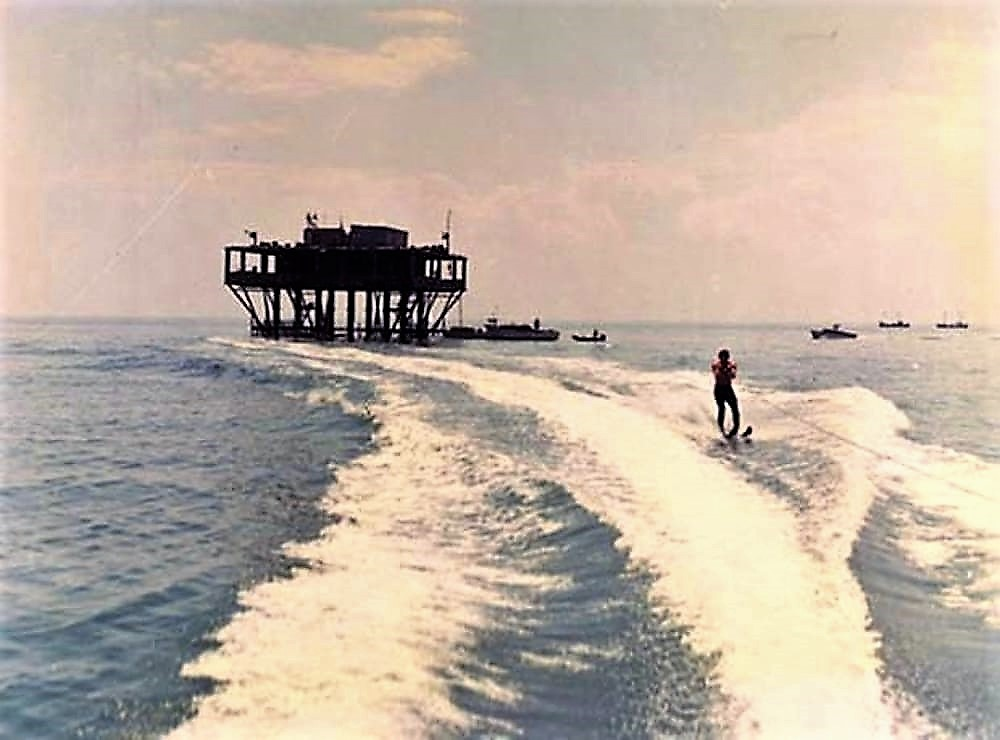
The Republic of Rose Island in the Adriatic Sea used Esperanto as its official language in 1968; it has since been demolished

Beginning in 1908, there were efforts to establish the world's first Esperanto state in Neutral Moresnet, which at the time was a Belgian–Prussian condominium in central-western Europe. Any such efforts came to an end with the beginning of World War I and the German invasion of Belgium, voiding the treaty which established joint sovereignty over the territory. The Treaty of Versailles subsequently awarded the disputed territory to Belgium, effective 10 January 1920.

The self-proclaimed micronation of Rose Island, on an artificial island near Italy in the Adriatic Sea, used Esperanto as its official language in 1968. Another micronation, the extant Republic of Molossia, near Dayton, Nevada, uses Esperanto as an official language alongside English.

== Linguistic properties ==
=== Classification ===
Esperanto has been described as "a language lexically predominantly Romanic, morphologically intensively agglutinative, and to a certain degree isolating in character". Approximately 80% of Esperanto's vocabulary is derived from Romance languages, and the remainder primarily from Germanic, Greek and Slavic languages. New words are formed through extensive use of affixes and compounds.

Typologically, Esperanto has prepositions and a pragmatic word order that by default is subject–verb–object (SVO). Adjectives can be freely placed before or after the nouns they modify, though placing them before the noun is more common. The article la "the", demonstratives such as tiu "that" and prepositions (such as ĉe "at") must come before their related nouns. Similarly, the negative ne "not" and conjunctions such as kaj "and" and ke "that" must precede the phrase or clause that they introduce. In copular (A = B) clauses, word order is just as important as in English: "people are animals" is distinguished from "animals are people".

Esperanto's phonology, grammar, vocabulary, and semantics are based on the Indo-European languages spoken in Europe. Besides his native Yiddish and (Belo)Russian, Zamenhof studied German, Hebrew, Latin, English, Spanish, Lithuanian, Italian, French, Aramaic and Volapük, knowing altogether something of 13 different languages, which had an influence on Esperanto's linguistic properties.

Esperantist and linguist Ilona Koutny notes that Esperanto's vocabulary, phrase structure, agreement systems, and semantic typology are similar to those of Indo-European languages spoken in Europe. However, Koutny and Esperantist Humphrey Tonkin also note that Esperanto has features that are atypical of Indo-European languages spoken in Europe, such as its agglutinative morphology. Claude Piron argued that Esperanto word-formation has more in common with that of Chinese than with typical European languages, and that the number of Esperanto features shared with Slavic languages warrants the identification of a Slavic-derived stratum of language structure that he calls the "Middle Plane". A 2010 linguistic typological study concluded that "Esperanto is indeed somewhat European in character, but considerably less so than the European languages themselves."

=== Phonology ===
Esperanto typically has 22 to 24 consonants (depending on the phonemic analysis and individual speaker), five vowels, and two semivowels that combine with the vowels to form six diphthongs. (The consonant /j/ and semivowel /i̯/ are both written ⟨j⟩, and the uncommon consonant /dz/ is written with the digraph ⟨dz⟩, which is the only consonant that does not have its own letter.) Tone is not used to distinguish meanings of words. Stress is always on the second-to-last vowel in proper Esperanto words, unless a final vowel o is elided, a phenomenon mostly occurring in poetry. For example, familio "family" is [fa.mi.ˈli.o], with the stress on the second i, but when the word is used without the final o (famili’), the stress remains on the second i: [fa.mi.ˈli].

==== Consonants ====
	Labial		Alveolar		Post- alveolar		Velar		Glottal
Nasal	m ⟨m⟩		n ⟨n⟩		(ɲ) ⟨nj⟩ (Note: Zamenhof says that in "severely regular" pronunciation, ⟨nj⟩, as in panjo ('mama'), should be pronounced as a sequence /nj/ rather than as a palatal nasal /ɲ/ (Kalocsay & Waringhien §22). Wennergren considers ⟨nj⟩ to be a simple sequence of /n/ + /j/.)				
Plosive	p ⟨p⟩	b ⟨b⟩	t ⟨t⟩	d ⟨d⟩			k ⟨k⟩	ɡ ⟨g⟩	
Affricate			t͡s ⟨c⟩	(d͡z) ⟨dz⟩ (Note: The uncommon affricate /d͜z/ does not have a distinct letter in the orthography, but is written with the digraph ⟨dz⟩, as in edzo ('husband'). Not everyone agrees with Kalocsay & Waringhien that edzo and peco are a near rhyme, differing only in voicing, or on the status of /d͡z/ as a phoneme; Wennergren considers it to be a simple sequence of /d/ + /z/.)	t͡ʃ ⟨ĉ⟩	d͡ʒ ⟨ĝ⟩			
Fricative	f ⟨f⟩	v ⟨v⟩	s ⟨s⟩	z ⟨z⟩	ʃ ⟨ŝ⟩	ʒ ⟨ĵ⟩	(x) ⟨ĥ⟩ (Note: The phoneme /x/ has largely been replaced with /k/ and is now found in a very few established words such as eĥo ('echo'; cf. eko 'a start'), ĥoro ('a choir', also koruso; cf. koro 'a heart'), ĉeĥo ('a Czech'; cf. ĉeko 'a check'), and ĥano ('a khan'; cf. kano 'reed, cane').)		h ⟨h⟩
Approximant			l ⟨l⟩		j ⟨j⟩				
Trill			r ⟨r⟩						

==== Vowels ====
Since there are only five vowel qualities, significant variation in pronunciation is tolerated. For instance, e commonly ranges from [e] (French é) to [ɛ] (French è). These details often depend on the speaker's native language. A glottal stop may occur between adjacent vowels in some people's speech, especially when the two vowels are the same, as in heroo "hero" ([he.ˈro.o] or [he.ˈro.ʔo]) and praavo "great-grandfather" ([pra.ˈa.vo] or [pra.ˈʔa.vo]).

There are 6 historically stable diphthongs: /ai̯/, /oi̯/, /ui̯/, /ei̯/ and /au̯/, /eu̯/. However, some authors such as John C. Wells regard them as vowel–consonant sequences – /aj/, /oj/, /uj/, /ej/, /aw/, /ew/ – while Wennergren regards /aj/, /oj/, /uj/, /ej/ as vowel–consonant sequences and only /au̯/, /eu̯/ as diphthongs, there otherwise being no /w/ in Esperanto. A few additional sounds found in loan words, such as /ou̯/ and /ji/, are not stable (see below).

The letter ŭ /u̯/ is sometimes used as a consonant in onomatopoeia and unassimilated foreign names (see below).

Monophthongs
	Front	Back
Close	i	u
Mid	e	o
Open	a	

Diphthongs
	Front	Back
Close		ui̯ ⟨uj⟩
Mid	ei̯ ⟨ej⟩ eu̯ ⟨eŭ⟩	oi̯ ⟨oj⟩
Open	ai̯ ⟨aj⟩ au̯ ⟨aŭ⟩	

=== Orthography ===
==== Alphabet ====
The Esperanto alphabet is based on the Latin script, using a one-sound-one-letter principle, with the exception of [d͡z]. It includes six letters with diacritics: five with circumflexes (⟨ĉ⟩, ⟨ĝ⟩, ⟨ĥ⟩, ⟨ĵ⟩, and ⟨ŝ⟩) and one with a breve (⟨ŭ⟩). The alphabet does not include the letters ⟨q⟩, ⟨w⟩, ⟨x⟩, or ⟨y⟩, which are only used in the writing of proper names and unassimilated borrowings.

Esperanto alphabet
Number	1	2	3	4	5	6	7	8	9	10	11	12	13	14	15	16	17	18	19	20	21	22	23	24	25	26	27	28
Upper case	A	B	C	Ĉ	D	E	F	G	Ĝ	H	Ĥ	I	J	Ĵ	K	L	M	N	O	P	R	S	Ŝ	T	U	Ŭ	V	Z
Lower case	a	b	c	ĉ	d	e	f	g	ĝ	h	ĥ	i	j	ĵ	k	l	m	n	o	p	r	s	ŝ	t	u	ŭ	v	z
IPA phoneme	a	b	t͡s	t͡ʃ	d	e	f	ɡ	d͡ʒ	h	x	i	j, i̯	ʒ	k	l	m	n	o	p	r	s	ʃ	t	u	u̯	v	z

The alphabet was designed with a French typewriter in mind. Although modern computers support Unicode, entering the letters with diacritic marks can be more or less problematic with certain operating systems or hardware. One of the first reform proposals (for Esperanto 1894) sought to do away with these marks, and the language Ido went back to the basic Latin alphabet.

==== Phonology ====
All letters lacking diacritics are pronounced approximately as their respective IPA symbols, with the exception of ⟨c⟩.

The letters ⟨j⟩ and ⟨c⟩ are used in a way that is familiar to speakers of many Central and Eastern European languages, but may be unfamiliar to English speakers. ⟨j⟩ has the sound of English ⟨y⟩, as in yellow and boy (Esperanto jes has the same pronunciation as its English cognate yes), and ⟨c⟩ has a "ts" sound, as in hits or the ⟨zz⟩ in pizza. In addition, the ⟨g⟩ in Esperanto is always 'hard', as in gift. Esperanto makes use of the five-vowel system, essentially identical to the vowels of Spanish and Modern Greek.

The accented letters are:

- ⟨ĉ⟩ is pronounced like English ch in chatting
- ⟨ĝ⟩ is pronounced like English g in gem
- ⟨ĥ⟩ is pronounced like the ch in German Bach or Scottish English loch.
- ⟨ĵ⟩ is pronounced like the s in English fusion or the j in French Jacques
- ⟨ŝ⟩ is pronounced like English sh.
- ⟨ŭ⟩ in ⟨aŭ⟩ is pronounced like English ow in cow.

According to one of Zamenhof's entries in the Lingvaj respondoj, the letter ⟨n⟩ ought to be pronounced as [n] in all cases, but a rendering as [ŋ] is admissible before ⟨g⟩, ⟨k⟩, and ⟨ĥ⟩.

==== Diacritics and substitutions ====
Even with the widespread adoption of Unicode, the letters with diacritics (found in the "Latin-Extended A" section of the Unicode Standard) can cause problems with printing and computing, because they are not found on most physical keyboards and are left out of certain fonts.

There are two principal workarounds to this problem, which substitute digraphs for the accented letters. Zamenhof, the inventor of Esperanto, created an "h-convention", which replaces ⟨ĉ⟩, ⟨ĝ⟩, ⟨ĥ⟩, ⟨ĵ⟩, ⟨ŝ⟩, and ⟨ŭ⟩ with ⟨ch⟩, ⟨gh⟩, ⟨hh⟩, ⟨jh⟩, ⟨sh⟩, and ⟨u⟩, respectively. The main issue with this convention is its ambiguity: If used in a database, a program could not easily determine whether to render, for example, ⟨ch⟩ as /c/ followed by /h/ or as /ĉ/. Such words do exist in Esperanto: senchava could not be rendered unambiguously, unless its component parts were intentionally separated, as in senc·hava. A more recent "x-convention" has also gained prominence with the advent of computing, utilizing an otherwise absent ⟨x⟩ to produce the digraphs ⟨cx⟩, ⟨gx⟩, ⟨hx⟩, ⟨jx⟩, ⟨sx⟩, and ⟨ux⟩; this has the incidental advantage of alphabetizing correctly in most cases, since the only letter after ⟨x⟩ is ⟨z⟩.

There are computer keyboard layouts that support the Esperanto alphabet, and some systems use software that automatically replaces x- or h-convention digraphs with the corresponding diacritic letters (for example, Amiketo for Microsoft Windows, Mac OS X, and Linux and Gboard and AnySoftKeyboard for Android). On Linux, the GNOME, Cinnamon, and KDE desktop environments support the entry of characters with Esperanto diacritics.

=== Vocabulary ===
The core vocabulary of Esperanto was defined by Unua Libro, published by Zamenhof in 1887. This book listed 917 roots; these could be expanded into tens of thousands of words using prefixes, suffixes, and compounding. In 1894, Zamenhof published the first Esperanto dictionary, Universala Vortaro, which had a larger set of roots. The rules of the language allowed speakers to borrow new roots as needed; it was recommended, however, that speakers take basic international forms and derive related meanings from these.

Since then, many words have been borrowed, primarily (but not solely) from the European languages. Not all proposed borrowings become widespread, but many do, especially technical and scientific terms. Terms for everyday use, on the other hand, are more likely to be derived from existing roots; komputilo "computer", for instance, is formed from the verb komputi "compute" and the suffix -ilo "tool". Words are also calqued; that is, words acquire new meanings based on usage in other languages. For example, the word muso "mouse" has acquired the meaning of a computer mouse from its usage in many languages (English mouse, French souris, Dutch muis, Spanish ratón, etc.). Esperanto speakers often debate about whether a particular borrowing is justified or whether meaning can be expressed by deriving from or extending the meaning of existing words.

Some compounds and formed words in Esperanto are not entirely straightforward; for example, eldoni, literally "give out", means "publish", paralleling the usage of certain European languages (such as German herausgeben, Dutch uitgeven, Russian издать izdat'). In addition, the suffix -um- has no defined meaning; words using the suffix must be learned separately (such as dekstren "to the right" and dekstrumen "clockwise").

There are not many idiomatic or slang words in Esperanto, as these forms of speech tend to make international communication difficult—working against Esperanto's main goal.

=== Grammar ===
Esperanto words are mostly derived by stringing together roots, grammatical endings, and at times prefixes and suffixes. This process is regular so that people can create new words as they speak and be understood. Compound words are formed with a modifier-first, head-final order, as in English (compare "birdsong" and "songbird", and likewise, birdokanto and kantobirdo). Speakers may optionally insert an o between the words in a compound noun if placing them together directly without the o would make the resulting word hard to say or understand.

The different parts of speech are marked by their own suffixes: all common nouns are marked with the suffix -o, all adjectives with -a, all derived adverbs with -e, and all verbs except the jussive (or imperative) and infinitive end in -s, specifically in one of six tense and mood suffixes, such as the present tense -as; the jussive mood, which is tenseless, ends in -u. Nouns and adjectives have two cases: nominative for grammatical subjects and in general, and accusative for direct objects and (after a preposition) to indicate direction of movement.

Singular nouns used as grammatical subjects end in -o, plural subject nouns in -oj (pronounced [oi̯] like English "oy"). Singular direct object forms end in -on, and plural direct objects with the combination -ojn ([oi̯n]; rhymes with "coin"): -o indicates that the word is a noun, -j indicates the plural, and -n indicates the accusative (direct object) case. Adjectives agree with their nouns; their endings are singular subject -a ([a]; rhymes with "ha!"), plural subject -aj ([ai̯], pronounced "eye"), singular object -an, and plural object -ajn ([ai̯n]; rhymes with "fine"). In the past some people found the Classical Greek forms of the plural (nouns in -oj, adjectives in -aj) to be awkward, proposing instead that Italian -i be used for nouns, and that no plural be used for adjectives. These suggestions were adopted by the Ido reform.

Noun	Subject	Object
Singular	-o	-on
Plural	-oj	-ojn

Adjective	Subject	Object
Singular	-a	-an
Plural	-aj	-ajn

The suffix -n, besides indicating the direct object, is used to indicate movement and a few other things as well.

The six verb inflections consist of three tenses and three moods. They are present tense -as, future tense -os, past tense -is, infinitive mood -i, conditional mood -us and jussive mood -u (used for wishes and commands). Verbs are not marked for person or number. Thus, kanti means "to sing", mi kantas means "I sing", vi kantas means "you sing", and ili kantas means "they sing".

Verbal tense	Suffix
Present	-as (kantas)
Past	-is (kantis)
Future	-os (kantos)

Verbal mood	Suffix
Infinitive	-i (kanti)
Jussive	-u (kantu)
Conditional	-us (kantus)

=== Gender-neutrality ===
Esperanto is sometimes accused of being inherently sexist, because the default form of some nouns is used for descriptions of men while a derived form is used for the women. This is said to retain traces of the male-dominated society of late 19th-century Europe of which Esperanto is a product. These nouns are primarily titles, such as baron/baroness, and kinship terms, such as sinjoro "Mr, sir" vs. sinjorino "Ms, lady" and patro "father" vs. patrino "mother". Before the movement toward equal rights for women, this also applied to professional roles assumed to be predominantly male, such as doktoro, a holder of a doctorate (male or unspecified), versus doktorino, a female doctorate-holder. This paralleled the contemporary situation with the English suffix -ess, as in the words waiter/waitress, actor/actress, etc.

On the other hand, the pronoun ĝi ("it") may be used generically to mean he/she/they; the pronoun li ("he") is always masculine and ŝi ("she") is always female, despite some authors' arguments. A gender-neutral singular pronoun ri has gradually become more widely used in recent years, although it is minority usage. The plural pronoun ili ("they") is always neutral, while nouns with the prefix ge– specifically includes both sexes, for example gesinjoroj (equivalent, depending on context, to either sinjoro kaj sinjorino "Mr. and Ms." or sinjoroj kaj sinjorinoj "Ladies and Gentlemen"), gepatroj "parents" (equivalent to patro kaj patrino "mother and father").

=== Simple phrases ===
Listed below are some useful Esperanto words and phrases along with IPA transcriptions:

English	Esperanto	IPA
Hello	Saluton	[sa.ˈlu.ton]
Yes	Jes	[ˈjes]
No	Ne	[ˈne]
Good morning	Bonan matenon	[ˈbo.nan ma.ˈte.non]
Good day	Bonan tagon	[ˈbo.nan ˈta.gon]
Good evening	Bonan vesperon	[ˈbo.nan ves.ˈpe.ron]
Good night	Bonan nokton	[ˈbo.nan ˈnok.ton]
Goodbye	Ĝis (la revido)	[ˈd͡ʒis (la re.ˈvi.do)]
What is your name?	Kio estas via nomo? / Kiel vi nomiĝas?	[ˈki.o ˌes.tas ˌvi.a ˈno.mo] / [ˈki.el ˌvi no.ˈmi.d͡ʒas]
My name is Marco.	Mia nomo estas Marko / Mi nomiĝas Marko	[ˌmi.a ˈno.mo ˌes.tas ˈmar.ko] / [mi no.ˌmi.d͡ʒas ˈmar.ko]
How are you?	Kiel vi fartas?	[ˈki.el vi ˈfar.tas]
I am well.	Mi fartas bone	[mi ˈfar.tas ˈbo.ne]
Do you speak Esperanto?	Ĉu vi parolas Esperanton?	[ˈt͡ʃu vi pa.ˈro.las ˌes.pe.ˈran.ton]
I don't understand you	Mi ne komprenas vin	[mi ˌne kom.ˈpre.nas vin]
All right	Bone / En ordo	[ˈbo.ne] / [en ˈor.do]
Okay	Bone / En ordo	[ˈbo.ne] / [en ˈor.do]
Thank you	Dankon	[ˈdan.kon]
You're welcome	Ne dankinde / Nedankinde	[ˌne.dan.ˈkin.de]
Please	Bonvolu / Mi petas	[bon.ˈvo.lu] / [mi ˈpe.tas]
Forgive me/Excuse me	Pardonu min	[par.ˈdo.nu min]
Bless you!	Sanon!	[ˈsa.non]
Congratulations!	Gratulon!	[ɡra.ˈtu.lon]
I love you	Mi amas vin	[mi ˈa.mas vin]
One beer, please	Unu bieron, mi petas	[ˈu.nu bi.ˈe.ron, mi ˈpe.tas]
Where is the toilet?	Kie estas la necesejo?	[ˈki.e ˌes.tas la ˌne.t͡se.ˈse.jo]
What is that?	Kio estas tio?	[ˈki.o ˌes.tas ˈti.o]
That is a dog	Tio estas hundo	[ˈti.o ˌes.tas ˈhun.do]
We will love!	Ni amos!	[ni ˈa.mos]
Peace!	Pacon!	[ˈpa.t͡son]
I am a beginner in Esperanto.	Mi estas komencanto de Esperanto	[mi ˌes.tas ˌko.men.ˈt͡san.to de ˌes.pe.ˈran.to]

=== Sample texts ===
Sample texts
Text in Esperanto	Text in English	Source and attribution
Ĉiuj homoj estas denaske liberaj kaj egalaj laŭ digno kaj rajtoj. Ili posedas racion kaj konsciencon, kaj devus konduti unu al alia en spirito de frateco.	All human beings are born free and equal in dignity and rights. They are endowed with reason and conscience and should act towards one another in a spirit of brotherhood.	The Universal Declaration of Human Rights, Article I
En multaj lokoj de Ĉinio estis temploj de la drako-reĝo. Dum trosekeco oni preĝis en la temploj, ke la drako-reĝo donu pluvon al la homa mondo. Tiam drako estis simbolo de la supernatura estaĵo. Kaj pli poste, ĝi fariĝis prapatro de la plej altaj regantoj kaj simbolis la absolutan aŭtoritaton de la feŭda imperiestro. La imperiestro pretendis, ke li estas la filo de la drako. Ĉiuj liaj vivbezonaĵoj portis la nomon drako kaj estis ornamitaj per diversaj drakofiguroj. Nun ĉie en Ĉinio videblas drako-ornamentaĵoj, kaj cirkulas legendoj pri drakoj. Listen to this excerpt	In many places in China, there were temples of the dragon-king. During times of drought, people would pray in the temples that the dragon-king would give rain to the human world. At that time the dragon was a symbol of the supernatural creature. Later on, it became the ancestor of the highest rulers and symbolized the absolute authority of a feudal emperor. The emperor claimed to be the son of the dragon. All of his personal possessions carried the name "dragon" and were decorated with various dragon figures. Now dragon decorations can be seen everywhere in China, and legends about dragons circulate.	Excerpt translated from a pedagogical Esperanto textbook discussing cultural mythology in China.
Maljusteco ie ajn estas minaco al justeco ĉie ajn. Ni estas kaptitaj en neevitebla reto de reciproka kunrilato, ligitaj en unuopa vesto de destino. Kio ajn tuŝas iun rekte, tuŝas ĉiujn malrekte. Ni havas respondecon ne nur laŭleĝan, sed ankaŭ moralan, por obei justajn leĝojn, kaj moralan respondecon por malobei maljustajn leĝojn. Protekti la rajtojn de la individuo estas protekti la integrecon de la homa familio. Ni devas labori senĉese por levi nian nacian politikon el la movsablo de rasa maljusteco al la solida roko de homa digno, kreante mondon, kie ĉiu viro kaj virino estas respektataj kiel infano de la universo.	Injustice anywhere is a threat to justice everywhere. We are caught in an inescapable network of mutuality, tied in a single garment of destiny. Whatever affects one directly, affects all indirectly. We have not only a legal but a moral responsibility to obey just laws, and a moral responsibility to disobey unjust laws. To protect the rights of the individual is to protect the integrity of the human family. We must work unceasingly to lift our national policy from the quicksand of racial injustice to the solid rock of human dignity, creating a world where every man and woman is respected as a child of the universe.	Paraphrased summary of central arguments from Martin Luther King Jr.'s open letter on civil disobedience, justice, and moral responsibility, written during his imprisonment in Birmingham.

== Education ==
=== Formal education ===
Esperanto has not been a secondary official language of any recognized country. Esperanto instruction is occasionally available at schools, including four primary schools in a pilot project under the supervision of the University of Manchester, and by one count at a few universities. Esperanto has entered the education systems of several countries, including Hungary and China.

Outside China and Hungary, Esperanto education mostly involves informal arrangements, rather than dedicated departments or state sponsorship. Eötvös Loránd University in Budapest had a department of Interlinguistics and Esperanto from 1966 to 2004, after which time instruction moved to vocational colleges; there are state examinations for Esperanto instructors. Additionally, Adam Mickiewicz University in Poland offers a diploma in Interlinguistics. The Senate of Brazil passed a bill in 2009 that would make Esperanto an optional part of the curriculum in public schools, although mandatory if there is demand for it. As of 2015, the bill is still under consideration by the Chamber of Deputies.

In the United States, Esperanto is notably offered as a weekly evening course at Stanford University's Bechtel International Center. Conversational Esperanto, The International Language, is a free drop-in class that is open to Stanford students and the general public on campus during the academic year. With administrative permission, Stanford students can take the class for two credits a quarter through the Linguistics Department.

Esperanto-USA suggests that Esperanto can be learned in, at most, one quarter of the amount of time required for other languages.

=== Internet resources ===
Esperanto speakers often learn the language through self-directed study, online tutorials, and correspondence courses taught by volunteers.

On 28 May 2015, the language learning platform Duolingo launched a free Esperanto course for English speakers. On 25 March 2016, when the first Duolingo Esperanto course completed its beta-testing phase, that course had 350,000 people registered to learn Esperanto through the medium of English. By July 2018, the number of learners had risen to 1.36 million.

As of October 2018, Lernu!, another online learning platform for Esperanto, had 320,000 registered users, and nearly 75,000 monthly visits.

The language-learning platforms Drops, Memrise and LingQ also have materials for Esperanto.

=== The Zagreb method ===
The Zagreb method is an Esperanto teaching method that was developed in the city of Zagreb in the late 1970s to early 1980s as a response to the unsatisfactory learning outcomes of traditional natural-language teaching techniques when used for Esperanto. Its goal was to streamline the material in order to equip learners with practical knowledge that could be put to use in as short a time frame as possible. It is now implemented and available on some of the well-known learning websites in the community.

=== Third-language acquisition ===
From 2006 to 2011, four primary schools in Britain, with 230 pupils, followed a course in "propaedeutic Esperanto"—that is, instruction in Esperanto to raise language awareness, and to accelerate subsequent learning of foreign languages—under the supervision of the University of Manchester. As they put it,

Many schools used to teach children the recorder, not to produce a nation of recorder players, but as a preparation for learning other instruments. [We teach] Esperanto, not to produce a nation of Esperanto-speakers, but as a preparation for learning other languages.

The results showed that the pupils achieved enhanced metalinguistic awareness, though the study did not indicate whether a course in a language other than Esperanto would have led to similar results. Similar studies have been conducted in New Zealand, the United States, England, and Germany. Many of these experiments' findings were compromised by unclear objectives, brief or anecdotal reporting, and a lack of methodological rigor. However, the results of these studies were consistently favorable, and suggested that studying Esperanto before another foreign language expedites the acquisition of the other, natural language.

== Community ==
=== Geography and demography ===
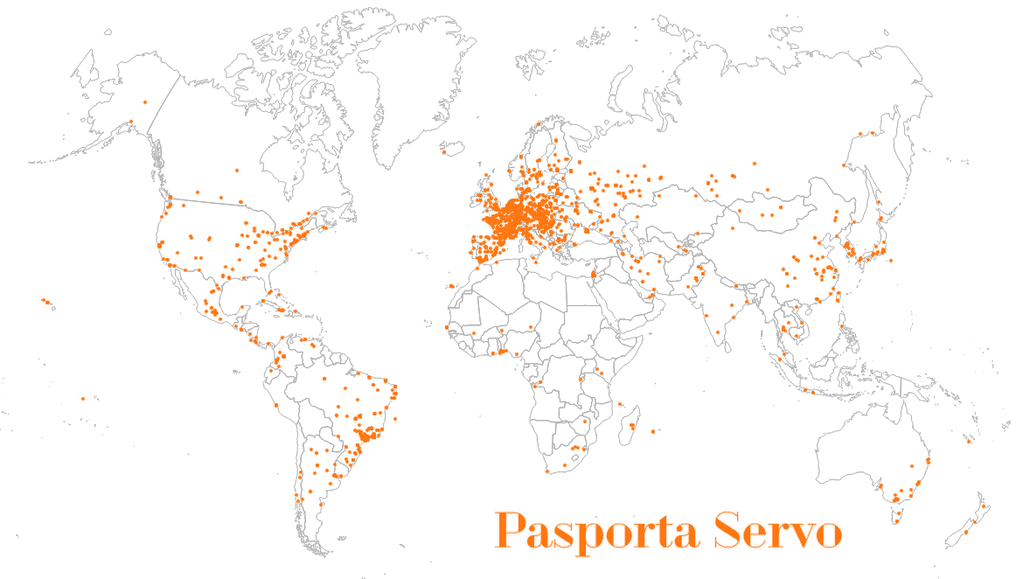
Location map of hosts of Pasporta Servo, the Esperanto homestay community, by 2015

Esperanto is by far the most widely spoken constructed language in the world. Speakers are most numerous in Europe and East Asia, especially in urban areas, where they often form Esperanto clubs. Esperanto is particularly prevalent in the northern and central countries of Europe; in China, South Korea, Japan, and Iran within Asia; in Brazil, and the United States in the Americas; and in Togo in Africa.

Countering a common criticism against Esperanto, the statistician Svend Nielsen has found no significant correlation between the number of Esperanto speakers and the similarity of a given national native language to Esperanto. He concludes that Esperanto tends to be more popular in rich countries with widespread Internet access and a tendency to contribute more to science and culture. Linguistic diversity within a country was found to have no, or perhaps a slightly reductive, correlation with Esperanto popularity.

=== Number of speakers ===
An estimate of the number of Esperanto speakers was made by Sidney S. Culbert, a retired psychology professor at the University of Washington and a longtime Esperantist, who tracked down and tested Esperanto speakers in sample areas in dozens of countries over a period of twenty years. Culbert concluded that between one and two million people speak Esperanto at Foreign Service Level 3, "professionally proficient" (able to communicate moderately complex ideas without hesitation, and to follow speeches, radio broadcasts, etc.). Culbert's estimate was not made for Esperanto alone, but formed part of his listing of estimates for all languages of more than one million speakers, published annually in the World Almanac and Book of Facts. Culbert's most detailed account of his methodology is found in a 1989 letter to David Wolff. Since Culbert never published detailed intermediate results for particular countries and regions, it is difficult to independently gauge the accuracy of his results.

In the Almanac, his estimates for numbers of language speakers were rounded to the nearest million, thus the number of Esperanto speakers is shown as two million. This latter figure appears in Ethnologue. Assuming that this figure is accurate, that means that about 0.03% of the world's population speaks the language. Although it does not meet Zamenhof's goal of a universal language, it still represents a level of popularity unmatched by any other constructed language.

Marcus Sikosek (now Ziko van Dijk) has challenged this figure of 1.6 million as exaggerated. He estimated that even if Esperanto speakers were evenly distributed, assuming one million Esperanto speakers worldwide would lead one to expect about 180 in the city of Cologne. Van Dijk finds only 30 fluent speakers in that city, and similarly smaller-than-expected figures in several other places thought to have a larger-than-average concentration of Esperanto speakers. He also notes that there are a total of about 20,000 members of the various Esperanto organizations (other estimates are higher). Though there are undoubtedly many Esperanto speakers who are not members of any Esperanto organization, he thinks it unlikely that there are fifty times more speakers than organization members.

In 1996, Finnish linguist Jouko Lindstedt, an expert on native-born Esperanto speakers, presented the following scheme to show the overall proportions of language capabilities within the Esperanto community:

- 1,000 have Esperanto as their native family language.
- 10,000 speak it fluently.
- 100,000 can use it actively.
- One million understand a large amount passively.
- Ten million have studied it to some extent at some time.

In 2017, doctoral student Svend Nielsen estimated around 63,000 Esperanto speakers worldwide, taking into account association memberships, user-generated data from Esperanto websites and census statistics. This number, however, was disputed by statistician Sten Johansson, who questioned the reliability of the source data and highlighted a wide margin of error, the latter point with which Nielsen agrees. Both have stated, however, that this new number is likely more realistic than some earlier projections.

In the absence of Culbert's detailed sampling data, or any other census data, it is impossible to state the number of speakers with certainty. According to the website of the Universal Esperanto Association:

Numbers of textbooks sold and membership of local societies put "the number of people with some knowledge of the language in the hundreds of thousands and possibly millions".

=== Native speakers ===
Native Esperanto speakers (eo: denaskuloj, lit. 'person from/since birth') have learned the language from birth from Esperanto-speaking parents. This usually happens when Esperanto is the chief or only common language in an international family, but sometimes occurs in a family of Esperanto speakers who often use the language. In 2004, an estimated 2,000 children in about a thousand families use Esperanto as one of their languages. Citing this research, the 2022 edition of Ethnologue gives 1,000 first language users.

However, native speakers do not occupy an authoritative position in the Esperanto community, as they would in other language communities. This presents a challenge to linguists, whose usual source of grammaticality and meanings are native speakers.

=== Culture ===
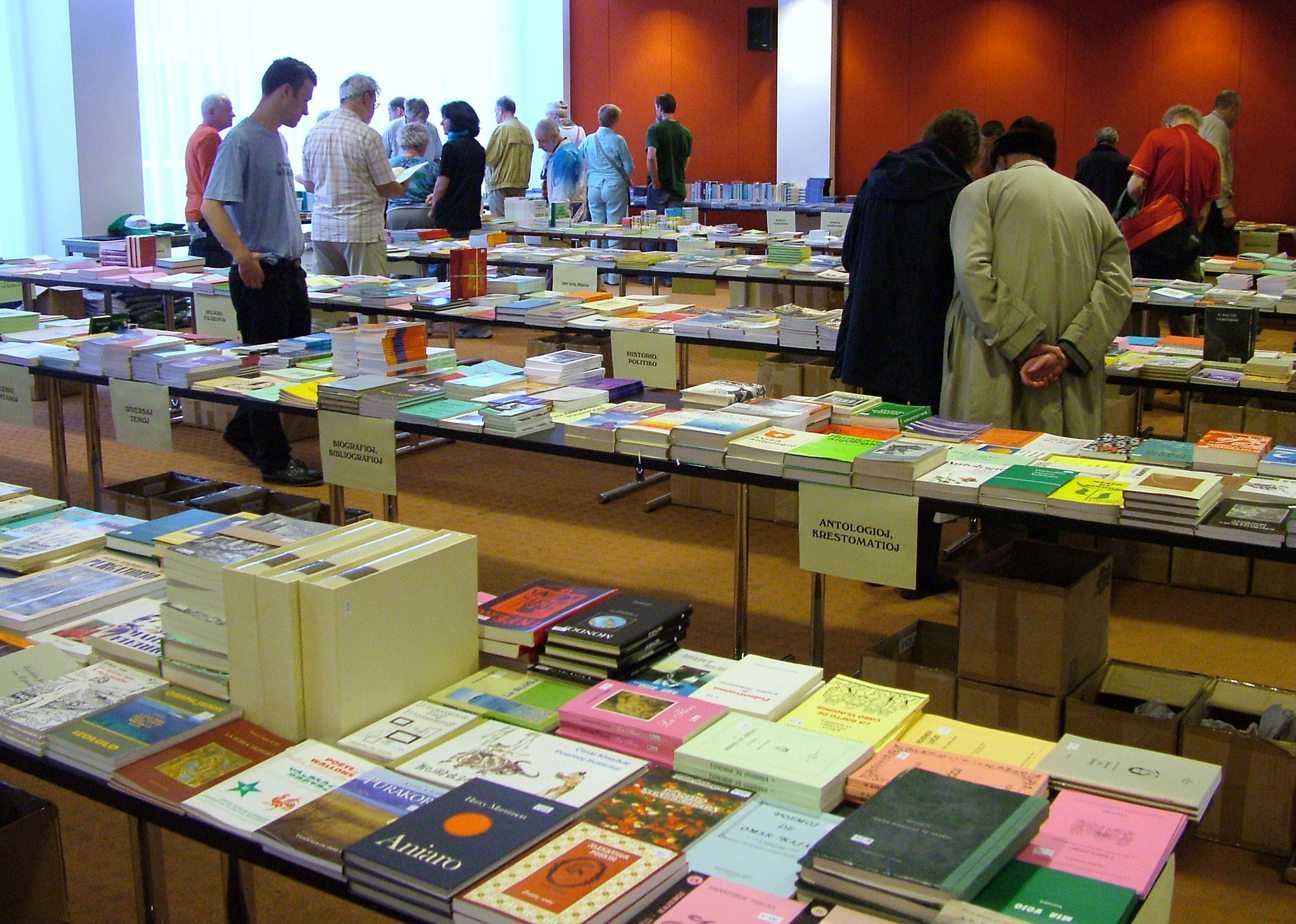
Esperanto books at the World Esperanto Congress, Rotterdam 2008

Esperantists participate in an international culture, including a large body of original as well as translated literature. There are more than 25,000 Esperanto books, both originals and translations, as well as several regularly distributed Esperanto magazines. In 2013, a museum about Esperanto opened in China. Esperantists use the language for free accommodations with Esperantists in 92 countries using the Pasporta Servo or to develop pen pals through Esperanto Koresponda Servo.

Every year, Esperantists meet for the World Congress of Esperanto (Universala Kongreso de Esperanto). World congresses have been held in different countries every year, except during the two World Wars, and the 2020 COVID-19 pandemic (when it was moved to an online-only event). Since the Second World War, they have been attended by an average of more than 2,000 people, and up to 6,000 people at the most.

Historically, much music has been written in the language such as Kaj Tiel Plu. There is also a variety of classical and semi-classical choral music, both original and translated, as well as large ensemble music that includes voices singing Esperanto texts. Lou Harrison, who incorporated styles and instruments from many world cultures in his music, used Esperanto titles and/or texts in several of his works, most notably La Koro-Sutro (1973). David Gaines used Esperanto poems as well as an excerpt from a speech by Zamenhof for his Symphony No. One (Esperanto) for mezzo-soprano and orchestra (1994–98). He wrote original Esperanto text for his Povas plori mi ne plu (I Can Cry No Longer) for unaccompanied SATB choir (1994).

There are also shared holidays, such as Zamenhof Day (also known as Esperanto Book Day, December 15) and Esperanto Day (July 26).

Proponents of Esperanto, such as Humphrey Tonkin, a professor at the University of Hartford, argue that Esperanto is "culturally neutral by design, as it was intended to be a facilitator between cultures, not to be the carrier of any one national culture". The late Scottish Esperanto author William Auld wrote extensively on the subject, arguing that Esperanto is "the expression of a common human culture, unencumbered by national frontiers. Thus it is considered a culture on its own."

== Esperanto heritage ==
Several Esperanto associations also advance Esperanto education, and aim to preserve its culture and heritage. Poland added Esperanto to its list of intangible cultural heritage in 2014.

=== Notable authors in Esperanto ===
- William Auld
- Julio Baghy
- Kazimierz Bein (Kabe)
- Marjorie Boulton
- Jorge Camacho
- Vasili Eroshenko
- Jean Forge
- Antoni Grabowski
- Kálmán Kalocsay
- Anna Löwenstein
- Kenji Miyazawa (translated his pre-existing works into Esperanto)
- Nikolai Nekrasov
- István Nemere
- Claude Piron
- Edmond Privat
- Frederic Pujulà i Vallès
- Baldur Ragnarsson
- Reto Rossetti
- Raymond Schwartz
- Tibor Sekelj
- Tivadar Soros
- Spomenka Štimec
- Éva Tófalvy
- Vladimir Varankin
- Gaston Waringhien
- L. L. Zamenhof
- Þórbergur Þórðarson

=== Popular culture ===
In the futuristic novel Lord of the World by Robert Hugh Benson, Esperanto is presented as the predominant language of the world, much as Latin is the language of the Catholic Church. A reference to Esperanto appears in the science-fiction story War with the Newts by Karel Čapek, published in 1936. As part of a passage on what language the salamander-looking creatures with human cognitive ability should learn, it is noted that "...in the Reform schools, Esperanto was taught as the medium of communication." (p. 206).

Esperanto has been used in many films and novels. The Charlie Chaplin film The Great Dictator (1940) showed Jewish ghetto shop signs in Esperanto. Two full-length feature films have been produced with dialogue entirely in Esperanto: Angoroj, in 1964, and Incubus, a 1965 B-movie horror film which is also notable for starring William Shatner shortly before he began working on Star Trek. In Captain Fantastic (2016) there is a dialogue in Esperanto. The 1994 film Street Fighter contains Esperanto dialogue spoken by the character Sagat. The character Arnold Rimmer in the TV series Red Dwarf shows many attempts to learn Esperanto, as expected of an officer in the Space Corps, something he aspires, but continually fails, to become. Finally, Mexican film director Alfonso Cuarón has publicly shown his fascination for Esperanto, going as far as naming his film production company Esperanto Filmoj ("Esperanto Films").

Esperanto was one of the constructed languages explored in episode 57 of the popular podcast Let's Learn Everything by Dr Ella Hubber. The podcast also features Caroline Roper and Tom Lum, who were learning about the constructed languages in this episode.

Esperanto's flexible vocabulary system allows it to continues to adapt to modern technology and appear in contemporary digital culture.

=== Esperanto and machine translation ===
Apart from translation tools like DeepL and Google Translate, Esperanto is included in the No Language Left Behind (NLLB) initiative, a highly multilingual model family, capable of translating among more than 200 languages. Esperanto is also included in the FLORES+ benchmark, which provides professionally translated, multi-domain test sets for translation between Esperanto and 200 other languages.

=== Science ===
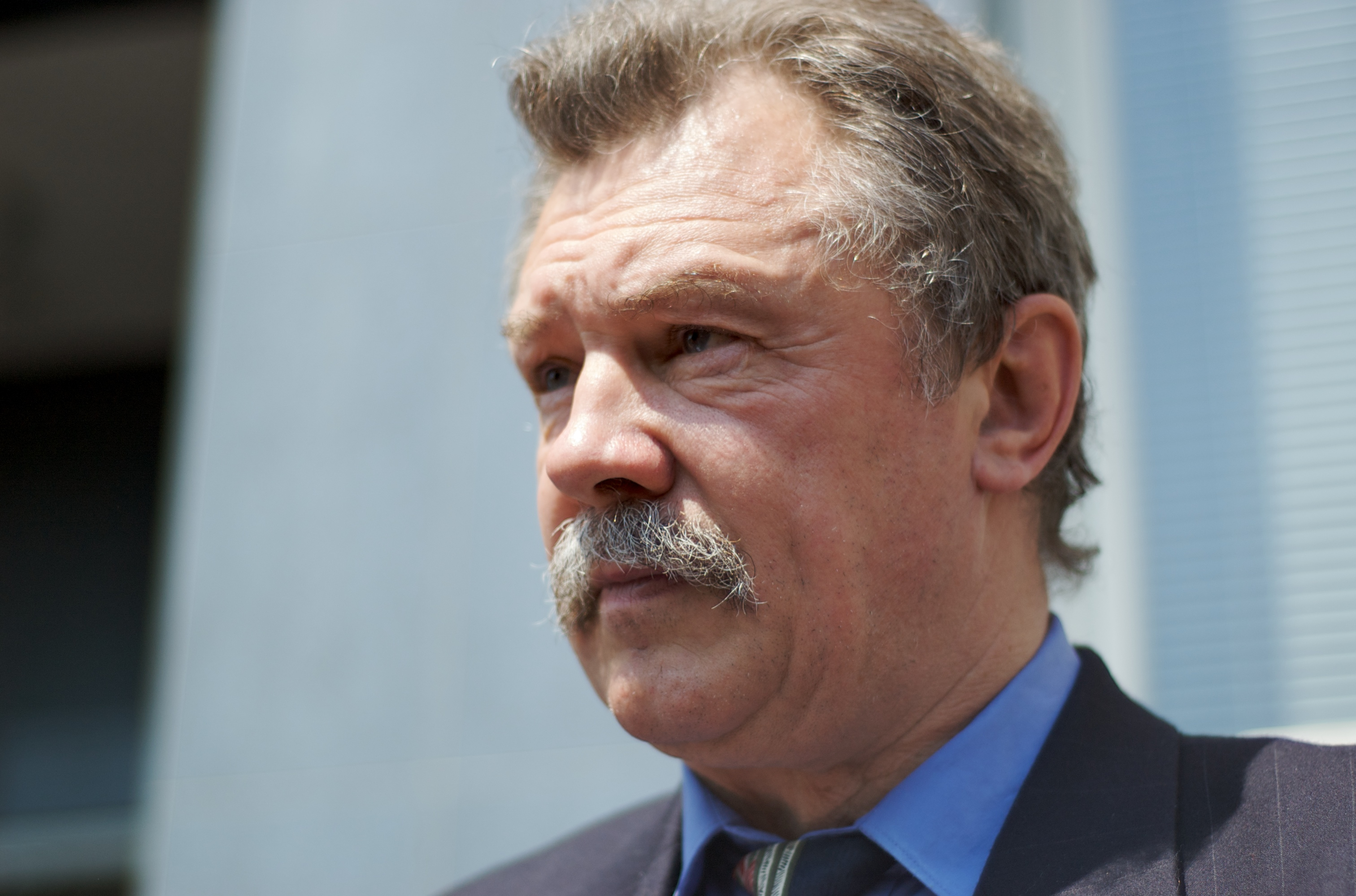
Hungarian Cosmonaut Bertalan Farkas, the first Esperantist in space

In 1921 the French Academy of Sciences recommended using Esperanto for international scientific communication. A few scientists and mathematicians, such as Maurice Fréchet (mathematics), John C. Wells (linguistics), Helmar Frank (pedagogy and cybernetics), and Nobel laureate Reinhard Selten (economics) have published part of their work in Esperanto. Frank and Selten were among the founders of the International Academy of Sciences in San Marino, sometimes called the "Esperanto University", where Esperanto was the primary language of teaching and administration.

=== Commerce and trade ===
Esperanto business groups have been active for many years. Research conducted in the 1920s by the French Chamber of Commerce and reported in The New York Times suggested that Esperanto seemed to be the best business language.

=== Goals of the movement ===
Zamenhof had three goals, as he wrote in 1887: to create an easy language, to create a language ready to use "whether the language be universally accepted or not" and to find some means to get many people to learn the language. So Zamenhof's intention was not only to create an easy-to-learn language to foster peace and international understanding as a general language, but also to create a language for immediate use by a (small) language community. Esperanto was to serve as an international auxiliary language, that is, as a universal second language, not to replace ethnic languages. This goal was shared by Zamenhof among Esperanto speakers at the beginning of the movement. Later, Esperanto speakers began to see the language and the culture that had grown up around it as ends in themselves, even if Esperanto is never adopted by the United Nations or other international organizations.

Esperanto speakers who want to see Esperanto adopted officially or on a large scale worldwide are commonly called finvenkistoj, from fina venko, meaning "final victory". There are two kinds of finvenkismo: desubismo aims to spread Esperanto between ordinary people (desube, from below) to form a steadily growing community of Esperanto speakers, while desuprismo aims to act from above (desupre), beginning with politicians. Zamenhof considered the first way more plausible, as "for such affairs as ours, governments come with their approval and help usually only when everything is completely ready".

Those who focus on the intrinsic value of the language are commonly called raŭmistoj, from Rauma, Finland, where a declaration on the short-term improbability of the fina venko and the value of Esperanto culture was made at the International Youth Congress in 1980. However the "Manifesto de Raŭmo" clearly mentions the intention to further spread the language: "We want to spread Esperanto to put into effect its positive values more and more, step by step".

In 1996 the Prague Manifesto was adopted at the annual congress of the Universal Esperanto Association (UEA); it was subscribed to by individual participants and later by other Esperanto speakers. More recently, language-learning apps like Duolingo and Amikumu have helped to increase the amount of fluent speakers of Esperanto, and find others in their area to speak the language with.

=== Symbols and flags ===
Esperanto symbols

The flag of Esperanto

The verda stelo

The jubilea simbolo

The earliest flag, and the one most commonly used today, features a green five-pointed star against a white canton, upon a field of green. It was proposed to Zamenhof by Richard Geoghegan, author of the first Esperanto textbook for English speakers, in 1887. The flag was approved in 1905 by delegates to the first conference of Esperantists at Boulogne-sur-Mer.

The green star on white (la verda stelo) is also used by itself as a round (buttonhole, etc.) emblem by many esperantists, among other reasons to enhance their visibility outside the Esperanto world.

A version with an E superimposed over the green star is sometimes seen. Other variants include that for Christian Esperantists, with a white Christian cross superimposed upon the green star, and that for Leftists, with the color of the field changed from green to red.

In 1987, a second flag design was chosen in a contest organized by the UEA celebrating the first centennial of the language. It featured a white background with two stylised curved "E"s facing each other. Dubbed the jubilea simbolo (jubilee symbol), it attracted criticism from some Esperantists, who dubbed it the melono (melon) for its elliptical shape. It is still in use, though to a lesser degree than the traditional symbol, known as the verda stelo (green star).

=== Politics ===
Esperanto has been placed in many proposed political situations. The most popular of these is the Europe–Democracy–Esperanto, which aims to establish Esperanto as the official language of the European Union. In 2005, Swiss economist François Grin published a report at the request of the Haut conseil de l'éducation that found that the use of English as the lingua franca within the European Union costs billions annually and significantly benefits English-speaking countries financially. The report considered a scenario where Esperanto would be the lingua franca, and found that it would have many advantages, particularly economically speaking, as well as ideologically.

Left-wing currents exist in the wider Esperanto world, mostly organized through the Sennacieca Asocio Tutmonda founded by French theorist Eugène Lanti. Other notable Esperanto socialists include Nikolai Nekrasov and Vladimir Varankin, both of whom were put to death in October 1938 during the Stalinist repressions. Nekrasov was accused of being "an organizer and leader of a fascist, espionage, terrorist organization of Esperantists."

=== Religion ===
==== Oomoto ====
The Oomoto religion in Japan encourages the use of Esperanto among its followers and includes Zamenhof as one of its deified spirits.

==== Baháʼí Faith ====
The Baháʼí Faith encourages the use of an auxiliary international language. ʻAbdu'l-Bahá praised the ideal of Esperanto, and there was an affinity between Esperantists and Baháʼís during the late 19th century and early 20th century.

On 12 February 1913, ʻAbdu'l-Bahá gave a talk to the Paris Esperanto Society, stating:

Now, praise be to God that Dr. Zamenhof has invented the Esperanto language. It has all the potential qualities of becoming the international means of communication. All of us must be grateful and thankful to him for this noble effort; for in this way he has served his fellowmen well. With untiring effort and self-sacrifice on the part of its devotees Esperanto will become universal. Therefore every one of us must study this language and spread it as far as possible so that day by day it may receive a broader recognition, be accepted by all nations and governments of the world, and become a part of the curriculum in all the public schools. I hope that Esperanto will be adopted as the language of all the future international conferences and congresses, so that all people need acquire only two languages—one their own tongue and the other the international language. Then perfect union will be established between all the people of the world. Consider how difficult it is today to communicate with various nations. If one studies fifty languages one may yet travel through a country and not know the language. Therefore I hope that you will make the utmost effort, so that this language of Esperanto may be widely spread.

Lidia Zamenhof, daughter of L. L. Zamenhof, became a Baháʼí around 1925. James Ferdinand Morton Jr., an early member of the Baháʼí Faith in Greater Boston, was vice-president of the Esperanto League for North America. Ehsan Yarshater, the founding editor of Encyclopædia Iranica, notes how as a child in Iran he learned Esperanto and that when his mother was visiting Haifa on a Baháʼí pilgrimage he wrote her a letter in Persian as well as Esperanto. At the request of ʻAbdu'l-Bahá, Agnes Baldwin Alexander became an early advocate of Esperanto and used it to spread the Baháʼí teachings at meetings and conferences in Japan.

Today there exists an active sub-community of Baháʼí Esperantists and various volumes of Baháʼí literature have been translated into Esperanto. In 1973, the Baháʼí Esperanto-League for active Baháʼí supporters of Esperanto was founded.

==== Spiritism ====
In 1908, spiritist Camilo Chaigneau wrote an article named "Spiritism and Esperanto" in the periodical La Vie d'Outre-Tombe recommending the use of Esperanto in a "central magazine" for all spiritists and Esperantists. Esperanto then became actively promoted by spiritists, at least in Brazil, initially by Ismael Gomes Braga and František Lorenz; the latter is known in Brazil as Francisco Valdomiro Lorenz, and was a pioneer of both spiritist and Esperantist movements in this country. The Brazilian Spiritist Federation publishes Esperanto coursebooks, translations of Spiritism's basic books, and encourages Spiritists to become Esperantists.

William T. Stead, a famous spiritualist and occultist in the United Kingdom, co-founded the first Esperanto club in the U.K.

==== Theosophy ====
The Teozofia Esperanta Ligo (Theosophical Esperantist League) was formed in 1911, and the organization's journal, Espero Teozofia, was published from 1913 to 1928.

==== Bible translations ====
The first translation of the Bible into Esperanto was a translation of the Hebrew Bible by L. L. Zamenhof. The translation was reviewed and compared with other languages' translations by a group of British clergy and scholars before its publication at the British and Foreign Bible Society in 1910. In 1926 this was published along with a translation of the New Testament, in an edition commonly called the "Londona Biblio". In the 1960s, the Internacia Asocio de Bibliistoj kaj Orientalistoj tried to organize a new, ecumenical Esperanto translation. Since then, the Dutch Remonstrant pastor Gerrit Berveling has translated the Deuterocanonical or apocryphal books, in addition to new translations of the Gospels, some of the Christian epistles, and some books of the Hebrew Bible. These have been published in various separate booklets, or serialized in Dia Regno, but the Deuterocanonical books have appeared in recent editions of the Londona Biblio.

==== Christianity ====
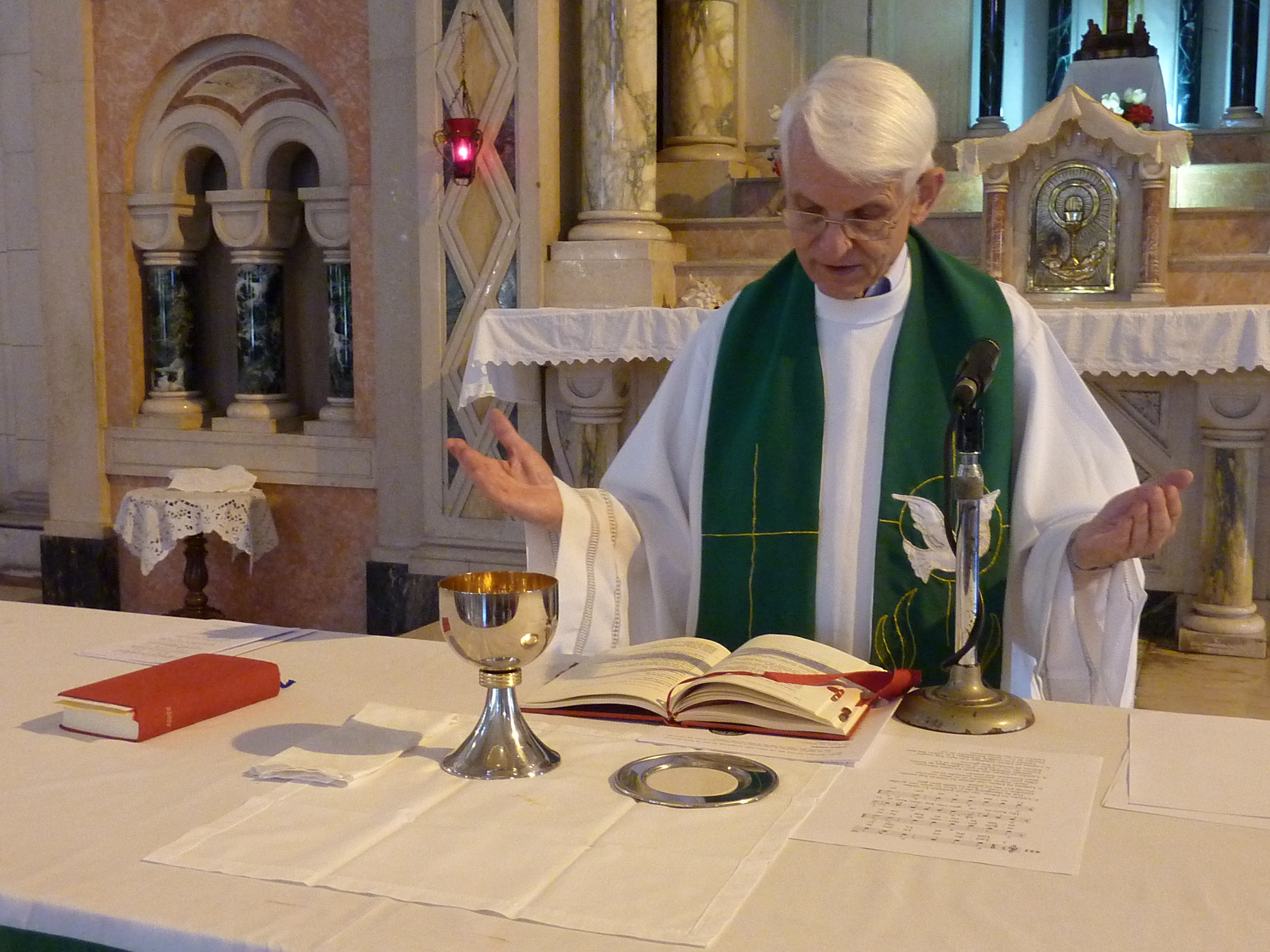
Mass in Esperanto during the 95th World Congress of Esperanto in Havana, 2010

Christian Esperanto organizations and publications include:

- After a failed attempt to start a Catholic Esperanto organization, Emile Peltier, a parish priest near Tours, France, published the first issue of Espero Katolika (Catholic Hope) in 1902. A year after Peltier's death, the International Union of Catholic Esperantists (Internacia Katolika Unuiĝo Esperantista, IKUE) was formed in 1910. Father Max Metzger founded the World Peace League of the White Cross in 1916 and the German Catholics' Peace Association in 1919, both of which used Esperanto as their working language. Two Roman Catholic popes, John Paul II and Benedict XVI, regularly used Esperanto in their multilingual Urbi et Orbi blessings at Easter and Christmas each year since Easter 1994.
- In 1911, The International League of Christian Esperantists (Kristana Esperantista Ligo Internacia, KELI) was founded during the Universal Congress of Esperanto in Antwerp. The founder, Paul Hübner (1881-1970), was an early supporter of the Nazi movement, a fact which disenfranchised liberal and Jewish members, thus severely limiting the growth of the KELI during the first half of the 20th century. KELI's bimonthly interdenominational magazine, Dia Regno, continues to be published and is reportedly made available to readers in 48 countries. They have also published several Esperanto hymnals including the 1971 Adoru Kantante (Worship by Singing) and Tero kaj Ĉielo Kantu (Earth and Heaven Sing).
- The Quaker Esperanto Society (Kvakera Esperanto-Societo, KES) was established in 1921 and described in multiple issues of "The Friend" Advices and Queries (Konsiloj kaj Demandoj) and several other Quaker texts have been translated. Well-known Esperantists who were also Quakers include authors and historians, Edmond Privat and Montagu Christie Butler.
- The first Christadelphian publications in Esperanto were published in 1910.
- The Book of Mormon has been partially translated into Esperanto, although the translation has not been officially endorsed by the Church of Jesus Christ of Latter-day Saints. There exists a group of Latter-day Saint Esperantists who distribute church literature in the language.

==== Islam ====
Ayatollah Khomeini of Iran called on Muslims to learn Esperanto and praised its use as a medium for better understanding among peoples of different religious backgrounds. After he suggested that Esperanto replace English as an international lingua franca, it began to be used in the seminaries of Qom. An Esperanto translation of the Qur'an was published by the state shortly thereafter.

== Modifications ==
Though Esperanto itself has changed little since the publication of Fundamento de Esperanto (Foundation of Esperanto), a number of reform projects have been proposed over the years, starting with Zamenhof's proposals in 1894 and Ido in 1907. Several later constructed languages, such as Universal, Saussure, Romániço, Internasia, Esperanto sen Fleksio, and Mundolingvo, were all based on Esperanto.

In modern times, conscious attempts have been made to eliminate perceived sexism in the language, such as Riism. Many words with ĥ now have alternative spellings with k and occasionally h, so that arĥitekto may also be spelled arkitekto; see Esperanto phonology for further details of ĥ replacement. Reforms aimed at altering country names have also resulted in a number of different options, either due to disputes over suffixes or Eurocentrism in naming various countries.

== Eponymous entities ==
There are some geographical and astronomical features named after Esperanto, or after its creator L. L. Zamenhof. These include Esperanto Island in Antarctica, and the asteroids 1421 Esperanto and 1462 Zamenhof discovered by Finnish astronomer and Esperantist Yrjö Väisälä.

== See also ==
- Arcaicam Esperantom
- Baza Radikaro Oficiala
- China Esperanto League
- Economics of language
- Encyclopedias in Esperanto
- Esperantic Studies Foundation
- Esperanto in China
- Esperanto library
- Esperanto movement
- Esperantology
- Global language system
- Homaranismo
- Interlingua
- International English
- Novial (Comparison with Esperanto)
- Outline of Esperanto
- Standard French
- World Esperanto Youth Organization

== Literature ==
- Lins, Ulrich (10 February 2017). Dangerous Language – Esperanto under Hitler and Stalin. Springer. ISBN 978-1-137-54917-4.
- Schor, Esther (2016). Bridge of Words: Esperanto and the Dream of a Universal Language. New York: Henry Holt and Company. ISBN 978-1-42994-341-3. LCCN 2015018907.
- Matthias, Ulrich (2002). Esperanto: The New Latin for the Church and Ecumenism. Translated by Leon, Mike; Mullarney, Maire. Antwerp: Flandra Esperanto-Ligo. ISBN 90-77066-04-7. Archived from the original on 17 September 2008.
