= Spomenka Štimec =

Croatian Esperantist (born 1949)

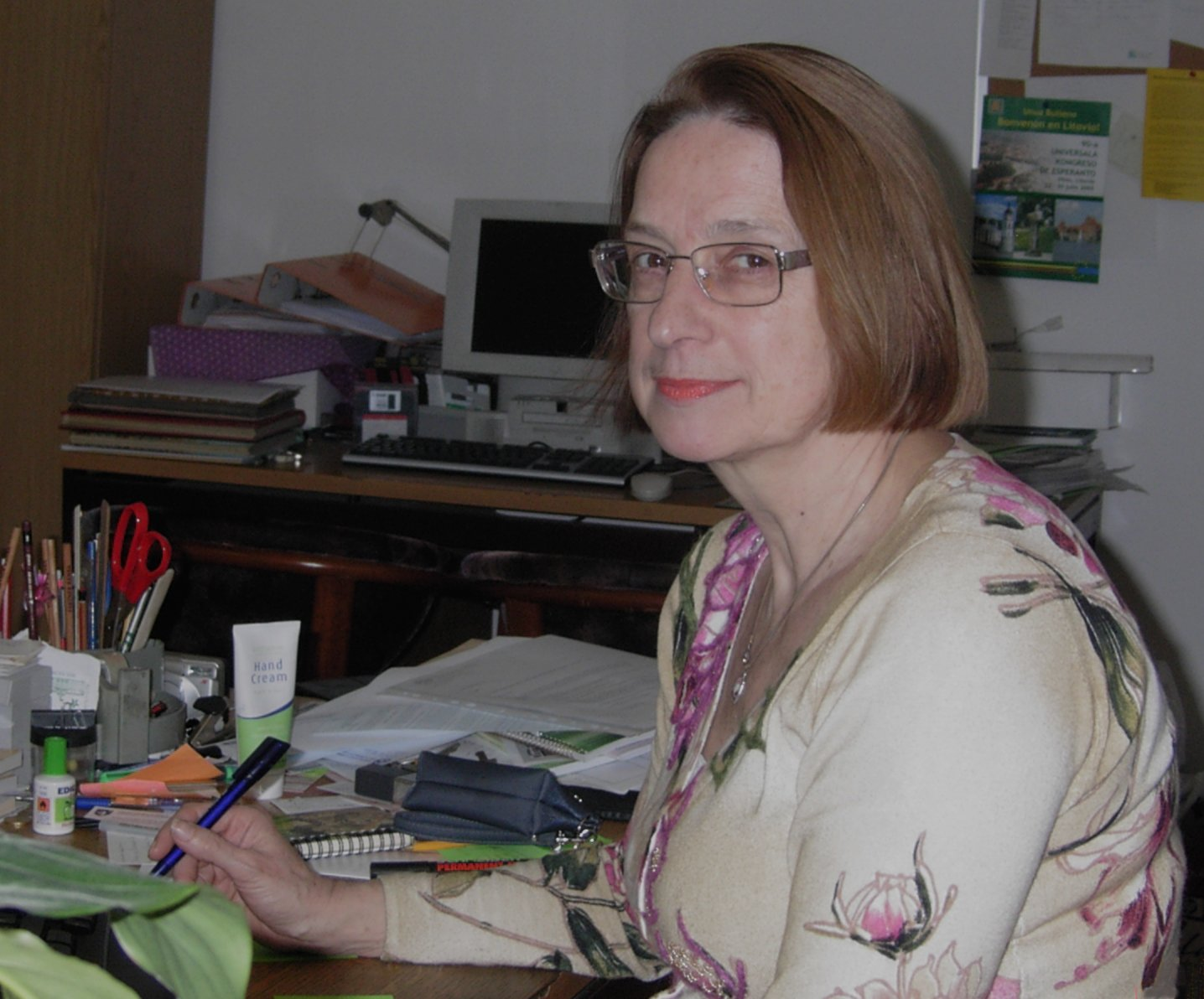
- Štimec in 2007
- Born: 4 January 1949 (age 77); Orehovica, SFR Yugoslavia (modern-day Croatia)

Spomenka Štimec (Croatian pronunciation: [spômeːŋka ʃtǐːmet͡s]; born 4 January 1949 in Orehovica) is a Croatian writer who is an acclaimed contemporary writer in Esperanto, and also significant to Esperanto in Croatia. In 1994 she shared the cultural award Alena Esperanto-Kulturpremio with the magazine Heroldo de Esperanto.
