= Han Moo-hyup =

Han Moo-hyup 한무협
- Han as Hyundai CEO
- Born: August 22, 1923; Pyongyang, Korea, Empire of Japan
- Died: August 22, 2017 (aged 94); Bundang District, Seongnam, South Korea
- Education: National Defense University; Korea Military Academy
- Occupations: Retired Major General, Republic of Korea Army; Honorary Chairman, Korea Esperanto-Asocio
- Spouse: Kim Yi-jung
- Children: 5

Korean name
- Hangul: 한무협
- Hanja: 韓武協
- RR: Han Muhyeop
- MR: Han Muhyŏp

Major-General Han Moo-hyup (Alfonso Moohyup Han, August 22, 1923 – August 22, 2017) was a Korean army general, businessman, and high-level government official of South Korea. He was the Honorary Chairman of the Korea Esperanto-Asocio, formerly major general of the Republic of Korea Army, and CEO and owner of Hyundai Insurance. Park Chung Hee, former president of South Korea, officiated at Han's wedding as an old friend.

== Personal ==
Han, as a young boy, fled North Korea alone and joined the ROK Army. After Han graduated from the prestigious Korea Military Academy in 1948, he earned a second bachelor's degree in political science and diplomacy from Dankook University (1962). He then pursued graduate study at Hanyang University (1965), Korea National Defense University, and National Defense University in Washington D.C. Han is known to have had close relationship to the former Korean president Park Chung Hee and his family. Han married Kim Yi-jung, and together they have three sons and two daughters.

He died on August 22, 2017, his 94th birthday, in Bundang District.

== Career ==
=== Military career ===
As a professional military officer, he served in various key posts, including commander of the 26th Infantry Division, director for intelligence (G-2) of the Joint Chiefs of Staff, and commander of Korea Army Training Center. Also, he worked for the Korean CIA (National Intelligence Service) as head of investigation. Later, he was offered a legislative seat by then ruling New Korea Party, but turned down the offer.

=== Business career ===
After his retirement from the ROK Army as major general, Han became a financier and headed insurance companies for over 15 years. He became the CEO and owner of Hyundai Insurance (formerly known as Dongbang Fire and Marine Insurance Co.) and later CEO of Haedong Fire & Marine Insurance (Regent Fire Insurance). As a devout Roman Catholic, Han also cofounded the Catholic Businessmen's Association of Korea in 1978 and served as deputy chairman.

=== Educational career ===
Han was named chairman of the Board of Trustees of Kumoh Foundation, which owns Kumoh National Institute of Technology and Kumoh Technical High School. He later became chairman of Korea Esperanto-Asocio (KEA) in 1978, and a member of the Board of Trustees of the University of Suwon. He was later re-elected as KEA chairman in 1991 and served for 4 years.

== La Espero ==
In 1976, Han founded "La Espero el Koreio," a public relations magazine which introduced Korean culture and literature to the world in Esperanto. In total, 123 editions were published before the discontinuance of the magazine in 1994. Han and his publication "La Espero" played a crucial role in the development of Esperanto in Korea. He served as chairman of the organizing committee of the World Congress of Esperanto, and presently he is the only Korean honorary member of the World Esperanto Association (Universala Esperanto-Asocio) and honorary chairman of KEA.

== Awards ==
- Minister of Finance Award (1978)
- Golden Chungmu Medal (Korea)
- Legion of Merit (U.S.)

== See also ==
- Park Chung Hee
- Republic of Korea Army
- Government of South Korea
- Third Republic of South Korea
- Fourth Republic of South Korea (Yushin Constitution)
- National Intelligence Service
- Republic of Korea Army
- Esperanto
