= Forskningsinstitut för Esperantologi =

- Esplora Instituto de Esperantologio
- Abbreviation: EIE
- Formation: December 8, 2025
- Type: Non-profit research and educational organisation
- Headquarters: Skandinava Esperanto-Domo
- Location: Lesjöfors, Sweden
- President: Johannes Genberg
- Honorary President: Christer Kiselman
- Website: instituto.esperantio.net/en/

Forskningsinstitut för Esperantologi (EIE; Esperanto: Esplora Instituto de Esperantologio; lit. Research Institute for Esperantology) is a Swedish research and educational institution devoted to the study of Esperanto, Esperantology and interlinguistics. Established on 8 December 2025, it operates as a non-profit association (ideell förening) under Swedish law. Its headquarters are located in Lesjöfors, Värmland County, Sweden.

The institute brings together research, academic teaching and cultural documentation concerning Esperanto and its international community.

== History ==
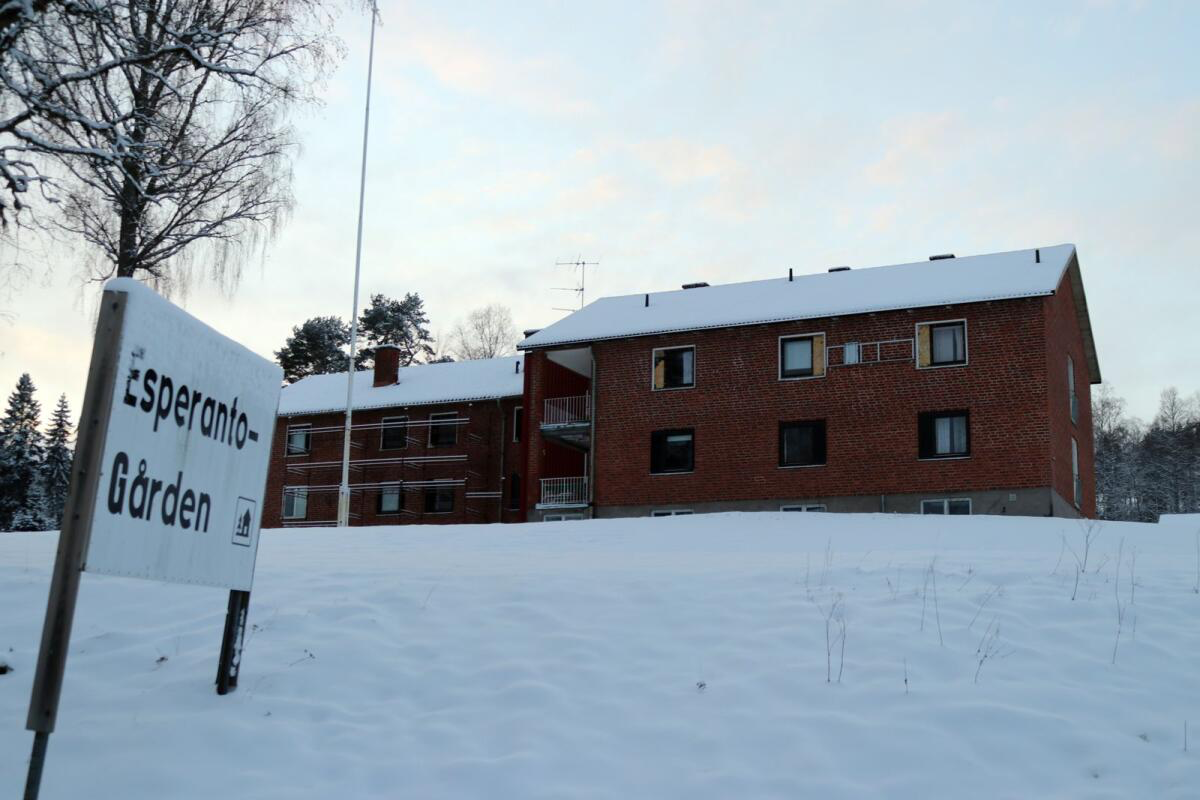
Headquarters of Forskningsinstitut för Esperantologi.

The origins of EIE can be traced to Kultura Centro Esperantista (KCE), an Esperanto cultural centre based in La Chaux-de-Fonds, Switzerland. Plans to establish a specialised institution for Esperanto studies were announced in 2021. By 2022, preliminary teaching programmes had been developed in literature, linguistics and language teaching methodology.

Teaching activities began in August 2025 with a course on Esperanto literature led by Giorgio Silfer, combining in-person instruction in Switzerland with subsequent online studies.

On 8 December 2025, the institute was formally established as an independent association in Sweden, separating its administration from Kultura Centro Esperantista. Its registered headquarters were placed at the Skandinava Esperanto-Domo, formerly known as Esperanto-Gården, in Lesjöfors.

In 2026, the institute expanded its teaching programme with a course in Esperanto linguistics led by Ilona Koutny.

== Organisation ==
EIE is governed by an Administrative Committee responsible for its institutional affairs. As of November 2026, its president is Johannes Genberg, with Giorgio Silfer serving as vice-president and Manuela Blanco as secretary-treasurer. The Swedish mathematician and Esperantologist Christer Kiselman, a former president of the Academy of Esperanto, serves as honorary president.

Academic activities are coordinated by a Faculty Council (Esperanto: Docenta Kolegio). Its members include Giacomo Comincini (history and law), Alessio Giordano (general linguistics and phonology), Ilona Koutny (linguistics), Perla Martinelli (translation studies), Giorgio Silfer (literature) and Paola Tosato (teaching methodology).

== Research and education ==
The institute's research programme covers four principal areas: Esperanto studies, planned-language studies, the history of the Esperanto community, and linguistic and literary studies. These fields encompass the development and use of Esperanto, the history of constructed languages, Esperanto literature and translation, and the social and cultural history of Esperanto speakers.

Its educational activities combine intensive in-person courses with distance learning.

The institute lists three venues for its educational activities: Skandinava Esperanto-Domo in Lesjöfors, Sweden; Helvetia Esperanto-Domo in La Chaux-de-Fonds, Switzerland; and Tanganika Esperanto-Domo in Bujumbura, Burundi.

== See also ==
- Esperantology
- Interlinguistics
- Esperanto culture
