= Peter Baláž (Esperantist) =

Slovak publisher and Esperantist (born 1979)

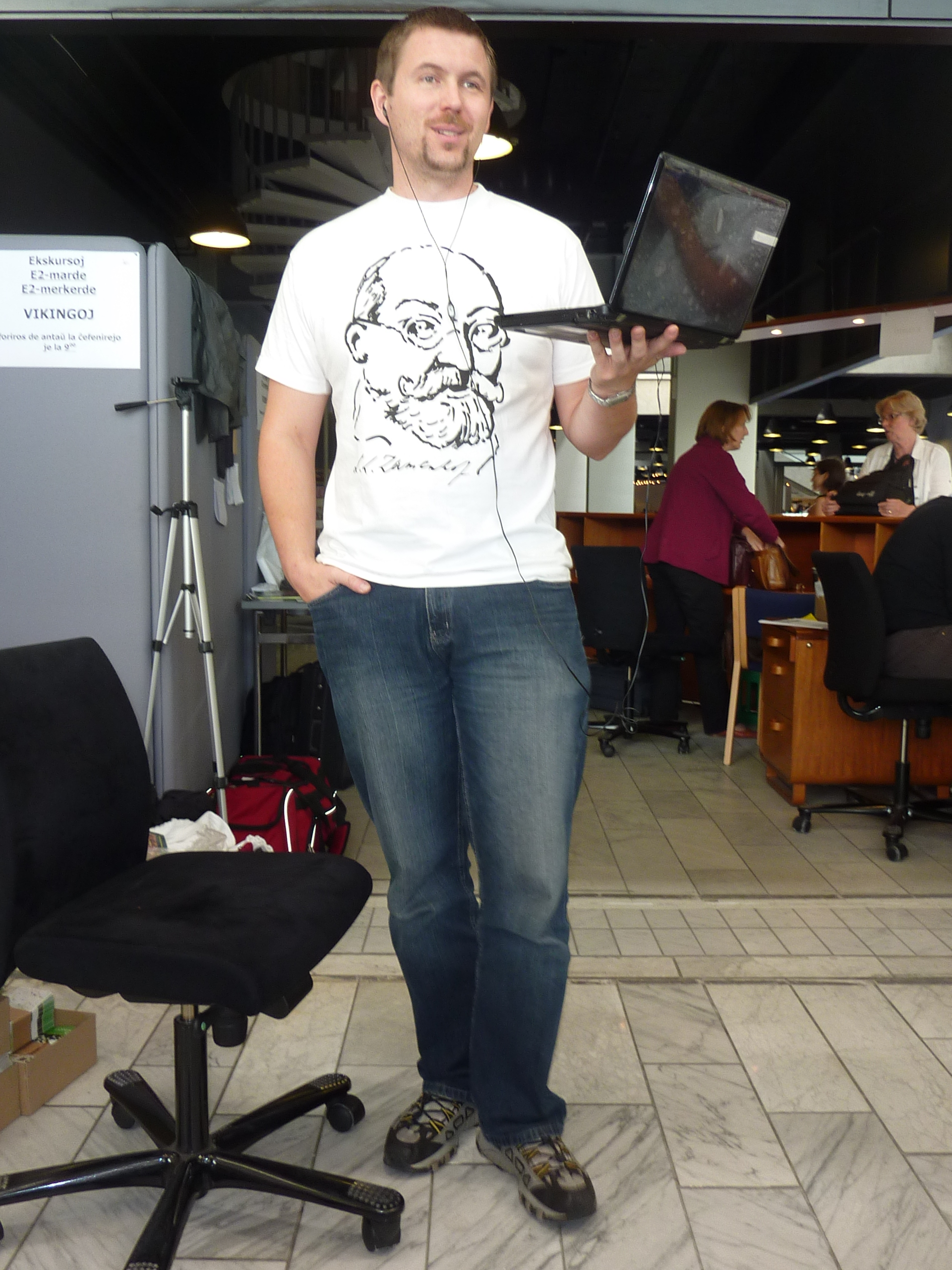
- Baláž plan the annual summer Esperanto study program using Wi-Fi Internet at the 96th World Congress of Esperanto in Copenhagen (2011).
- Born: Peter Baláž; October 8, 1979 (age 46); Partizánske, Czechoslovakia
- Occupation: editor
- Writing career
- Language: Slovak, Czech, German, Polish, Russian, English and Esperanto
- Notable awards: Esperantist of the Year, 2012
- Website: www.espero.sk

Peter Baláž (Slovak pronunciation: [ˈpɛtɛr ˈbalaːʃ]; born 8 October 1979 in Partizánske, Czechoslovakia), in Esperanto known as Petro (Esperanto pronunciation: [ˈpetro]), is an Esperantist, publisher and editor; he was selected as the 2012 Esperantist of the Year. Until 2021 Baláž lived in his hometown of Partizánske, now he lives in Nová Dubnica. He speaks Slovak, Czech, German, Polish, Russian and English, as well as the international constructed language Esperanto.

== Work ==
After pursuing a vocational program in hospitality at Hotelová Akadémia Ľudovíta Wintera ("Ľudovít Winter Hotel Academy") in Piešťany, he worked for two years in Germany and Austria.

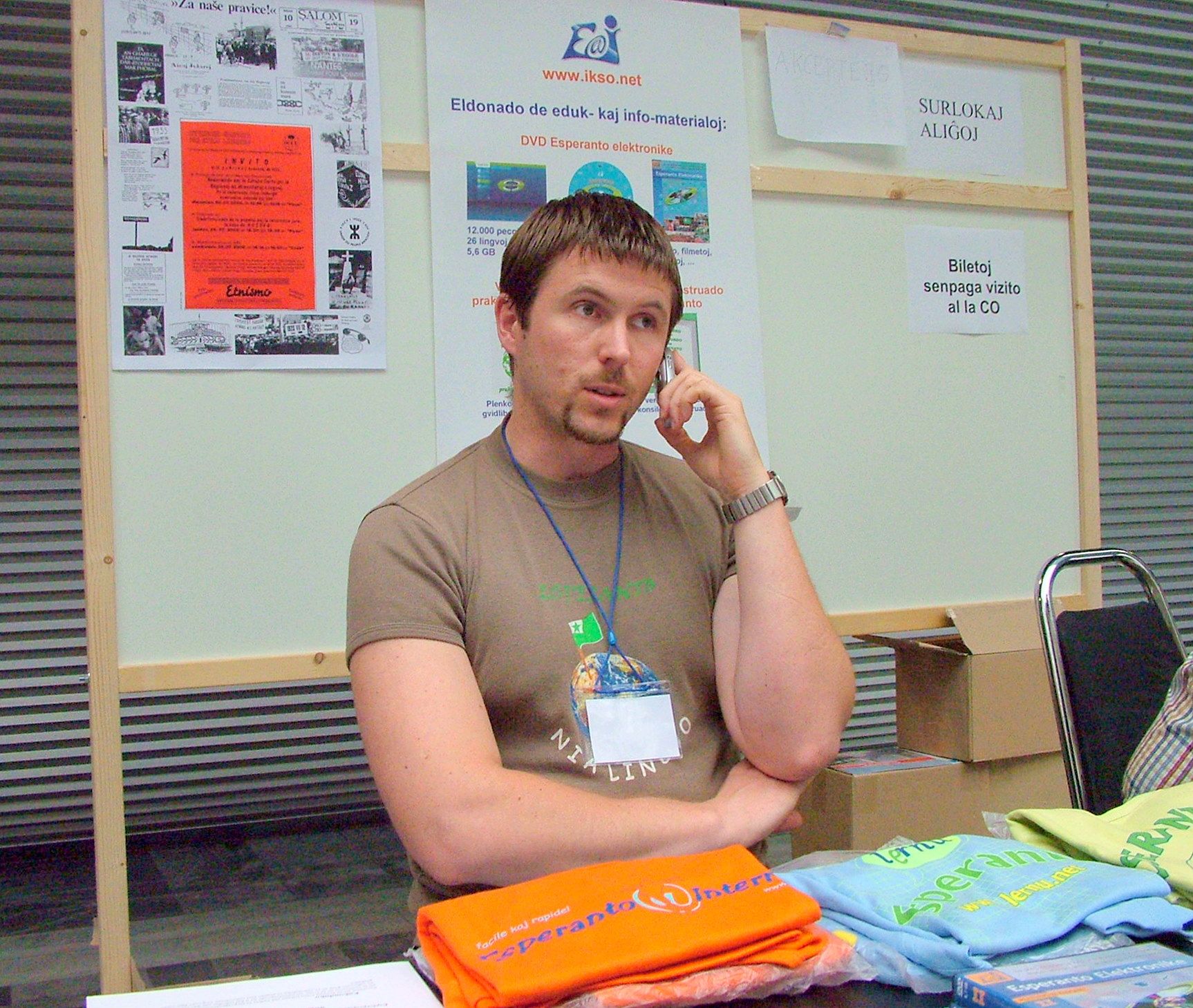
Peter Baláž at the 2008 World Congress of Esperanto in Rotterdam.

Baláž is especially active in the international Esperanto movement and educational projects. In 2003 he co-founded Slovak Esperanto Youth (Slovak: SKEJ - Slovenská esperantská mládež, Esperanto: Slovakia Esperanta Junularo) and served as its president for five years. In 2004 he was elected as vice-president of the Slovak Esperanto Federation (Slovak: Slovenská esperantská federácia, Esperanto: Slovakia Esperanta Federacio) and in 2005 became coordinator of E@I ("Education on the Internet") as well as a board member of the European Esperanto Union (Eŭropa Esperanto-Unio). He is a former board member of Wikimedia Slovakia and a former member of its Revision Committee (September 2012 – 2019). He owns the Slovakia-based publishing firm Espero, founded in 2003, which publishes Esperanto works.

=== Organising of events ===
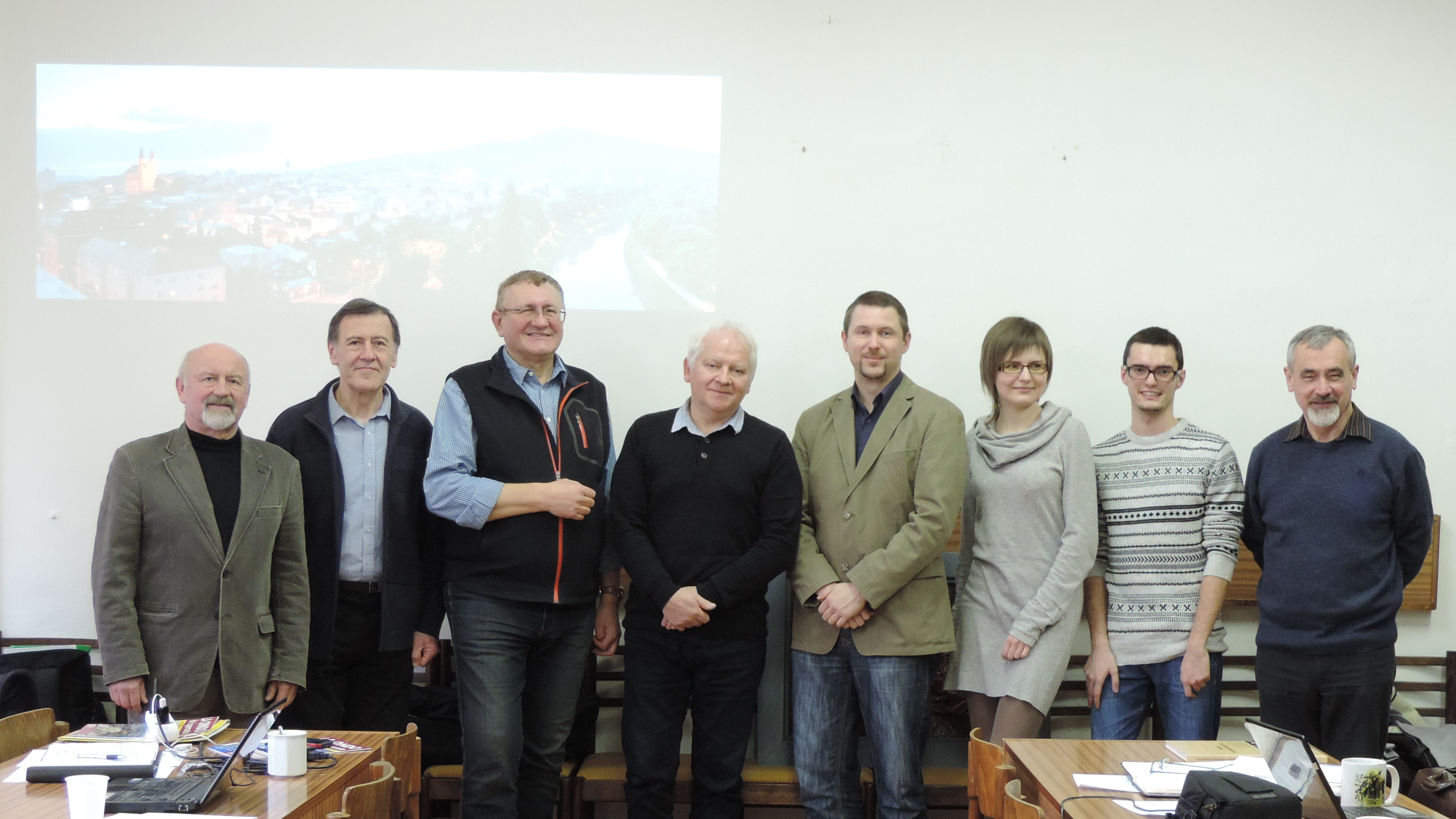
Local Congress Committee of World Congress of Esperanto 2016 (Nitra, Slovakia). Peter Baláž (fifth from left) is its president.

Peter Baláž organised and is organising a couple of events.

In 2007 he led test Esperanto summer school Slava Esperanto-Studado (Slavic Esperanto Study - SES). The original idea, in which Peter participated, was an event touring though various Slavic countries and providing to its participants courses of Esperanto language and Slavic culture. But the next year Peter changed the spirit of the event and made it a physical meeting of lernu! users. Accordingly, the organising organisations was lernu!, E@I (as provider of lernu!) and Slovak Esperanto Youth and the name was changed to Summer Esperanto Study, the abbreviation is still “SES”. Since that SES occurred every year in Slovakia and in 2014 additionally in Russia. Peter was the main organiser of all SESes.

In 2010 E@I took organisation of Conference on the Application of Esperanto in Science and Technology (KAEST) with Peter as the main organiser.

Peter is also the president of Local Congress Committee of World Congress of Esperanto 2016 (Nitra, Slovakia).

== Awards ==
Baláž was five times nominated for the international magazine La Ondo de Esperanto. In 2008 he was in second place, behind Ilony Koutny and in 2011 in third place, behind Dennis Keefe. Finally in 2012 he became a laureate himself, in recognition of his "establishment, development and care of important network projects; exemplary co-operation with national and European authorities, celebration of the Somera Esperanto-Studado (a summer Esperanto study program) and of the scientific conference Konferenco pri Aplikoj de Esperanto en Scienco kaj Tekniko (Conference on the Application of Esperanto in Science and Technology, KAEST); editing of important records, books, pamphlets and films in Esperanto." He was also cited for "succeeding at stimulating and (re)activating many talented young people, who without this might have lost interest in Esperanto."

== Works ==
- Peter Baláž. Európsky preukaz pre deti. Partizánske: Espero, 10 p. (Slovak, English, Esperanto)
- Peter Baláž. Internaciaj vortoj en Esperanto / Medzinárodné slová v Esperante ("International terminology in Esperanto"). Partizánske: Espero, 2005, 46 p. ISBN 8096904256 (Esperanto, Slovak)
