= Tekstaro de Esperanto =

Text corpus of the Esperanto language

The Tekstaro de Esperanto (Corpus of Esperanto) is a text corpus of the Esperanto language, a large collection of very diverse texts for linguistic research on Esperanto. As of January 2019, the corpus has texts with a total of 5,177,208 words. It is searchable by regular expressions, including custom search terms that are lexical (e.g., sequences of Esperanto letters) and grammatical (e.g., active participial suffixes, passive participial suffixes, adjectival suffixes, etc.).

== History ==
In 2002 the Esperantic Studies Foundation (ESF) started the project to support linguistic study of Esperanto. ESF hired Bertilo Wennergren to plan and create the first phase of the project, which finished at the end of April 2003. Wennergren was aided by Ilona Koutny, Jouko Lindstedt, Carlo Minnaja, Christopher Gledhill, and Mauro La Torre.

In 2006 planning of the Parola tekstaro de Esperanto (Speech corpus of Esperanto) was started.
