= Esperantology =

Esperantology (eo: Esperantologio) or Esperantic studies, is a scientific discipline of philology dealing with every aspect of the Esperanto language, including linguistics and literary criticism of the language and its literature, but also, for example, philosophy, didactic methods, psycholinguistics, sociolinguistics and its history, the languages derived from it and the reform projects.

Esperantology is often understood to be a sub-area of interlinguistics though it turns the attention to its artificial origins instead of its subsequent natural and culture-creating evolution. However interlinguistics remains one of the supporting disciplines of Esperanto studies, as it also examens questions of intercultural and international communication. Esperantological topics can be found in the specialist magazine Language Problems and Language Planning and in the magazine Esperantologio/Esperanto Studies.

== Principles of esperantology ==
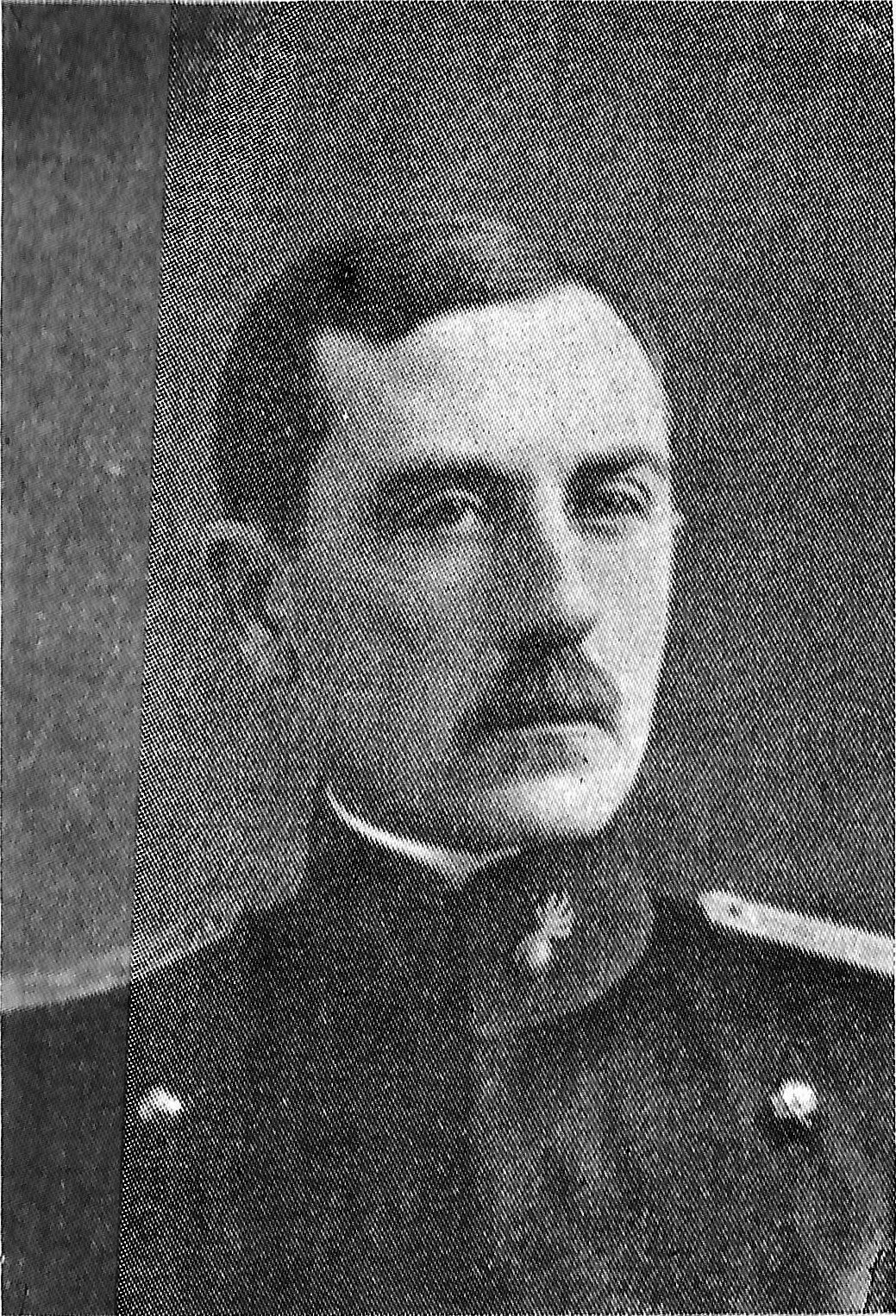
René de Saussure, Swiss linguist and founder of Esperantology as a science, and the author of the theory of word formation in Esperanto.

Esperantology principles of word construction are exemplary of the principles of necessity and sufficiency which postulate a balance between conciseness and clarity of the word. Regarding word roots, esperantology sets these principles:

- The principle of internationality
- The principle of analogy with other language elements
- The principle of the vocabulary being economical
- The principle of euphony

As it is possible to see, all these principles are not always in accordance among themselves; for example the principle of internationality asks for the word internacionala while the analogy and the dictionary being economical as for the word internacia. In the language, the second and third rule are stronger than the first one.

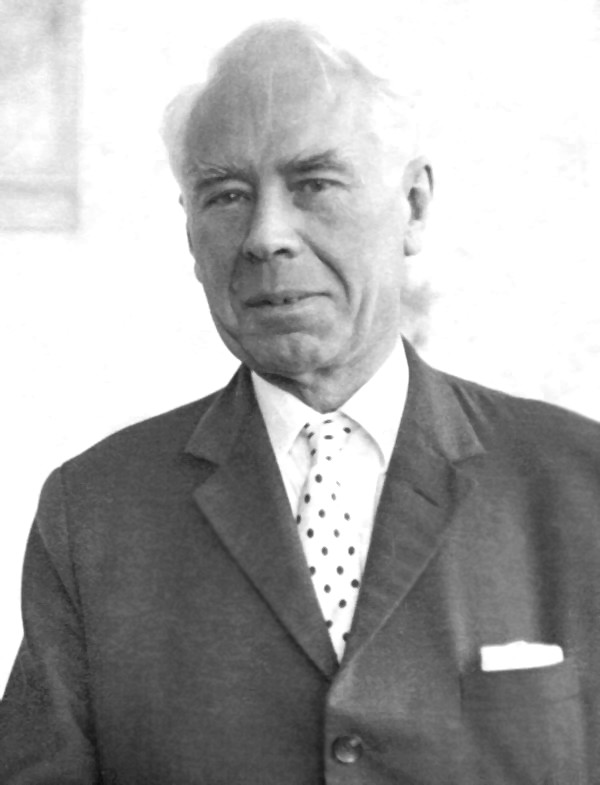
Eugen Wüster, austrian terminologist and esperantologist

Besides, the absolute validity of the above-mentioned principles also obstructs the language use, which can sanction not that correct forms and can clarify forms not clear enough.

In the publication Esperanto – Lingua Franca and Language Community (2022) there is evidence that it studies also the speakers’ use of code-switching, phraseology and metaphors, techniques employed to enhance understanding, such as meta-communication and repair strategies, as well as their predilection for humour.

== Scholars ==
Esperantic Studies Foundation assists scholars and advanced students in conducting research in the fields of language planning, interlinguistics, transnational language policy, linguistic justice, and planned languages (including Esperanto).

=== Some important scholars ===
==== Some pioneers ====
- (1859-1917) L. L. Zamenhof
- (1868-1943) René de Saussure, swiss linguist and the founder of Esperantology as a science
- (1855-1935) Louis de Beaufront
- (1884-1961) Pedro Stojan
- (1898-1977) Eugen Wüster
- (1901-1991) Gaston Waringhien
- (1904-1971) Yevgeny Bokarjov

==== 20th centrury ====
- (1909-1987) Ivo Lapenna
- (1887-1920) Hector Hodler
- (1922-2017) Hermann Ölberg
- (1924-1987) István Szerdahelyi (de.wikipedia)
- (1928-2011) Magomet Isajev
- (1933-2016) Duc Goninaz
- (1941-2016) Detlev Blanke
- (1945-2016) Reinhard Haupenthal

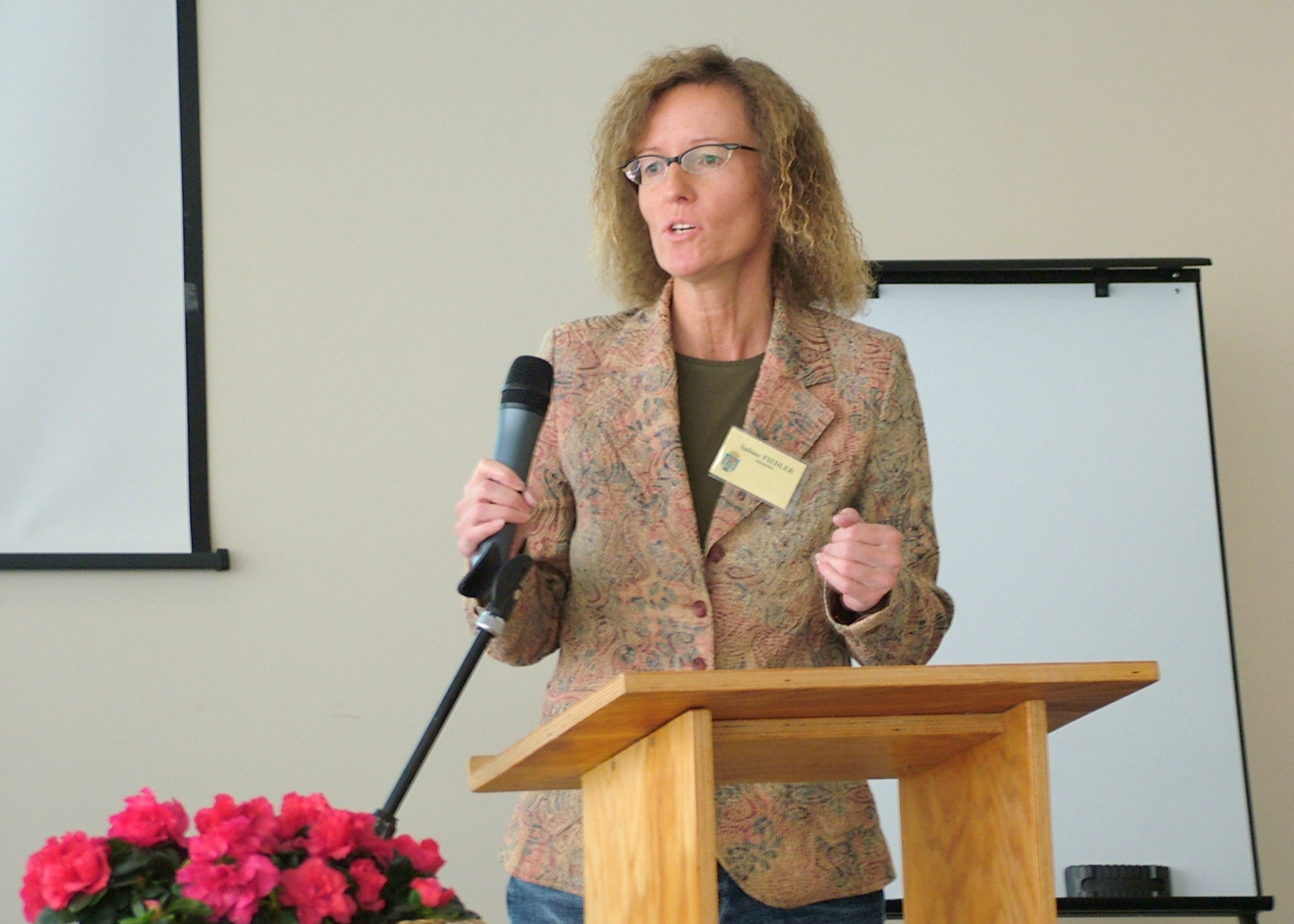
Sabine Fiedler dum simpozio ĉe UAM Poznań, Pollando.

==== Living scholars ====
- (it) Federico Gobbo (Italy-Netherlands), University of Amsterdam
- (de) Sabine Fiedler (Germany), Leipzig University
- (eo) Cyril Robert Brosch (Germany)
- Aleksandr Dulichenko (Estonia)
- Claus Killing-Günkel (Germany)
- (eo) Pierre Janton (France)
- Ilona Koutny (Hungary)
- Humphrey Tonkin (USA)
- Jonathan Pool (USA)
- John C. Wells (England, UK)
- (eo) Liu Haitao (China)
- (de) Erich-Dieter Krause (Germany)
- (ru) Sergey Kuznecov (Russia)
- Jouko Lindstedt (Finnland)
- (eo) Bernhard Pabst (Germany)
- Alicja Sakaguchi (Poland)
- William Auld (Scotland, UK)
- Bertilo Wennergren (Sweden)
- (eo) Christer Kiselman (Sweden)
- Marc van Oostendorp (Netherlands), Radboud University Nijmegen
- Wim Janssen (Netherlands), University of Amsterdam (biography in Archive).

== Reseach and documentation centres ==
- (en, eo) The Centre For Research and Documentation on World Language Problems (CED). Founded in 1952 as an institution of the UEA, CED promotes research in interlinguistics, language policy and linguistic justice through conferences, publications and support for researchers around the world.

== Libraries and archives ==
=== Libraries ===
See also Esperanto library

Three libraries hold significant amounts of material on Esperanto studies:

- The National Library of Polland is home of the Hector Hodler Library, before owned by the Universal Esperanto-Asociation, is one of the largest and oldest Esperanto libraries in the world.
- The Austrian National Library's Collection of Planned Languages is home to the world’s largest specialist library for interlinguistics, documenting around 500 planned languages in addition to Esperanto.
- Hendrik Conscience Heritage Library (Erfgoedbibliotheek H. Conscience) in Belgium has a legally preserved collection of 10,000 books and periodicals, mainly from the Foundation Cesar Vanbiervliet in Kortrijk.

=== Archives ===
- Internacia Esperanto-Arkivo (IEspa.eu) is one of the richest archives for Esperanto studies in the EU.
- Archive Interlinguisticcs - Esperantic Studies at the Esperantic Studies Foundation.

== Literature ==
- Jouko Lindstedt: Esperantologio - Esperanto Studies, 2024, https://doi.org/10.59718/EES58914, (Esperanto + abstract in english and finnish)
- (en) Sabine Fiedler & Cyril Robert Brosch, Esperanto – Lingua Franca and Language Community, Studies in World Language Problems 10, Amsterdam / Philadelphia: John Benjamins, 2022, 430 pp. (free PDF and ePub)
- Detlev Blanke (2003), Interlinguistics and Esperanto studies: Paths to the scholarly literature. Language Problems and Language Planning, 27(2), 155-192.
- (en) Detlev Blanke, International Planned Languages - Essays on Interlinguistics and Esperantology, Editors: Sabine Fiedler, Humphrey Tonkin, New York, eld. Mondial, 2018, 228 paĝoj, ISBN 978-1-59569-377-8. It is to a large extent due to the lifelong scholarly devotion of Blanke to this area of research that Interlinguistics and Esperanto Studies (Esperantology) have become serious subjects of study in the academic world.
- (de, eo) Detlev Blanke, Interlingvistiko kaj esperantologio. Bibliografio de la publikaĵoj de Detlev Blanke, Eld). Ulrich Becker, 242 paĝoj, ISBN 978-1-59569-202-3
- Detlev Blanke (2015). How not to reinvent the wheel: The essential scholarly literature in Interlinguistics and Esperantology. Interdisciplinary Description of Complex Systems, 13(2), 200-215.
- (it) Federico Gobbo (2009). Fondamenti di interlinguistica ed esperantologia: Pianificazione linguistica e lingue pianificate. Milano: Raffaello Cortina. ISBN 978-88-7043-141-4
- (fr) Sébastien Moret, Interlinguistique et espérantologie, Cahiers de l'ILSL nr. 61, Lausanne, 2019.
- (eo) Ilona Koutny, Interlingvistiko kaj Esperantologio. Poznań: Wydawnictwo Rys, 2015.
- (de) Sabine Fiedler: Plansprache und Phraseologie: empirische Untersuchungen zu reproducziertem Sprachmaterial im Esperanto . Frankfurt am Main: Peter Lang, 1999.
- (en) Alan Reed Libert, Daughters of Esperanto, München, Lincom, 2008, ISBN 978-3-89586-748-4
- (de) Pierre Janton: Einführung in die Esperantologie. Hildesheim, New York: Olms, 1993, 110 pp., ISBN 978-3-487-06541-0
- (eo) Ilona Koutny (ed.): Abunda fonto. Memorlibro omage al prof./ István Szerdahelyi. Poznań: ProDruck, 2009. ISBN 978-83-61607-32-8
- (de) Alicja Sakaguchi: Interlingvistiko: Gegenstand, Ziele, Aufgaben, Methoden. Frankfurt am Main: Peter Lang, 1998. ISBN 978-3-631-31387-9
- (eo) John C. Wells: Lingvistikaj aspektoj de Esperanto. Rotterdam: Universala Esperanto-Asocio, 1989. ISBN 978-92-9017-021-1
- (es) Giorgio Silfer, Maria Elena Ruiz Cruz, Breve historia cultural de la comunidad esperantófona, Città del Messico, Casa edotorial Grañen Porrúa, 2019, ISBN 978-607-8341-82-5
- (it) Giorgio Silfer: Se mi ne estus hebreo... Una ricerca sulle origini dell'esperanto, Milano, Centro italiano di interlinguistica, 1986
- (it) Davide Astori, "Saussure e l'Esperanto all'interno del dibattito (inter)linguistico sulle lingue internazionali ausiliarie nell' Europa di inizio sec. XX" (Ferdinand de Saussure kaj Esperanto en la debato (inter)lingvistika pri la internaciaj helplingvoj en la Eŭropo de la komenciĝanta 20-a jarcento), en Atti del Sodalizio Glottologico Milanese Vol. III n.s. (2010 [2008]), paĝoj 102-120.
- (de) Hermann Ölberg, Aufsätze zur Interlinguistik und Esperantologie, Iltis (eds), Bad Bellingen, 2015, ISBN 978-3-943341-32-4
- (eo) Helmut Welger: Germanlingva studo pri la starigo, prioritatigo kaj interagado de planlingvaj kvalitokriterioj en la verkaro de Zamenhof
- (de) Otto Jespersen, Meine Arbeit für eine internationale Sprache (Schriften zur Esperantologie und Interlinguistik); Bd. 31, Bad Bellingen, Edition Iltis, 2013, ISBN 978-3-943341-03-4
- (eo) Eugen Wüster, La terminoj “esperantologio” kaj “interlingvistiko”, In: Esperantologio, 1955 (4) pp. 209–214.
- (eo) Eugen Wüster: Esperantologiaj studoj. Antverpeno-La Laguna: Stafeto, 1978. ISBN 978-90-6336-005-4

== See also ==
- (eo.wikipedia) Esplora Instituto de Esperantologio (se: Forskningsinstitut för Esperantologi)
- Interlinguistics
- Esperanto library
