= Espo =

Espo or ESPO may refer to:

== People ==
- Stephen Powers (artist) ("Exterior Surface Painting Outreach"), a New York City artist known for graffiti
- Phil Esposito (born 1942; nicknamed "Espo"), ice hockey player
- Jesse Espo (born 1995), ice hockey player

== Other uses ==
- Espo (constructed language)
- National-Socialist Patriotic Organisation (Ethniko-Socialistiki Patriotiki Organosis), a former Greek political party
- Eastern Siberia – Pacific Ocean oil pipeline
- European Sea Ports Organisation
- Eastern Shires Purchasing Organisation, a public sector purchasing consortium in the UK

== See also ==
- Espoo, a city in Finland
- Expo (disambiguation)
