= List of language-related awards =

This list of language-related awards is an index to articles on notable awards given for language-related work.

== List ==
Region	Award	Sponsor	Awarded for
International	Esperantist of the Year	La Ondo de Esperanto	Esperanto language contributions
Europe	E. W. Beth Dissertation Prize	Association for Logic, Language and Information	Outstanding PhD theses in the fields of Logic, Language, and Information
Scandinavia	Gollegiella	Gollegiella	Promoting, developing and preserving the Sámi languages
International	Linguapax Prize	Linguapax International	Preservation of linguistic diversity, revitalization and reactivation of linguistic communities and the promotion of multilingualism
Canada	Prix Georges-Émile-Lapalme	Government of Quebec	Outstanding contribution to the quality and diffusion of the French language written or spoken in Québec
Japan	Shinmura Izuru Prize	Shinmura Izuru Foundation	Contributions to linguistics
Finland	Skolt of the Year Award	Skolt Sámi Language and Culture Association	Outstanding linguistic and cultural contributions for the good of the Skolt community
United Kingdom	Neil and Saras Smith Medal for Linguistics	British Academy	Lifetime achievement in the scholarly study of linguistics

== See also ==
- Word of the year
- Lists of awards
- List of writing awards
- List of literary awards
