= Jonathan Pool =

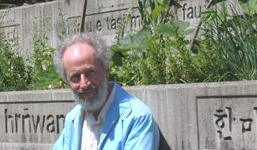
Jonathan Pool.

Jonathan Pool, born 1942 in Chicago, is a political scientist from the United States. He works on the political and economic consequences of linguistic circumstances and language policy.

Pool studied political science in Harvard between 1960 and 1964. He then joined the Peace Corps and went to Turkey, where he taught English. After his return he studied in Chicago, where he graduated in 1968 and earned his PhD in 1971.

Pool worked at the universities of Chicago, New York (Stony Brook), Washington (Seattle), Stanford as well as in Germany (Mannheim, Paderborn and Bielefeld). After 1996 he worked as a chief strategist for Centerplex, an enterprise in Tukwila, Washington, near Seattle. He now is president of Utilika Foundation.

Jonathan Pool was co-founder in 1968 of the Esperantic Studies Foundation, together with E. James Lieberman and Humphrey Tonkin.

== Linguistic justice ==
Pool has always been impressed by the degree to which peoples' first language and linguistic knowledge influence their lives. When, as a nine-year-old, he had a friend whose parents had immigrated from Brazil, he decided to learn Portuguese for reasons of fairness, while his friend learned English. While teaching English in Turkey he was surprised to find how many people got their jobs on the basis of their knowledge of languages rather than of their professional skills. This influenced the choice of his research field as in 1981 he published a paper on the measurement of the consequences of linguistic discrimination. At that time he met Reinhard Selten, with whom he worked on the application of game theory on problems of linguistic diversity. In 1991 he published a research paper proposing an economic compensation for the need to learn languages. This was an early form of the concept of a language tax by Philippe Van Parijs

== Utilika Foundation ==
Jonathan Pool established the Utilika Foundation was a Seattle-based, non-profit research entity (2004–2011) to advance communication and collaboration among diverse human and artificial agents, by means of pure and applied research. It also focused on language diversity, semantic web technologies and fostering "universal interactivity" by reducing language barriers in human-machine communication. It was involved in the development of multilingual accessibility projects.

The Utilika Foundation was also funded by ESF for research in interlinguistics and Esperantology.

== Some publications ==
- Pool, Jonathan, De LMLP al LPLP. Nova vesto por la faka revuo, Esperanto (UEA), 1977, 853 (1), p.3-4
- Reinhard Selten; Jonathan Pool 1995: Enkonduko en la teorion de lingvaj ludoj: ĉu mi lernu esperanton? Berlin: Akademia Libroservo, 1995

== See also ==
- Esperantology
- Interlinguistics
- Linguistic justice (book)
