= Esperantic Studies Foundation =

International non-profit

The Esperantic Studies Foundation, abbreviated ESF, is a non-profit organisation initiated in 1968 by Jonathan Pool, E. James Lieberman and Humphrey Tonkin. It aims to further the understanding and practice of linguistic justice in a multicultural world, with a focus on interlinguistics and the role of Esperanto. ESF's president is Humphrey Tonkin.

== Interlinguistic support fund ==
Together with the Center for Research and Documentation (CED), the foundation aims to support Esperanto and interlinguistics. The ESF invites proposals for research grants to assist scholars and graduate students in conducting and publishing research in fields such as language planning, interlinguistics, transnationalism language policy, linguistic justice, and planned languages.

ESF has funded hundreds of projects including educational websites such as lernu.net, a website to teach Esperanto and edukado.net, a website for teachers and learners of Esperanto, Tekstaro.com, a text corpus of Esperanto, Summer Esperanto Workshop in Europe (SES), North American Summer Esperanto Institute (NASK) to promote the continued study of Esperanto in the US. ESF supports the Esperanto edition of UNESCO Courier, the Conference on the Application of Esperanto in Science and Technology (KAEST), as well as postgraduate studies of interlinguistics and esperantology at Adam Mickiewicz University in Poznan, Poland and the Chair of Esperanto and Interlinguistics at the University of Amsterdam.

ESF sponsors events, including the Nitobe Symposia, a conference series on world language problems that bring together activists, academics and politicians, as well as a series of symposia on language and development aimed at raising awareness at the United Nations about the importance of language equality for human development and human rights.

ESF sponsored the documentary film The Universal Language, and produced the video course Esperanto—Pasporto al la Tuta Mondo (available on YouTube).

ESF helped establish official Esperanto examinations in accordance with the Common European Framework of Reference for Languages.

== Esperanto "Access To Language Education" Award ==
The Esperantic Studies Foundation, Lernu.net and CALICO (Computer Assisted Language Instruction Consortium), yearly present the Esperanto "Access To Language Education" Award, for the best non-commercial website offering resources for language learning.

== See also ==
- Interlinguistics
- Esperantology
