= Hermann Ölberg =

Austrian linguist

Hermann Maria Ölberg (14 October 1922 – 25 February 2017) was an Austrian linguist, Esperantologist and Albanologist.

Ölberg studied general linguistics at the University of Innsbruck from 1948 and received his doctorate in 1962 with a thesis on toponymy. In 1972 he completed his habilitation with an Albanological study of Indo-European phonology and vocabulary. Between 1975 and 1987 he was a university professor of general and applied linguistics in the capital of Tyrol.

In 2005, the University of Tirana awarded Ölberg the title of Doctor honoris causa. Ölberg died on 25 February 2017 in Innsbruck, Austria, at the age of 94.

== Albanologist ==
His valuable works were essential for the modern science of the Albanian language; thus he continued the tradition of the Austrian and German schools of Albanian cultural research and inter-Balkan relations. Since 1972 he has headed the Institute of Albanology at the University of Innsbruck, making it one of the centers of Albanology in Europe. Ölberg also organized important international conferences (e.g. in 1972 the International Albanology Colloquium in Innsbruck) and enabled young Albanian students to study and do postgraduate studies in Austria. In 2005 he was honored by the University of Tirana with an honorary doctorate.

== Esperantologist ==
Ölberg was also important in planned language research and especially for Esperanto. He learned it in 1948. For many years, starting in 1953, he ran the interlinguistics department at the University of Innsbruck, where he also established an interlinguistics library and university language courses in Esperanto and esperantology.

== Works ==
- (de) Akten des Internationalen Albanologischen Kolloquiums zum Gedächtnis an Univ.-Prof. Dr. Norbert Jokl: Innsbruck, 28.9.–3.10.1972 with Kunigunde Müller: Grundlagen der Sprachschallanalyse (Sonagraphie). Innsbruck, 1976.
- (de) Untersuchungen zum indogermanischen Wortschatz des Albanischen und zur diachronen Phonologie aufgrund des Vokalsystems (= Albanische Forschungen Nr. 35). Harrassowitz, 2013, ISBN 3-447069597.
- (de) Aufsätze zur Interlinguistik und Esperantologie, Iltis (eds), Bad Bellingen, 2015, ISBN 978-3-943341-32-4
- (eo) La lektorato Esperanto je la universitato de Innsbruck. Innsbruck 1986.
