= Jules Meysmans =

Belgian stenographer and linguist (1870-1943)

- Born: 14 May 1870; Jodoigne, Belgium
- Died: 1943 (aged 72–73)
- Occupation(s): Stenographist, linguist
- Known for: Creator of the word interlinguistics

Jules Meysmans (14 May 1870 – 1943) was a Belgian stenographer and linguist, best known for coining the term interlinguistics. Meysmans invented his own shorthand system, one of several adaptations he made of existing systems. The founder of an institute for stenography, he was active in the international auxiliary language movement, supporting various projects throughout his life, including Volapük, Esperanto, Idiom Neutral, and Occidental.

== Career ==
The "Meysmans" shorthand method

Meysmans was born on 14 May 1870 to Pierre-Charles Meysmans in Jodoigne, Belgium. His father's work as a cadastre surveyor led the family to move often. His younger brother, Léon Meysmans, would later become a socialist politician. Meysmans was educated at a Catholic school in Tienen, before gaining a teaching licence in Ghent. In 1890, he received his Doctor of Philosophy degree in humanistic studies from the University of Ghent.

The same year, he invented the "Meysmans" method of shorthand, based on the Aimé Paris system – a notice in the 1922 Communal Notices of Brussels lists the "Aimé-Paris-Meysmans" system as being capable for the transcription of French, Flemish, English, and German. Meysmans' system achieved some success, and was used by the Archdiocese of Kinshasa. In 1897, he modified Karl Friedrich Scheithauer's shorthand system, but later stopped teaching it. Meysmans was the founder of the National Institute of Stenography and Dactylography (French: Institut National de Sténographie et de Dactylographie) in Brussels, and held courses for teaching shorthand in several cities in Belgium.

== International auxiliary languages ==
Meysmans was an active member of the international language movement, supporting several throughout his life. He first joined the Volapük movement, although he left it for Esperanto in 1890, teaching courses about the language in Ghent and Brussels. In 1907, Meysmans became the leader of the Brussels-based Groupe de la Langue Internationale, an organisation that supported Idiom Neutral (a more niche language created in 1902 by Waldemar Rosenberger). A founding figure of the Neo-Romanticist school of language creation, Meysmans was particularly a proponent of Latin-based constructed languages. Indeed, Meysmans praised them in his contributions to Peano's journal Discussiones, which existed to support the Academia pro Interlingua. In 1912, he was leader of the Ventimiglia-based group Unione pro Latino Internationale; a year later, Meysmans became the chair of the Academia. Eventually, he came to support Edgar de Wahl's Occidental, and joined the Occidental-Academie's Explorative Committee for the International Auxiliary Language (Comite Explorativ del Lingue International Auxiliari) in 1929.

Meysmans was also the creator of several languages, including:

- Lingua Internationale – published in 1906, using Latino sine flexione as its base
- Idiom Neutral Modfiket (also spelled Modifiked) – published in 1909 as an altered form of Idiom Neutral
- Interlatino – published in the newspaper Revista Internationale in 1912, also based on Latino sine flexione

In 1911, Meysmans published an article entitled "Une science nouvelle" ('A New Science') in the monthly periodical Lingua Internationale, of which he was editor-in-chief. In it, Meysmans coined the term interlinguistique ('interlinguistics'), defining it as encompassing both the study of constructed international languages, but also that of natural languages as a form of trans-linguistic communication (language contact). He argued that constructed auxiliary languages could only become objects of study within the wider study of natural interlanguages, and that the use of auxiliary languages for international communication would be bounded by the same constraints as natural ones. After its creation, the term was used primarily among Idists and Occidentalists until 1931, when it was popularised by Danish linguist Otto Jespersen during a speech at the Second International Conference on Linguistics.
