= Esperantist of the Year =

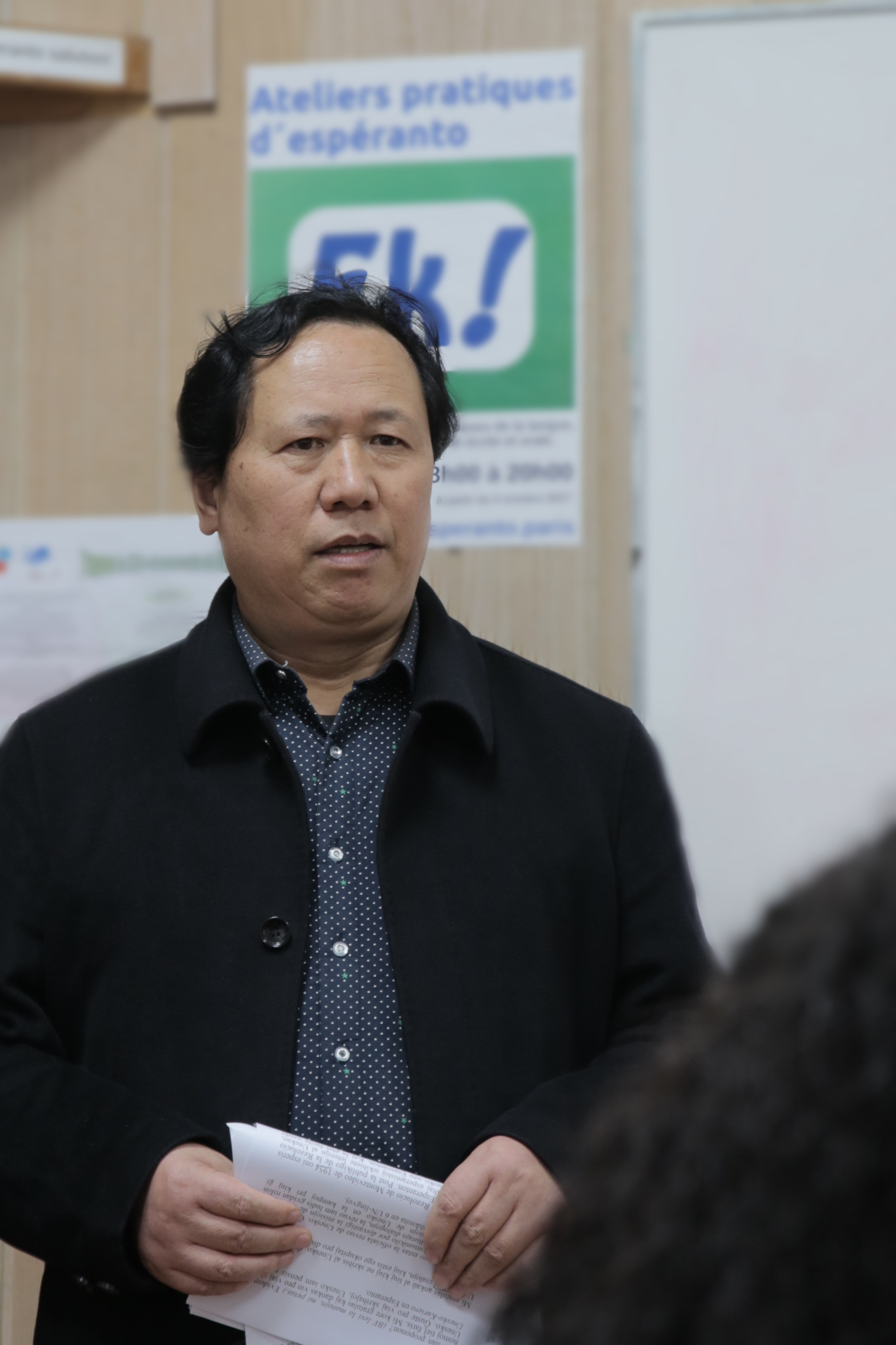
Trezoro Huang Yinbao, Esperantist of the Year 2017

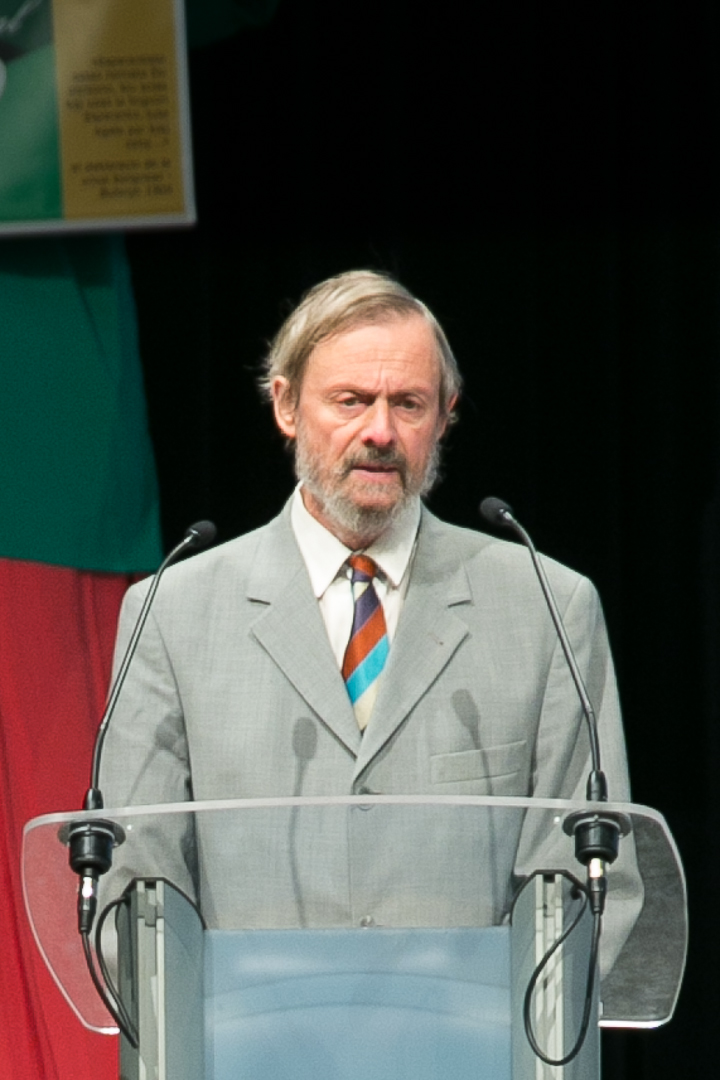
Stefan MacGill, Esperantist of the Year 2016

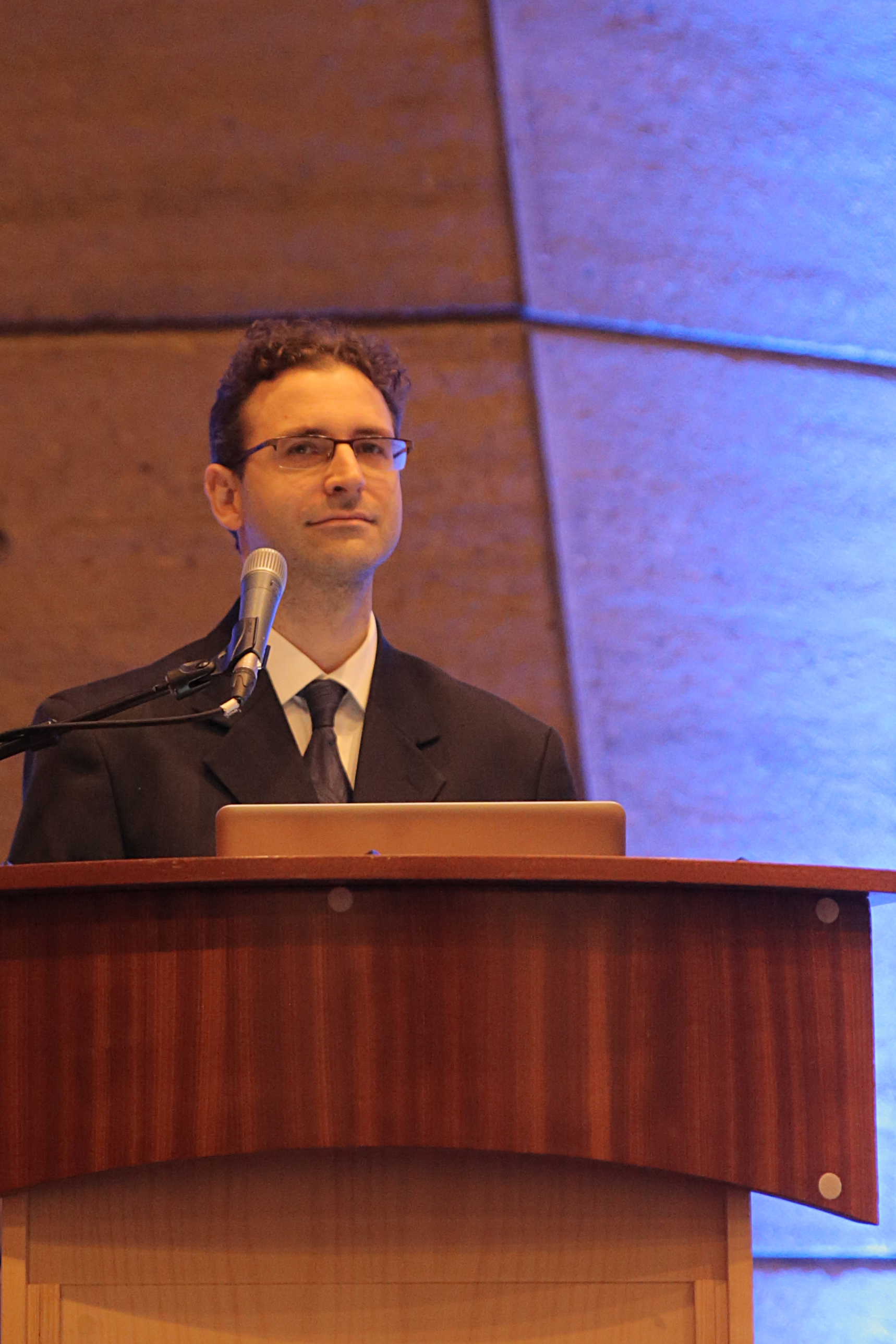
Chuck Smith, Esperantist of the Year 2015

The Esperantist of the Year (Esperantisto de la Jaro) is an honorary designation bestowed each year by the editors of the Esperanto-language monthly La Ondo de Esperanto (English: The Wave of Esperanto). The award recipient is selected by an international jury led by Halina Gorecka, the Russian publisher of the magazine.

Unlike in previous years, the award in 2025 was given based on an online vote among ordinary Esperantists.

The Esperantist of the Year award was created in 1998.

== Laureates ==
- 1998: William Auld (1924–2006), a Scottish poet and translator who wrote chiefly in Esperanto
- 1999: Kep Enderby (b. 1926 in Dubbo, Australia), former president of World Esperanto Association (UEA)
- 2000: three candidates received an equal number of votes and shared the award:
  - Hans Bakker (b. 1937 in the Netherlands)
  - Maŭro La Torre (1946–2010), an Italian specialist in computational linguistics)
  - Jouko Lindstedt (b. 1955), a Finnish professor of Slavonic studies
- 2001: Osmo Buller (b. 1950 in Taivalkoski, Finland), president of World Esperanto Association (UEA)
- 2002: Michel Duc-Goninaz (b. 1933 in Paris, now in Aix-en-Provence), for his editorship of a comprehensive Esperanto dictionary, the Nova Plena Ilustrita Vortaro de Esperanto (NPIV)
- 2003: Dafydd ab Iago (b. 1968 in Abergavenny, Wales, now living in Brussels)
- 2004: Helmar Frank (b. 1933 in Waiblingen, Germany)
- 2005: Povilas Jegorovas (b. 1955 in Joniškis, Lithuania) for his activism in Lithuania on the occasion of that year's World Congress of Esperanto in Vilnius
- 2006: Bertilo Wennergren (b. 1956 in Sweden) for his masterwork, the Plena Manlibro de Esperanta Gramatiko, an exhaustive treatment of Esperanto grammar
- 2007: Peter Zilvar (b. 1950), a German living in Herzberg am Harz
- 2008: Ilona Koutny (b. 1953 in Hungary) for her continuing competent and successful guidance of the Interlinguistic Studies department at the Adam Mickiewicz University in Poznań
- 2009: Aleksander Korzhenkov (Александр Корженков, b. 1958), a Russian living in Kaliningrad
- 2010: Katalin Kováts (b. 1957), a Hungarian living in the Netherlands
- 2011: Dennis Keefe
- 2012: Peter Baláž (b. 1979), a Slovak living in Partizánske
- 2013: Mark Fettes (b. 1961 in the United States), president of World Esperanto Association (UEA)
- 2014: Mireille Grosjean
- 2015: Chuck Smith, founder of Esperanto Wikipedia, creator of Esperanto course on Duolingo
- 2016: Stefan MacGill, retired New Zealand educator and magazine editor, now living in Hungary
- 2017: Huang Yinbao (Chinese: 黄银宝; pinyin: Huáng Yínbǎo, b. 1962 in China)
- 2018: Hori Jasuo (Japanese: 堀 泰雄, b. 1941 in Japan)
- 2019: Anna Löwenstein (b. 1951), a writer living in the United Kingdom, well-known for her literary and educational contributions for decades. This honor is a special recognition of her work creating and contributing to the new website uea.facila.org.
- 2020: Fernando Maia Jr., the vice president of the Universal Esperanto Association who oversaw the virtual congress during the Covid-19 pandemic, from Brazil
- 2021: Halina Gorecka, a writer and the publisher of the magazine La Ondo de Esperanto, from Russia
- 2022: Edmund Grimley Evans, a mathematician and computer scientist from United Kingdom
- 2023: Sun Mingxiao, a former Esperanto lecturer at the Zaozhuang University and the founder of the Esperanto museum in the same city, from China.
- 2024: Stela Besenyei-Merger (b. 1987, from Hungary)
- 2025: Ranja Zafinifotsy (b. 1996, from Madagascar)

In 2001 Osmo Buller and Claude Piron received an equal number of votes, but according to rules in effect that year, Buller was declared the winner, as more nominators had proposed his name.

== See also ==
- List of language-related awards
