= Lesjöfors =

Lesjöfors Lesjoforso (in Esperanto)
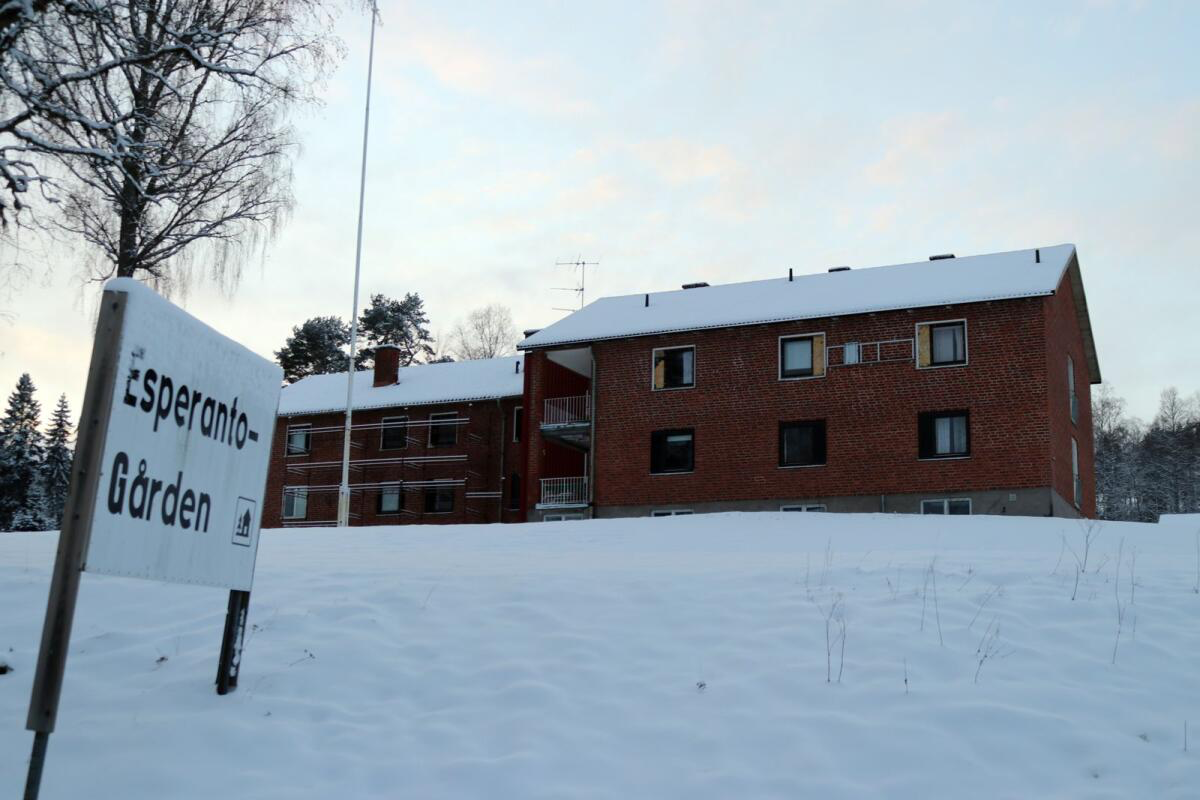
- Skandinava Esperanto-Domo in Lesjöfors

- Location within Sweden
- Coordinates: 59°59′N 14°11′E
- Country: Sweden
- Province: Värmland
- County: Värmland County
- Municipality: Filipstad Municipality

Area
  - Total: 2.45 km^{2} (0.95 sq mi)

Population (31 December 2010)
  - Total: 1,062
  - Density: 433/km^{2} (1,120/sq mi)
- Time zone: UTC+1 (CET)
  - Summer (DST): UTC+2 (CEST)
- Climate: Dfc

Lesjöfors is a locality situated in Filipstad Municipality, Värmland County, Sweden with 1,062 inhabitants in 2010.

Located in the Bergslagen area, where mining and metal preparation historically was the leading industry, the town grew up around the local industry (bruk) founded there in 1642.

Lesjöfors was the site of the International Youth Congress of Esperanto in 2003, held in a Esperanto guesthouse, formerly known as Esperanto-Gården. The building, now called Skandinava Esperanto-Domo (also Esperanto Houses in Malaga and La Chaux-de-Fonds), hosts the Forskningsinstitut för Esperantologi.

It is famous within Sweden for bandy and has produced many players for the Sweden national bandy team. It has hosted a stage of the Swedish rally.

== Gallery ==
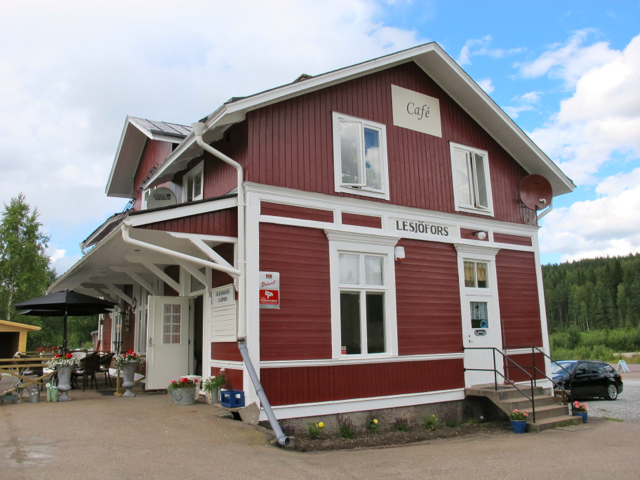
Station of Lesjöfors.

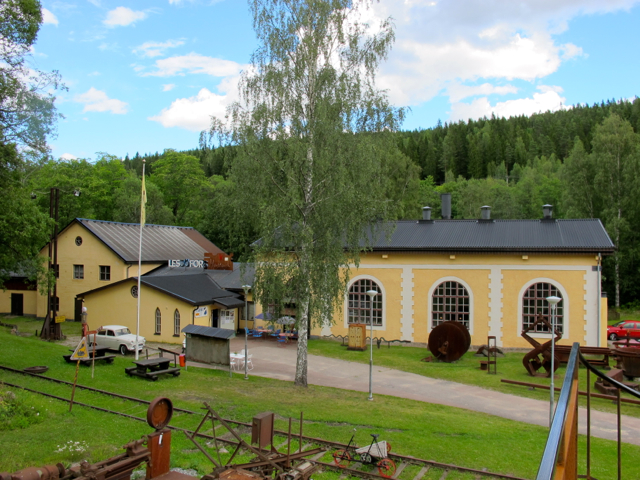
The city museum.

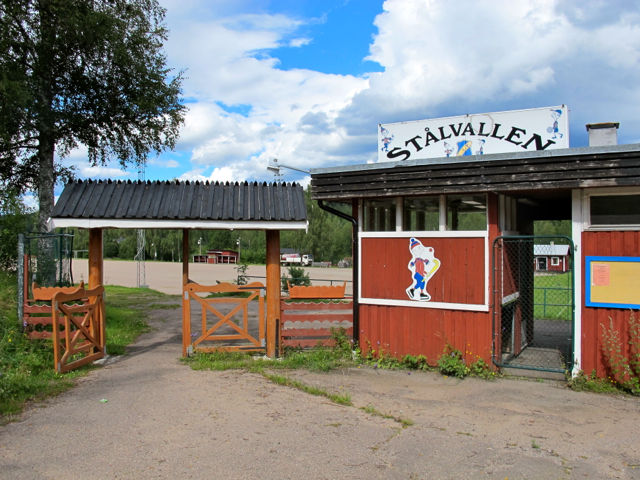
The steel mill.
