= Alicja Sakaguchi =

Polish linguist and professor

Professor Alicja Sakaguchi
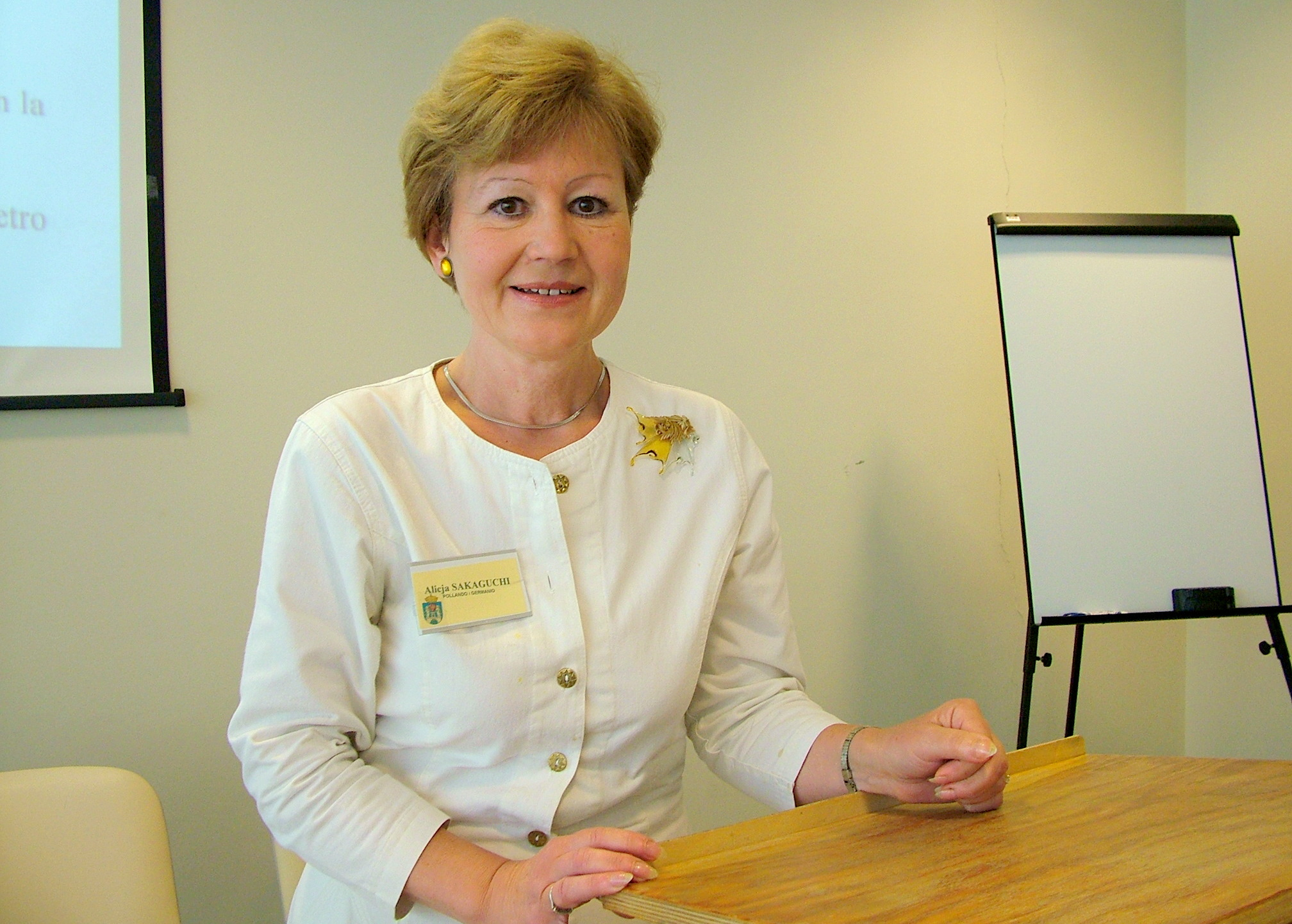
- Sakaguchi at a symposium at Adam Mickiewicz University in Poznań
- Born: 1954 (age 71–72); Szczecin
- Occupation: Linguist

Alicja Sakaguchi (née Michiewicz; born 24 March 1954 in Szczecin, Poland) is a Polish-German linguist and Esperantist. She was Professor of General Linguistics at Adam Mickiewicz University in Poznań.

== Biography ==
In 1973, Sakaguchi graduated from Maria Skłodowska-Curie High School No. 1 in Szczecin. She subsequnently studied Hungarian studies, interlinguistics and Esperanto at Eötvös Loránd University in Budapest, where she obtained an M.A. degree in 1979. In 1981, she earned her Ph.D. under the supervision of István Szerdahelyi with a dissertation entitled Modelling Linguistic Material in Foreign Language Teaching and Interlinguistics.

She has lived in Germany since 1980. From 1981 to 1985, she taught at the University of Paderborn, and from 1986 to 1998 at the Goethe University Frankfurt. In 1994, she received funding by the German Research Foundation (DFG) for the scholarly edition of Traktatu d’un Linguaź universale, an artificial language project developed in 1823 by Rasmus Kristian Rask. In 1998, she worked at the Institute of German Studies at the University of Szczecin through the TEMPUS programme.

After holding teaching positions at the universities of Paderborn and Frankfurt am Main, Sakaguchi completed her habilitation in 1999 with the thesis Interlinguistics: Subject Matter, Objectives, Tasks, and Methods.

From 2001 to 2002, she served as an adiunkt (roughly equivalent to assistant professor) at Adam Mickiewicz University in Poznań. From 2003 until her retirement in 2024, she was professor of general linguistics at the same institution. In 2010, she also lectured at the TU Darmstadt. Her teaching and research interests included interlinguistics, Esperanto studies, German, and intercultural communication.

In July 2013 the President of Poland conferred upon her the academic title of Professor (professor tytularny) .

She has given guest lectures in several European countries as well as in Israel, Japan, India, and the United States.

== Research ==
Sakaguchi’s research focuses on interlinguistics, Esperanto studies, general and applied linguistics, the language of spiritual enlightenment experiences, and the language of prophetic revelation. Several of her publications have been reviewed in scholarly journals, including her monographs Interlinguistik: Gegenstand, Ziele, Aufgaben, Methoden, 1998 (Interlinguistics: Subject Matter, Aims, Tasks, and Methods), Język – mistyka – proroctwo, 2011 (Language, Mysticism, Prophecy), and her scholary edition of Rasmus Kristian Rask’s Traktatu d’un Linguaź universal, 1996.

=== Interlinguistics and Esperanto Studies ===
Sakaguchi’s work in interlinguistics addresses the theory of constructed languages, the history and typology of international auxiliary languages, and methodological issues in interlinguistic research. Her monograph Interlinguistics: Subject Matter, Objectives, Tasks, and Methods (1998) has been described in scholarly reviews as a contribution to the systematization of interlinguistics.

Among her publications is an annotated edition of Rasmus Kristian Rask’s Traktatu d’un Linguaź universal (1996). The edition was reviewed by G. M. Verd in Archivo Teológico Granadino, by Klaus Schubert in Language Problems & Language Planning, and by Piotr Sulikowski in Colloquia Germanica Stetinensia. In his review, G. M. Verd highlighted the historical significance of Rask’s language project and praised the edition’s bilingual scholarly presentation.

=== Language and Mysticism ===
In her research on the language of mystical experience, Sakaguchi examines linguistic forms, speech acts, and presuppositions in mystical and prophetic discource. Her work combines methods of linguistics with approaches derived from depth psychology, phenomenology, and hermeneutics.

=== Text Linguistics ===
Sakaguchi has also published studies on presupposition theory. She proposed a typology distinguishing between knowledge-based and experience-based presuppositions, as well as between conviction-based and belief-based presuppositions.

=== Language Acquisition and Multilingualism ===
In the article Some remarks concerning the trilingual (Polish–Esperanto–German) development of my children (2017), she discussed aspects of multilingual language acquisition and reports observations made while raising children in a trilingual environment.

In her publication On Some Difficulties Encountered by Arabic-Speaking Learners of German: My Experiences in Integration Courses for Refugees and Migrants (2021), Sakaguchi analyzes linguistic features and learning difficulties encountered by Arabic-speaking learners of German, drawing on her teaching experience in integration courses. She discusses recurring patterns in second-language acquisition and common error phenomena.

== Selected works ==
- "Rasmus Kristian Rasks Konzeption einer Welthilfssprache" ("Rasmus Christian Rask's Concept of a Global Auxiliary Language"), [in:] Historiographia Linguistica (co-authored with Heribert Rück), 16/1989, Heft 3, pp. 311–326.
- Rasmus Kristian Rask: Traktatu d‘un Linguaź universale (Abhandlung über eine allgemeine Sprache/Traktato pri ĝenerala lingvo). (“Treatise on a Universal Auxiliary Language”). Part II of the manuscript “Optegnelser til en Pasigraphie” (1823). Edited from Rask’s literary estate, with commentary by Alicja Sakaguchi. Frankfurt am Main, Berlin, Bern et al.: Peter Lang, 1996.
- Interlinguistik: Gegenstand, Ziele, Aufgaben, Methoden ("Interlinguistics: Subject Matter, Aims, Tasks and Methods"). Frankfurt: Peter Lang, 1998 (= Duisburger Arbeiten zur Sprach- und Kulturwissenschaft 36).
- Sprechakte der mystischen Erfahrung. Eine komparative Studie zum sprachlichen Ausdruck von Offenbarung und Prophetie (“Speech Acts of Mystical Experience: A Comparative Study of the Verbal Expression of Revelation and Prophecy”). Freiburg, München: Karl Alber, 2015.
- Some remarks concerning the trilingual (Polish-Esperanto-German) development of my children, [in:] Krzysztof Nerlicki (red.): Colloquia Germanica Stetinensia. 26/2017, pp. 255–269.
- Zu einigen Schwierigkeiten arabischsprachiger Deutschlerner. Meine Erfahrungen in Integrationskursen mit Flüchtlingen und Migranten. ("On Some Difficulties Encountered by Arabic-Speaking Learners of German: My Experiences in Integration Courses for Refugees and Migrants"). Poznań: Wydawnictwo Naukowe UAM, 2021.
- Präsuppositionen zwischen Fiktion und Realität. Eine ganzheitliche Typologie (“Presuppositions between Fiction and Reality: A Holistic Typology”). Berlin: Frank & Timme, 2024.
