= Petro Stojan =

Russian esperantist, bibliographer and lexicographer

- Born: Пётр Евстафьевич Стоян; June 22, 1884; Izmail, Bessarabia (today Ukraine)
- Died: May 3, 1961 (aged 76); Nice, France
- Education: Richelieu Lyceum (today's Odesa University)
- Occupations: Esperantist, bibliographer, lexicographer

Petro Evstaf'evic Stojan (Russian: Пётр Евстафьевич Стоян, also known by the pseudonyms Ribaulb, Radovich and Šulerc) (June 22, 1884 in Izmail, Bessarabia — May 3, 1961 in Nice) was a Russian esperantist, bibliographer and lexicographer and a member of the Esperanto Language Committee (Lingva Komitato) from 1914.

== Life and work ==
Stojan studied physics and mathematics at the Richelieu Lyceum (today's Odesa University) in Odesa and in Sankt Petersburg and from 1906 to 1907 in Paris. From 1919 to 1922, he was a high school teacher in Serbia. From 1925, he worked at the Universal Esperanto Association in Geneva at its biggest work, the Bibliography of the International Language (Bibliografio de Internacia Lingvo) which was published in 1929.

He spent the end of his life in Southern France where he died of drowning.

== Engagement with Esperanto ==
He joined the Esperanto movement in 1903. According to the Encyclopedia of Esperanto of 1933, "he was one of the most competent regarding the dictionary technique." Over sixteen years, he worked on twelve dictionaries; among them are the great Russian dictionary of the Imperial Academy. His other well-known dictionaries are the Ornithological Eight-language Dictionary (1911) and the Small Russian-Esperanto dictionary and the Illustrated Dictionary of the Russian Language (760 pages and 2000 pictures). In 1929, his Bibliography of the International Language (Bibliografio de Internacia Lingvo) was published.

In 1913, he proposed the creation of the Universal Card Encyclopedia (Universala Slipa Enciklopedio, USE) which, according to his idea, could be updated by adding cards for each subject.

He also wrote a great number of scientific articles and original literature in Esperanto.

== Vindiania and Biosophy ==
In France he worked on La Vindiania, a thesis on the origin of the Indo-European languages and on a complete philosophy of life, which he named biosophy (in Esperanto - Biozofio). However, his works remained in the manuscript form and circulated among his friends, and only one book was actually published in 1946 in Arras.

== Constructed languages ==
Stojan created a number of constructed languages. As an esperantologist he created variants based on Esperanto:

- Eo (an esperantido with very short radicals, proposed in 1926 under the pseudonym Ribaulb)
- Espo (1926, a pra-form of Eo created under the pseudonym Ribaulb, which does not use the Esperanto correlatives but a naturalistic system of Ido; unpublished)

He possibly created also a number of new languages as fictional languages, simply for his amusement; but in his time, the concept did not exist. Most of which were never published.

- Amiana (an evolved form of Ariana, first presented in 1919 and its final version appeared in 1922)
- Ariana or Aryana (1912, an esperantido whose vocabulary was based on Pre-Indo-European (Aryan) radicals; pre-form of Amiana)
- Idido
- Liana
- Linga franka
- Renova
- Spiranta
- Uniala (1923, with P. J. Troost)
- Unita
- an unnamed Pan-Slavic language (1913–16, with D. Chupovsky)

== Works ==
- Puti k istine (Vojoj al vero, 1908 - du ĉapitroj pri artefaritaj lingvoj)
- Ornitologia vortaro oklingva de birdoj Eŭropaj (1911)
- Materialoj pri la Fundamento (1912, en „Oficiala Gazeto“ n-ro 41)
- Internacia transskribo de propraj nomoj (1913)
- Karmannyj russko-Esperanto slovarik (Poŝa rusa-Esperanto vortareto, 1912)
- Neobxodymyja svedenija ob esp. (Necesaj scioj pri Esperanto, 1912 - kune kun Nežinskij)
- Dopolnenie k esp. russkomu slovarju (Addendum to Esperanto-Russian Dictionary, 1913)
- Slavjanstvo i Esperanto (Slavaro kaj Esperanto, 1914)
- Esperanto pered sudom profesora (Esperanto in front of a teachers'tribunal, 1914)
- Jazykoznanie i Esperanto (Lingvistiko kaj Esperanto, 1914)
- Vojagxaj notoj (1915–1916, in „La Ondo de Esperanto“)
- Lingvaj studoj (1920–1926, in „Esperanto“)
- Cent libroj esperantaj (1923)
- Pri la evoluo de Esperanto (1925, „Progreso“, Prago)
- Principoj de Esperanto (1926, en „Kataluna Esperantisto“)
- Historio de Esperanto, kritikaj notoj (Progreso, Prago, 1926 - sub „Ribaulb“)
- Enkonduko al la fonetiko (1926, en „Esperanto“)
- Katalogo de lingvoj naturaj, popolaj, literaturaj, klasikaj & artefaritaj (1927)
- Esperantismo, kongresoj, pioniroj, literaturo, versfarado, fakvortaro, gazetaro (1927, en jarlibro de UEA)
- Rememorajxoj pri la unuaj tempoj de Esp. (Progreso, Prago, 1927)
- Nia literaturo, versfarado, fakvortaro, gazetaro (1927, en jarlibro de UEA)
- Kiel farigxis nia movado (1928, en jarlibro de UEA)
- Deveno kaj vivo de la lingvo Esperanto (1929)
- Bibliografio de Internacia Lingvo (1929)
- Vindiana berceau de nos aïeuxx" (Vindiano lulilo de niaj prapatroj, 1946)
- Al geozofio per abicelo (1954)
- Vindoj kaj dagoj (1991 - posthumous)

== Translations ==
- Abusgus, M.: Kraljevicx Marko (1897)
- Jiddu Kishnamurti: Sperto kaj konduto (1932)

== Literature ==
- Golden, Bernard (1981). Petro Stojan: Malesperantisto. In: Literatura Foiro 12a jaro 1981, n-ro 70 (Dec.), p. 13-17
- Golden, Bernard (1982). La plumnomoj de Petro Stojan. In: Dia Regno 1982:1-2 (Jan.-Feb.), p. 2384
- Golden, Bernard (1986). Bibliografiaj donitaĵoj rilate verkojn pri Petro Stojan. In: Informilo por Interlingvistoj 1986:11, p. 1-4
