= Jesse Espo =

Finnish professional ice hockey player

- Born: 5 September 1995 (age 30) Kotka, Finland
- Height: 180 cm (5 ft 11 in)
- Weight: 85 kg (187 lb; 13 st 5 lb)
- Position: Left wing
- Shot: Left
- Played for: KooKoo; JHT Kalajoki
- NHL draft: Undrafted
- Playing career: 2016–2018

Jesse Espo (born 5 September 1995) is a Finnish professional ice hockey player who played for JHT Kalajoki in Finnish Suomi-Sarja. He also played for KooKoo in the Finnish Liiga.

His brother Jere plays in same team.
