= Jouko Lindstedt =

Finnish linguist

- Born: July 15, 1955 (age 71); Finland
- Occupation: Linguist
- Awards: Esperantist of the Year (2000)

Academic background
- Education: University of Helsinki

Academic work
- Discipline: Slavonic philology
- Institutions: University of Helsinki
- Notable works: Research on Slavic aspect and language typology

Jouko Lindstedt (born 15 July 1955) is a Finnish linguist and a professor at the University of Helsinki. Lindstedt is a member of the Academy of Esperanto and was nominated as the Esperantist of the Year in 2000 (with Hans Bakker and Mauro La Torre ) by The Wave of Esperanto.

== History ==
Lindstedt received his Bachelor of Arts in 1981, Licentiate of Philosophy 1983 and Doctor of Philosophy 1985 (Slavonic Philology) at the University of Helsinki. In 1986 became a professor of Slavonic Philology at the same university.

=== The number of Esperanto speakers ===
In 1996 Jouko Lindstedt estimated the number of speakers of Esperanto, saying:

- 1 000 have Esperanto as a native language.
- 10 000 speak it fluently, as if natively.
- 100 000 can use Esperanto for effective communication.
- 1 000 000 know the elements of it.

Lindstedt explains that these are very imprecise figures; they mean, for example, that "if it is estimated the number of native Esperanto speakers only in hundreds, it may be too little, but there is not many thousands of them." According to feedback from Lindstedt, Edmund Grimley Evans has modified the scheme by adding

- 10 000 000 have at some time studied Esperanto a little ^{[1]}.

== Bibliography ==
- On the Semantics of Tense and Aspect in Bulgarian (1985). University of Helsinki, Department of Slavonic Languages. ISBN 9789514535703. Reviews:
- "Nasal vowels in the Cyrillo-Methodian language and in dialects of Southeast Macedonia" (1988). Studia Slavica Finlandensia, no. 5, pp. 69–86
- "Linguistic Balkanization: Contact-Induced Change By Mutual Reinforcement" (2000). in Languages in Contact, Brill, ISBN 9789004488472
- "Is there a Balkan verb system?" (2002). Balkanistica, vol. 15, pp. 323–336
- "Native Esperanto as a test case for natural language" (2006). SKY Journal of Linguistics 19. 47-55.
- The Konikovo Gospel/Кониковско евангелие: Bibl. Patr. Alex. 268 (2008). Jouko Lindstedt, Ljudmil Spasov, and Juhani Nuorluoto (eds.). Helsinki. Societas Scientiarum Fennica. ISBN 9789516533660
- "Esperanto - an East European contact language?" (2009). in Die Europäizität der Slawia oder die Slawizität Europas, ISBN 9783866880658
- Itä-Eurooppa matkalla länteen: itäisen Keski-Euroopan, Baltian ja Balkanin historiaa ja politiikkaa (2011). Gaudeamus. ISBN 9789524952149
- "When in the Balkans, Do as the Romans Do : —Or Why the Present is the Wrong Key to the Past" (2012). Balkan Encounters: Old and New Identities in South-Eastern Europe. Slavica Helsingiensia, vol. 41, University of Helsinki, Department of Modern Languages, pp. 107–123
- "Multilingualism in the Central Balkans in late Ottoman times" (2016). in In search of the center and periphery: Linguistic attitudes, minorities, and landscapes in the Central Balkans. Slavica Helsingiensia, vol. 49, University of Helsinki, Department of Modern Languages, Helsinki, pp. 51–67
- "Conflicting Nationalist Discourses in the Balkan Slavic Language Area" (2016). in The Palgrave Handbook of Slavic Languages, Identities and Borders. Palgrave Macmillan London, ISBN 978-1-137-34838-8, pp. 429–447
- "Diachronic regularities explaining the tendency towards explicit analytic marking in Balkan syntax" (2018). in Balkan Syntax and (Universal) Principles of Grammar. De Gruyter Mouton, ISBN 978-3-11-039337-8. doi:10.1515/9783110375930-005
- Izide slovo se. Johdatus muinaiskirkkoslaaviin ja slaavien varhaiseen kieli- ja kulttuurihistoriaan (2020). University of Helsinki, Department of Languages. ISBN 9789515150127
