= Osmo Buller =

Finnish Esperantist (born 1950)

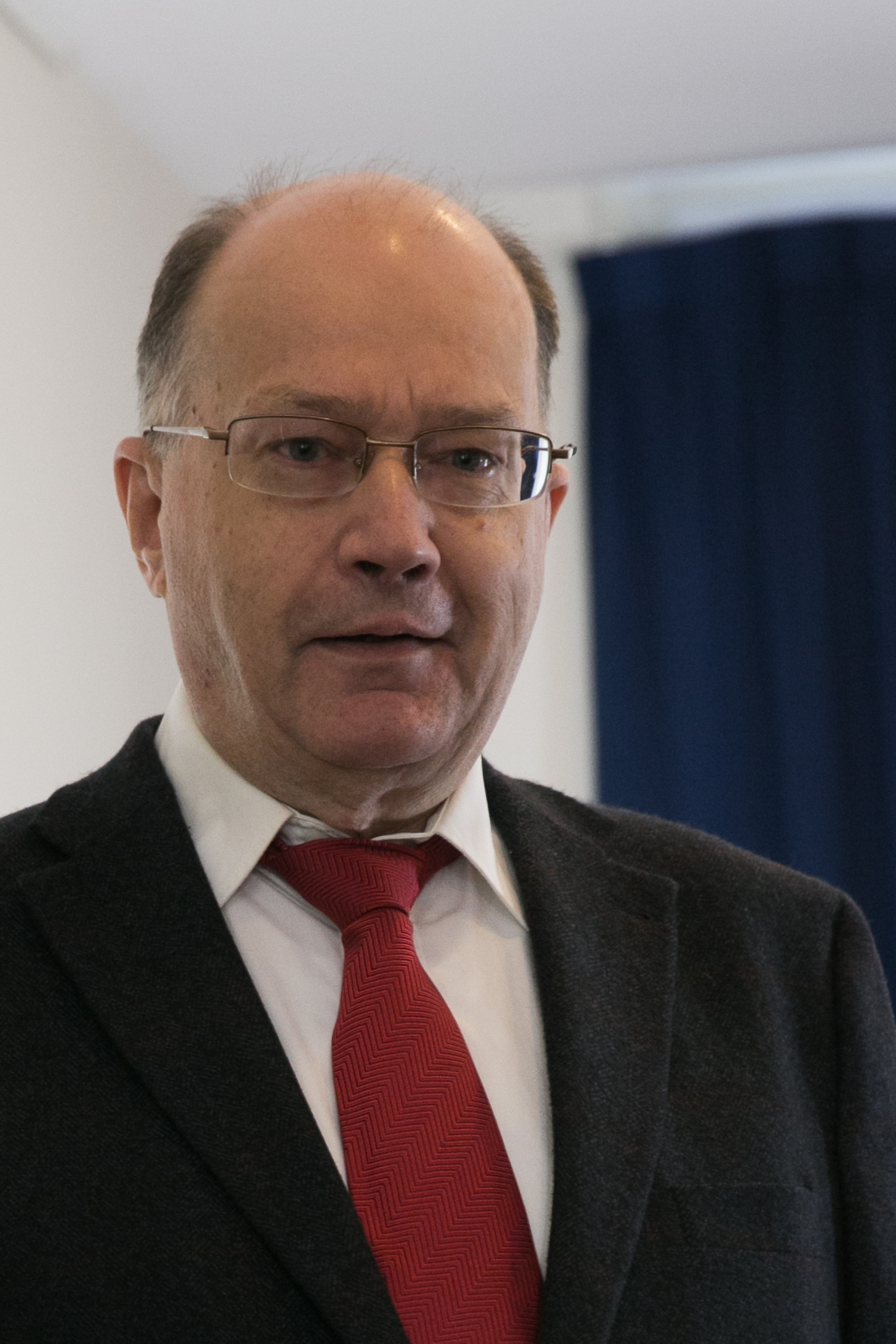
- Osmo Buller at the UEA Headquarters Open House in Rotterdam, 2016
- Born: 1950 (age 75–76); Taivalkoski, Oulu, Finland
- Organization: Universal Esperanto Association
- Political party: Esperantist

Osmo Buller is a Finnish Esperantist (born 1950) is the General Director of the Universal Esperanto Association.

Having been an active participant at the 1969 World Congress of Esperanto (Universala Kongreso de Esperanto), he began a career with the Finnish Esperanto Association. In 1985 he first began working in the World Esperanto Association Central Office. He became board secretary to the Estraro (UEA steering committee) in 1989 but resigned in 1990 to become director of the Central Office.

Subsequent to his period of directorship he became UEA general secretary in 1996. In protest at the election of Renato Corsetti as UEA president, he resigned his office in 2001 but returned in 2004. He was named Esperantist of the Year in 2001.
