= Multilingualism and globalization =

Relationship between multilingualism & globalization

Globalization has had major effects on the spread and ascribed value of multilingualism. Multilingualism is considered the use of more than one language by an individual or community of speakers. Globalization is commonly defined as the international movement toward economic, trade, technological, and communications integration and concerns itself with interdependence and interconnectedness. As a result of the interconnectedness brought on by globalization, languages are being transferred between communities, cultures, and economies at an increasingly fast pace. Therefore, though globalization is widely seen as an economic process, it has resulted in linguistic shifts on a global scale, including the recategorization of privileged languages, the commodification of multilingualism, the Englishization of the globalized workplace, and varied experiences of multilingualism along gendered lines.

== Language Contact, Categories, and Powers ==
Multilingualism is considered a form of language contact. This contact occurs when language communities, through obligation or choice, come in contact with one another. Multilingualism is therefore considered both a tool and a symptom of forces that necessitate or encourage contact between communities. Globalization is one of those forces.

Researchers accept that there are multiple categories of language, even as they often disagree on the explicit number of those categories. De Swaan's analysis of the world language system, which is arguably the most common analysis, distinguishes between five different types of languages, one of which is "English as global lingua franca." English is “hypercentral” to globalization as a result of both its common international use and its “highly prized” nature. Because English serves as lingua franca in so many international contexts (tourism, business, academia, science, etc.), most linguists place it outside the categories of majority language or minority language even if, functionally, it could be either one. These language categories create hierarchies of power in a globalized system in which minority language speakers who also speak a majority language are afforded more access and privilege than those who only speak only a minority language. Outside of contexts in which English is a national (and thus majority) language, those who are multilingual in English and another language are offered even more access and privilege in global society. For that reason, South Korea and China have been made a tremendous investments on their English language education. It is reported by Statistics Korea and the Korean Ministry of Education that South Korea has invested more than 30% of the $15 billion private education cost in the English language training. Moreover, based on the Ambient Insight's report, there are more than 50,000 privately operated English language institutes established in China. Furthermore, economically, being a bilingual who are able to use English and another language is worth generating no less than $128,000 during a 40-year period of economic activity.

== Multilingualism as Global Capital ==
French sociologist Pierre Bourdieu views language, and more specifically multilingual skills, as a form of social and symbolic capital that follows speakers as they search for work and power both locally and transnationally. Bourdieu's views have been highly influential in study of language and power. He posits that by transforming social and symbolic capital into economic capital, the multilingual is at an advantage. In short, language is commodified for use in globalized society. As a result, multilinguals may have labor market advantages over monolinguals in their ability to work with global customers. Studies demonstrate that multilingualism is positively correlated with higher salaries and gross domestic production (GDP). One study out of Switzerland suggests that Switzerland's GDP is augmented by multilingualism by 10%. According to the study by Wharton and LECG Europe, acquiring another language has the effect of increasing one's annual salary by approximately 2%. In addition, American military personnel could potentially make up to $1,000 per month if they have a good command of foreign languages, according to Money magazine. Furthermore, recent researches have demonstrated that the brains of people who can speak a variety of languages are superior than those of people who speak only one language and have a significantly lower risk of developing Alzheimer's and other types of dementia diseases. This health benefits would contribute to a long-term economic gain in the global market as it enables them to perform better and work longer at their workplace.

This is not, however, the only way that multilingualism is commodified; multilingualism, especially that which is inclusive of English, is also commodified in elementary and secondary education, adult education, government, the military, and elsewhere in society. This bears out in the higher salaries offered to multilingual workers as well as in the global push for language education.

== Englishization and English Imperialism ==
Englishization is the use of English as global lingua franca whereby English replaces the local language as a means of communication, especially in organizations, in an attempt to compete economically in a globalized society. Englishization is treated largely as a necessity in business, testament by the rise in English multilingualism as a work requirement in an increasing number of industries, regions, and organizations and by the rise in English as a Foreign Language programs beginning in the 1990s. In Qatar, for example, there is an English-language nursing program aimed at foreign workers who wish to enter the medical field in Qatar. In addition, when applying for a job in South Korea, most local conglomerates like Samsung, LG, CJ, SK, and Doosan require the scores of the Test of English for International Communication (TOEIC), an English language exam that measures fluency in English of those who use English as their second language and need to use English in their workplace.

While programs offering English language skills have broadened access to English internationally, they have been criticized for promoting linguistic imperialism, a phenomenon that entails the transfer of a dominant language to minority language speakers as a result of hegemonic and economic power structures. Robert Phillipson popularized the term linguistic imperialism in 1992 and situated the concept of English spread inside economic and political terrain. Typically, linguistic imperialism first increases multilingualism as speakers add the majority language to their knowledge base. Later, as the majority language demonstrates its ongoing use as capital, many speakers cease using their minority language. The consequences of linguistic imperialism include linguicide, bilingual subtraction, and linguistic devaluation.

The spread of English multilingualism is not isolated to the somewhat recent confines of globalization, but has a long colonial history as well. Suhanthie Motha argues that centuries of widespread colonial domination, exploitation, and deliberate English spread have led to modern-day epistemologies about empire and language value. While globalization has furthered these, they were not absent before.

== Technology and English Multilingualism ==
Shifts in technology associated with globalization have also had an impact on multilingualism and on majority language use generally. Since the 1990s, the widespread use of the internet, and later of smart devices, has expanded the necessity of both receptive language skills like reading and listening and English multilingualism. As evidence to support this, English was the very first language that was used on the internet and more than two-thirds of the information on the internet consisted of English by the mid-90s.

== Gender ==
Gender and multilingualism were first researched together in the early 1970s with the emergence of language and gender studies. Early studies in the field of language and gender examined how gender affected access to the types of jobs that encouraged multilingualism. Those studies found men more likely to hold agricultural and production-based positions that valued and offered opportunities for multilingualism. As a result, higher percentages of men developed multilingual proficiencies, isolating women from access to certain jobs as a result of their monolingualism.

The manner in which multilingualism is transferred to economic capital through globalization is also gendered. Studies demonstrate that women are less successful in transforming linguistic capital to economic capital than their male counterparts. In a study of Swiss multilinguals, for example, researchers demonstrated that women see little difference in income based on proficiency levels above “basic,” whereas men continue to gain economic benefit from incremental gains between “basic” and “fluent.”

As the field of language and gender expanded in the 1990s, scholars began rejecting essentialist notions of language and gender in favor of exploring them as aspects of social identity. Around this time, researchers also began exploring the cultural underpinnings of language and gender in the workplace, identifying links between the ways in which minority women in particular related their undesirable social location to their use of a minority language. Studies of minority-speaking women in both Austria and France suggest that women are more likely to shift toward the use of majority languages in the hopes of improving their economic and social prospects. Bourdieu calls this a “misrecognition” of language as the cause of oppression by which women associate a shift in language as a means of liberation when language was not their oppressor to begin with.

== Education ==
As globalization has progressed rapidly, the dissemination of education on multilingualism has also gradually expanded. Japan is one of the states that realized the importance of the education. Japan's renowned Universities, with the government's active support, are increasingly accepting more international students and professors, publicizing foreign language education programs, and sending more students abroad through their study abroad programs. For instance, Waseda University, one of the most prestigious private institution in Japan, is ranked as a top university in Japan for study abroad as it accepted 7,476 international students and sent 4,439 Japanese students abroad in 2017–2018. The university also teaches 28 foreign languages offering 1,541 language courses. In addition, South Korea is known as one of the countries that sends a large number of domestic students abroad, being ranked fourth in the world. It was estimated by UNESCO's research in 2014 that in the country of 50 million people, there were 116,942 students pursued studying abroad. It is known that the countries where Korean students prefer to study abroad are the United States, Japan, Australia, the United Kingdom, and Canada. Moreover, based on the 2019 Open Doors' research, as of 2019, the total number of international students currently studying in the United States was reported to be 1,095,299. It was also reported that 341,751 American students participated in the Education Abroad Program in 2018. Among many destinations, Europe was the most popular among American students and more than half of the Education Abroad Program students were sent to European countries in 2018. USA Study Abroad, a federal agency promoting the country's study abroad, has been encouraging 550 domestic students every year to go abroad and acquire foreign languages that would benefit the country's economy and security through their program called the Critical Language Scholarship (CLS).

== Growing demand of Multilingualism ==
The past and current world state is continuously becoming less and less homogeneous on a number of scales. Some of those could be broken down to the amount of information, international trade, capital and immigration different nation states participate in. This can also be measured by the Global Connectedness Index. This mass measurement scale is used to calculate the activities that countries participate in, more specifically the globalization actives listed above that contribute to their economy's wealth. It was found by the Harvard Business Review in 2017 that the DHL had recorded their largest peak recording on the Global Connectedness Index scale to date. As it is shown that our social and economic worlds are becoming more globalized, with it there is strong natural growing demand and need for multilingualism in both the economic and social spheres. The noticeable increase in globalization in the past has resulted in the UNICEF's support for multilingual programs in school systems. At the 2019 UNICEF Bangkok conference, Andrew Glass the Director of British Council Thailand stated on behalf of the UNICEF, "Multilingual education prepares learners for the challenges of the 21st century, language sustains cultural diversity, connects people with cultures, aids in understanding, and builds trust,". This statement made of behalf of the UNICEF has appropriately portrayed the rising levels of bi or multilingualism. Countries in different parts of the world, United States included are becoming more populated with persons living in a country separate from which they were born in. As of 2011 there are over 20 million people living in the United States who do not dominantly speak English, calling for more a linguistically equip workforce in the future. The growing need for a more multilingual workforce is apparent in the U.S. according to survey and analysis completed in 2014. Multiple scholars from George town, Harvard, and Michigan University collected sample data from employers on their knowledge of a second language requirements for the hiring process. Its shown that across different business sizes a large proportion of employers actively seek out graduates who have ties with language nonnative to the area of employment.

== Korean Wave ==
The relationship between listening to music and furthering the ability to retain a new language are found to be positively correlated. People partake in listening to music to learn another language and some partake in learning a different language to be able to understand music. According to the Modern Language Association it was reported that in 2016 there was a noticeable steady increase of enrollment in Korean language university courses within the United States, correlated with the rise of the Korean wave or "Hallyu." For example, from the late 1990s it has been recognized that a rise in the dissemination of Korean culture worldwide through music and media exists.

Becoming multilingual for the sake of participating in Korean culture is one way the Korean wave has engaged in process of globalization, nonetheless there are also more notable instances as well. According to the University of Hawaii Press populations outside of Korea in Israel and Palestine have been effected by this type of globalization. In places such as these locations that are now consuming Korean culture there are growing numbers in social science and anthropological academic writings written about countries whom are not their own, Korea being just one of them. This process of widening the spectrum of information on world cultures readily available in different parts of the world is reversing the effects of homogenization of information in power states.
