= Lernu! =

Esperanto learning tool

lernu!
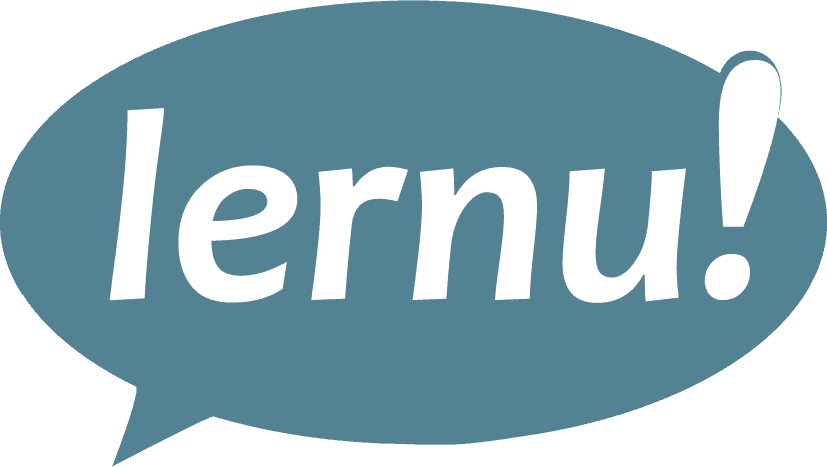
- Website type: Language learning
- Owner: E@I
- Creator: E@I
- Website: lernu.net
- Commercial: No
- Registration: Required
- Launched: December 2002; 23 years ago
- Current status: Active

lernu! is a multilingual, web-based free project for promoting and teaching Esperanto. The name Lernu comes from the imperative form of the Esperanto verb lerni, meaning "to learn". The site is run by E@I, an international youth organization, which started as a working group of the World Esperanto Youth Organization.

The site's content includes various tools for learning Esperanto, such as exercises, games, dictionaries, grammatical overviews, an examination system and a multimedia library with books, music, voice-narrated stories and videos. The site also provides communication services such as an instant messenger, discussion forums on various topics, and news about Esperanto events. Esperantists and Esperanto organizations can advertise their activities and services on the website.

== History ==
The lernu! project was first proposed at the first Esperanto@Interreto (now E@I) seminar in Stockholm, Sweden in April 2000, and was developed in October 2001 at the second seminar of E@I, in Uppsala. In July 2002, the project received monetary support from the American Esperantic Studies Foundation (ESF), and work on the website started in August of the same year. It was publicly launched on 21 December 2002, and from then on has been supervised and developed by E@I with the ESF support and the help from many individual supporters and assistants.

During four years of the project's development, several people contributed. The core team was responsible for the overall supervision and development of lernu!. It was assisted by several designers and programmers. Dozens of translators used a specially-made online translation system to make the website available in more than 20 languages.

== Courses ==
There are multiple courses on the website, ranging from simple word learning (Bildoj kaj Demandoj) to difficult rewriting of stories (Kio okazas)

== Interface ==
Users are able to view the site's interface in their choice of 24 languages – Catalan, Chinese (both simplified and traditional characters), Danish, English, Esperanto, Finnish, French, Georgian, German, Hebrew, Hungarian, Italian, Kirundi, Kiswahili, Norwegian (Bokmål), Persian, Portuguese, Romanian, Russian, Serbian, Slovak, Slovenian, Swedish and Ukrainian; a further five languages—Bulgarian, Croatian, Czech, Indonesian and Spanish—have at least 70 percent of the interface localized; nine additional languages – Dutch, Greek, Japanese, Korean, Lithuanian, Polish, Thai, Turkish and Vietnamese – are in varying stages of completing the interface translation.

== Statistics ==
- About 50,000 lernu.net users possess at least a basic understanding of Esperanto.
- In 2013, the website reported 150,000 registered users and had between 150,000 and 200,000 visitors each month.
- As of October 2018, Lernu had 320,000 registered users.
- Currently, the website is being visited nearly 75 thousand times per month.
- Most of the visitors come from Europe, South-East Asia and both Americas.
