= Taivalkoski =

- Municipality
- Taivalkosken kunta Taivalkoski kommun
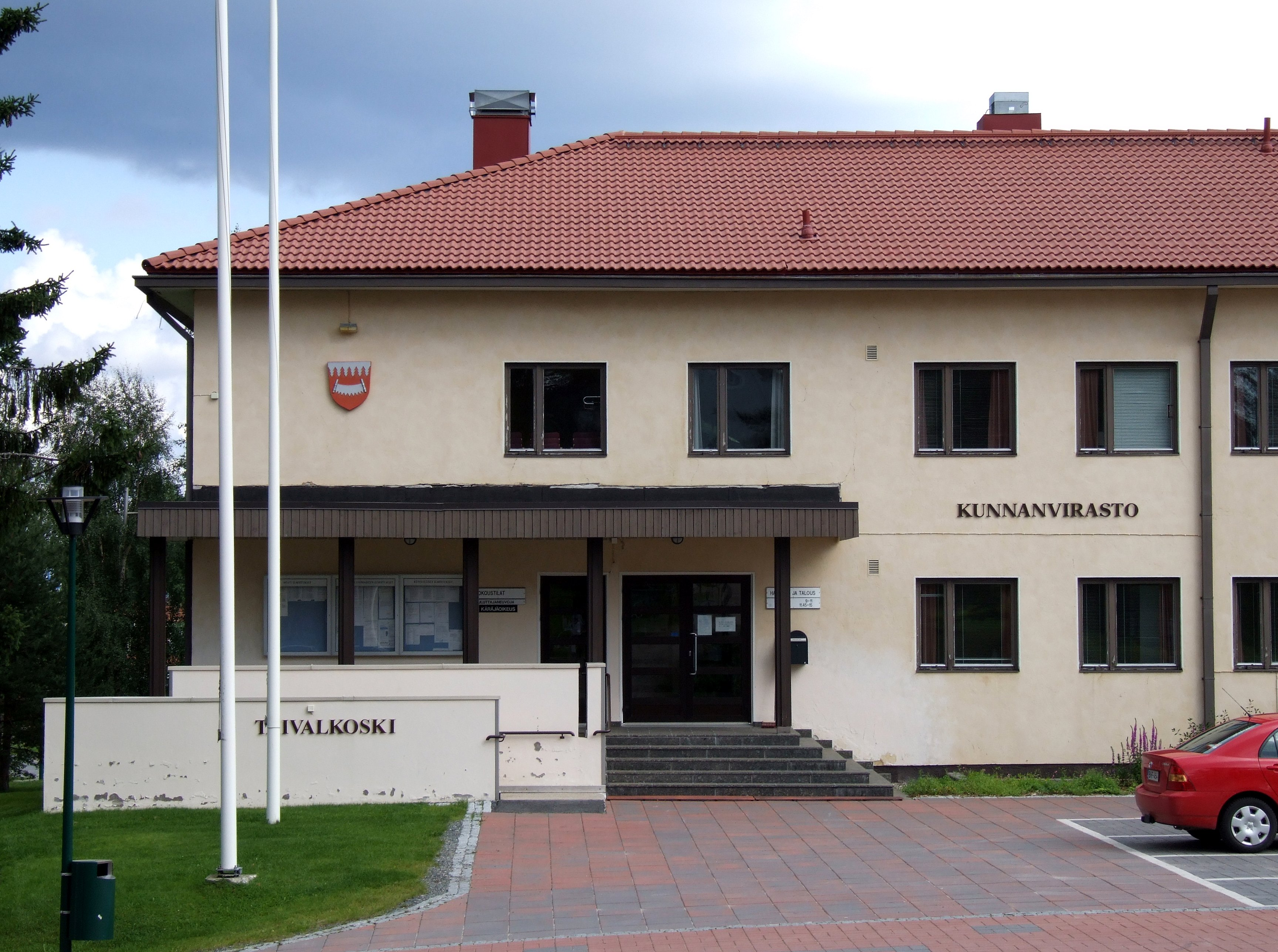
- Taivalkoski Town Hall

- Coat of arms

- Location of Taivalkoski in Finland
- Interactive map of Taivalkoski
- Coordinates: 65°34.5′N 028°14.5′E
- Country: Finland
- Region: North Ostrobothnia
- Sub-region: Koillismaa
- Charter: 1879

Government
  - Municipal manager: Jukka Mikkonen

Area (2018-01-01)
  - Total: 2,650.66 km^{2} (1,023.43 sq mi)
  - Land: 2,438.21 km^{2} (941.40 sq mi)
  - Water: 212.59 km^{2} (82.08 sq mi)
  - Rank: 25th largest in Finland

Population (2025-12-31)
  - Total: 3,555
  - Rank: 199th largest in Finland
  - Density: 1.46/km^{2} (3.8/sq mi)

Population by native language
  - Finnish: 97.5% (official)
  - Others: 2.5%

Population by age
  - 0 to 14: 14.4%
  - 15 to 64: 54.6%
  - 65 or older: 31%
- Time zone: UTC+02:00 (EET)
  - Summer (DST): UTC+03:00 (EEST)
- Website: www.taivalkoski.fi

Taivalkoski (Finnish pronunciation: [ˈtɑi̯ʋɑlˌkoski]) is a municipality of Finland, it is located in the Province of Oulu and is part of the Northern Ostrobothnia region.

The municipality has a population of 3,555 (31 December 2025) and covers an area of 2,650.66 square kilometres (1,023.43 sq mi) of which 212.59 km^{2} (82.08 sq mi) is water. The population density is 1.46 inhabitants per square kilometre (3.8/sq mi).

The municipality is unilingually Finnish. The neighbouring municipalities are Kuusamo, Posio, Pudasjärvi and Suomussalmi. The Iijoki river runs through the centre of the village.

The oldest still-operating shop of Finland, Jalavan Kauppa, is located in Taivalkoski; a shop was founded in 1883 by White Karelian-based Stephan Jakowleff, which is owned by his descendants of the Jalava family.

== Notable people ==
- Osmo Buller (born 1950), Esperantist
- Tapio Räisänen (born 1949), ski jumper
- John Michaelson (1893–1968), baseball player
- Pirkko Moisala (born 1953), ethnomusicologist
- Kalle Päätalo (1919–2000), novelist
- Tuulikki Ukkola (1943–2019), journalist and politician

== International relations ==
=== Twin towns — Sister cities ===
- Illuka Parish, Estonia
