= La Ondo de Esperanto =

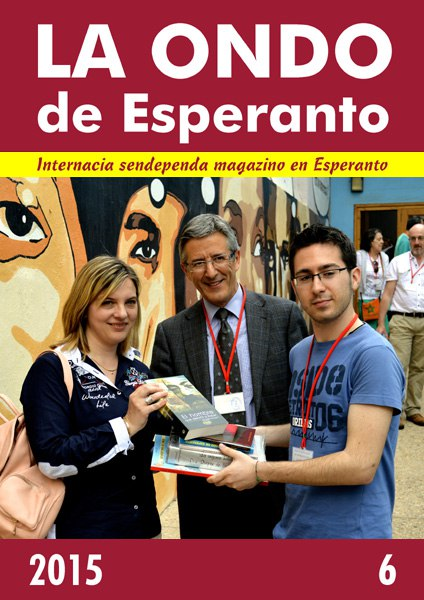
Cover page of the 6th issue of 2015

La Ondo de Esperanto (English: The Wave of Esperanto) was an illustrated Esperanto periodical published monthly in the Russian Baltic Sea enclave of Kaliningrad (formerly Königsberg). Since 2017 it has been available only as an online magazine in PDF or EPUB formats.

The publication inherits its name from a magazine of the same title published from 1909 to 1921 by Aleksandr Saĥarov. Since its revival in 1991, more than 300 issues have been produced. Each issue has about 20 to 30 articles — some brief, others lengthy — on Esperantist activities throughout the world. A free literary supplement was bound into each year's December issue. Issues are typically 24 pages in A4 format, with numerous pictures and illustrations.

== Regular columns ==
In "Tribuno", La Ondo de Esperanto's popular letters column, readers discuss current problems of the Esperanto community. Each issue contains stories and/or poetry, some written in the planned language Esperanto, others translated from various other languages. In cooperation with the European Esperanto Union, each month's issue includes that federation's Eŭropa Bulteno (European Bulletin) as well.

The magazine contains linguistic and historical articles and many reviews of newly published Esperanto literature and music. Many readers enjoy the "Mozaiko" section with its quizzes and competitions as well as humorous and easy-reading pieces. Columnists Alen Kris and "Komitatano Z" (Committee member Z) comment on events in the outside world or inside the Esperanto world. In November 2004 the magazine began a new column on autonomous regions within nation states, such as Russia's North Ossetia–Alania and Spanish Catalonia.

== International contributors ==
Writers from many countries worldwide are regular contributors, including William Auld, Osmo Buller, Renato Corsetti, Fernando de Diego, István Ertl, Paul Gubbins, Sten Johansson, Wolfgang Kirschstein, Lee Chong-Yeong, Ulrich Lins, Daniel Luez, Valentin Melnikov, Julian Modest, Gonçalo Neves, Sergio Pokrovskij, Anna Ritamäki, Ziko Marcus Sikosek (Ziko van Dijk), Giorgio Silfer and Walter Żelazny.

== Esperanto movement activities ==
Since 1998 La Ondo de Esperanto has supervised the Esperantist of the Year Award, and has helped to arrange various Esperanto meetings in Russia and Eastern Europe. The publication also organizes annual photographic and literary competitions. Editor Aleksander Korĵenkov and publisher Halina Gorecka travel regularly to various European countries to lecture.
