= Ilona Koutny =

Hungarian linguist and Esperantist

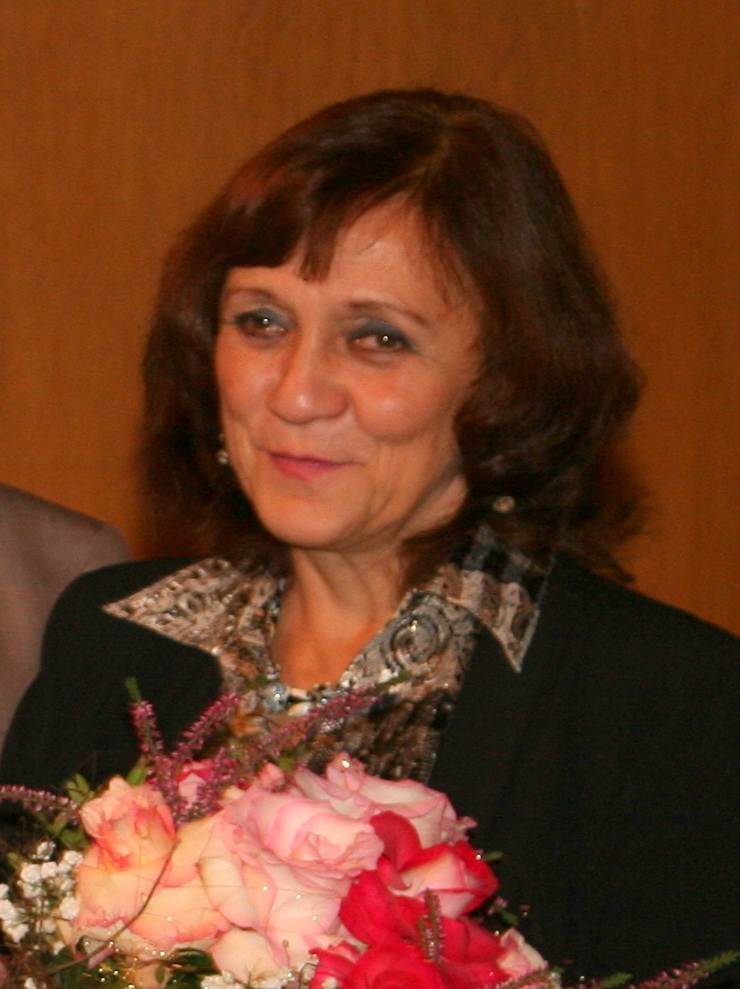
Ilona Koutny (2018)

Ilona Koutny (born 1 March 1953 in Budapest) is a Hungarian linguist and Esperantist. She works as a professor in Poznań, Poland. In 2008, she was honoured as "Esperantist of the Year" by the magazine La Ondo de Esperanto.

== Life ==
Koutny studied linguistics at Budapest's Eötvös Loránd University, where she also received her doctorate. There she gave language lessons and developed the "ESPAROL" system for the Esperanto language. After the death of Professor István Szerdahelyi, she took over his chair of Esperanto and Linguistics at Eötvös University in 1987. Koutny also taught computational linguistics.

After moving to Poland, she habilitated at the Adam Mickiewicz University in Poznan (UAM) in 2009. The following year she took over the chair of Finno-Ugristics and became a professor in 2011. There she taught Hungarian language and linguistics at the Linguistic Institute of Mickiewicz University in Poznań (PL), where she founded the postgraduate programme in Interlinguistics.

Koutny is an associate professor at the International Academy of Sciences San Marino (AIS; Esperanto: Akademio Internacia de la Sciencoj), member of ILEI, CED. She was a member of the Akademio de Esperanto from 1998 to 2016.

Koutny has written several dictionaries and is co-editor of the Polish journal Język. Komunikacja. Informacja.

Her husband Zbigniew Galor (1952-2017) was a university lecturer in sociology in Szczecin, an Esperantist and President of the Polish branch of the AIS.
