= Interlinguistics =

Subfield of linguistics

Interlinguistics, also known as cosmoglottics, (Note: Sergey N. Kuznetsov distinguishes between cosmoglottics, the science of universal planned language, and interlinguistics, the science of international languages and communication.) is the subfield of linguistics that studies planned languages with practical and theoretical perspectives. Formalised by Otto Jespersen in 1931 as the science of interlanguages, in more recent times, the field has been more focused with language planning, the collection of strategies to deliberately influence the structure and function of a living language. In this framework, interlanguages become a subset of planned languages, i.e. extreme cases of language planning.

Interlinguistics first appeared as a branch of studies devoted to the establishment of norms for auxiliary languages, but over its century-long history it has been understood by different authors more and more broadly as an interdisciplinary branch of science which includes various aspects of communication, language planning and standardization, multilingualism and globalisation, language policy, translation, sociolinguistics, intercultural communication, the history of language creation and literature written in constructed languages (including both international auxiliary languages and fictional artistic languages), as well as lingua francas, pidgins and creoles.

== Etymology and history ==
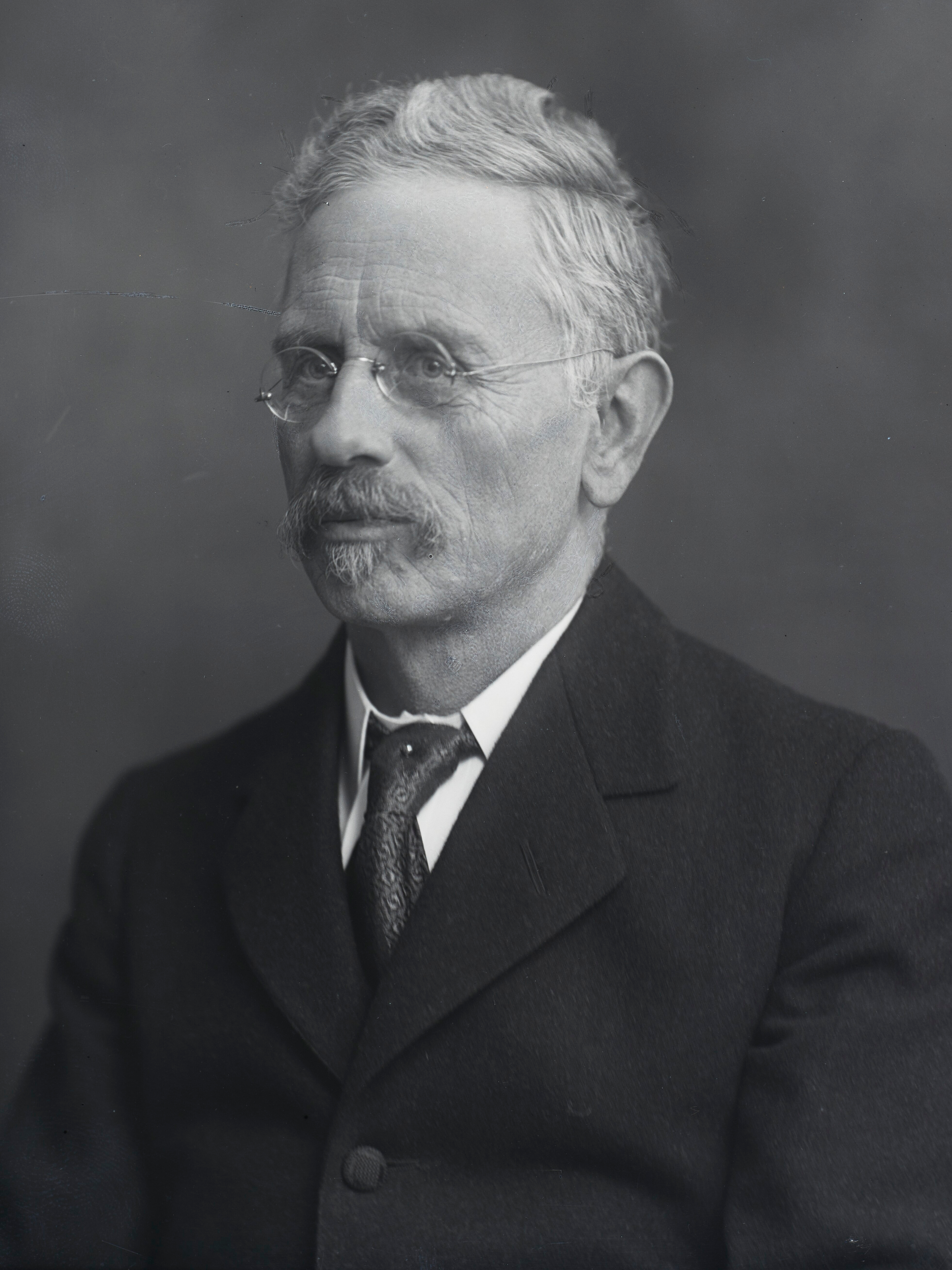
Otto Jespersen is commonly regarded as the founder of the field of interlinguistics.

The hybrid term was first coined in French (as Interlinguistique) by the Belgian Esperantist Jules Meysmans.

The main historical periods of interlinguistics are:

- first, the pioneer era (1879–1911), when its basis was put forth;
- secondly, the foundational era (1911–1951), when the interlinguistics wars took place to decide the most appropriate form of an auxiliary language;
- thirdly, the school era (1951–1990), when independent Interlinguistics schools formed in different countries, mainly Germany, Hungary, Italy, the Netherlands, and Poland, each with particular attention to Esperanto;
- lastly, the current era of language policy (1990–today), during which interlinguistics is more tightly integrated with other disciplines, mainly linguistics and various social and political sciences, particularly via the topics of globalism, linguistic justice, management of multilingualism, and new forms of mobility.

At the Institute of Linguistics of Adam Mickiewicz University (Poznań) there is the extramural Interlinguistic studies program. "Over the course of three years these studies provide the students with a basic knowledge of general linguistics, interlinguistics, international and intercultural communication with a focus on the linguistics, culture and movement of the internationally dispersed and naturally functioning planned language Esperanto." As of 2017, every third year the Interlinguistic Studies program was also organizing an international interlinguistic symposium.

The University of Amsterdam also has a chair of interlinguistics and Esperanto.

== Field of studies ==
The field of interlinguistics is concerned with international planned languages [also called 'constructed languages', 'auxiliary languages', or 'artificial languages'] as Esperanto, and with the relationship between planned languages and language planning. Increasingly, undergraduate courses in planned languages are expanding to embrace not only the history of languages planned for international use, but also the field of imaginary and fictional languages. Interlinguistics is also concerned with investigating how ethnic and international planned languages work as lingua franca and with the possibilities of optimizing interlinguistic communication.

The term Interlinguistics can be interpreted in at least two ways:

1. Study of interlinguae, i.e., of interlanguages that serve for interlinguistic communication - not to be confused with the interim languages of language learners, which also came to be called "interlanguages" by some authors.
2. Study of phenomena that can be observed inter linguae 'between languages'.

Among these interpretations, the first one is by far the most well established, while Mario Wandruszka had only the second one in mind.

The term appears first to have been used in French (interlinguistique) by Jules Meysmans in 1911 in a text concerning international auxiliary languages. It became more widely accepted subsequent to an address by the Danish linguist Otto Jespersen to the 2nd International Congress of Linguists in 1931. According to Jespersen, interlinguistics is "that branch of the science of language which deals with the structure and basic ideas of all languages with the view to the establishing of a norm for interlanguages, i.e. auxiliary languages destined for oral and written use between people who cannot make themselves understood by means of their mother tongues". According to this definition, investigations that are useful for optimizing interlinguistic communication are central to the discipline, and the purpose may be to develop a new language intended for international use or for use within a multilingual country or union. Research of this kind has been undertaken by the International Delegation, which developed Ido (1907), and by the International Auxiliary Language Association (IALA), which developed Interlingua (1951).

Valter Tauli considered interlinguistics as a subdiscipline of language planning. The principles recommended by him for language planning applied to the guided development of national languages are also, and more liberally so, applicable to constructed interlanguages. It is noteworthy that these principles have close counterparts among Grice's conversational maxims. These maxims describe how effective communication in conversation is achieved, and in order to function well, a language must be such that it allows respecting these maxims, which languages not always do.

Most publications in the field of interlinguistics are, however, not so constructive, but rather descriptive, comparative, historic, sociolinguistic, or concerned with translation by humans or machines. As for Esperanto, which is the most widely used constructed interlanguage, there is a relatively abundant literature about the language itself and its philology (see Esperantology).

Only a few of the many constructed languages have been applied practically to any noteworthy extent. The most prosperous were Volapük (1879, Johann Martin Schleyer), Esperanto (1887 Ludwik Lejzer Zamenhof), Latino sine flexione (1903, Giuseppe Peano), Ido (1907, Louis Couturat), Occidental-Interlingue (1922, Edgar de Wahl) and Interlingua (1951, IALA and Alexander Gode), with Esperanto being the one gathering the most significant community of active speakers at present. Here, the Bliss symbols (1949, Charles K. Bliss) deserve also to be mentioned. These were intended for international communication, but have found their field of application elsewhere, namely as an aid for persons who lack an adequate ability of using ordinary language, because of motorical or cognitive handicaps.

== Kinds of interlanguages ==
The following table lists only one representative for each type explicitly.

	Spoken language only	Spoken and written language	Written language only	Gestural language	Multimedial language
Spontaneous	Russenorsk and others	Tok Pisin and other stabilized pidgins	Classical Chinese (used interlinguistically)	Plains Indian Sign Language	Silbo gomero and other whistled languages
Constructed	Damin (not interlinguistic)	Esperanto and others	Bliss symbols and other pasigraphies	Gestuno (for the deaf)	Solresol

Among constructed languages, it is usual to distinguish between a priori languages and a posteriori languages. The latter are based on one or, more often, several source languages, while this is not evident for a priori languages, e.g., the philosophical languages of the 17th century, Solresol and the logical languages of the 20th century, such as Loglan and Lojban. Spontaneously arisen Interlanguages are necessarily a posteriori or iconic (using imaging or imitating signs).

== Bibliography ==
- Barandovská-Frank, Vĕra (2020). Interlingvistiko. Enkonduko en la sciencon pri planlingvoj (PDF) (in Esperanto). Poznań: Univ. Adam Mickiewicz. p. 333. ISBN 9788365483539.
- Blanke, Detlev (1985). Internationale Plansprachen (Eine Einführung) [International Constructed Languages (An Introduction)] (in German). Berlin: Akademie-Verlag. ISSN 0138-550X.
- Gobbo, Federico (2020). Introduction to Interlinguistics. Munich: GRIN Publishing. p. 156.
- Gode, Alexander (1951). Interlingua: A Dictionary of the International Language. New York: Storm Publishers.
- Jespersen, Otto (1931). "Interlinguistics". International Communication. Archived from the original on 28 October 2009.
- Кузнецов, С.Н. (1987). Теоретические основы интерлингвистики [Theoretical Foundations of Interlinguistics]. Москва: Издательство Университета дружбы народов (University of peoples friendship).
- Peterson, David J. (2021) [2015]. The Art of Language Invention: From Horse-Lords to Dark Elves to Sand Worms, the Words Behind World-Building (Edition with revisions and a new chapter ed.). New York, NY: Penguin Books. p. 324. ISBN 9780143126461.
- Schubert, Klaus, ed. (1989). Interlinguistics. Aspects of the Science of Planned Languages. Berlin / New York: Mouton de Gruyter.
- Stillman, E. Clark; Gode von Aesch, Alexander (29 December 2006) [2001]. Breinstrup, Th.; Stenström, Ingvar; Olsson, Jesper (eds.). "Le tres principios principal del standardization — Un guida pro linguistas in le labor de constatar le vocabulario international de interlingua" [The three main principles of international standardization — A guide for linguists in the work of establishing the international vocabulary of Interlingua]. Union Mundial pro Interlingua (in Interlingua).

== See also ==
- International auxiliary language
- Constructed language
- Conlanging, the art of crafting tongues
- Metalinguistics
- Translingualism
- Linguistic universal
- Second language
- Code-switching
