= Ho, mia kor' =

"Ho, mia kor'" is considered to be the first literary text ever published in Esperanto. It is a short poem by L. L. Zamenhof, which was written a short time before he released Unua Libro (1887), in which it was published. In The Life of Zamenhof, Edmond Privat writes, "Zamenhof wrote at this time, very short verses. They sound much like the hard breathing of a person in a building, who runs to climb five flights of stairs and finally stops behind the door" (p. 35).

Ho, mia kor'

Ho, mia kor', ne batu maltrankvile,
El mia brusto nun ne saltu for!
Jam teni min ne povas mi facile,
Ho, mia kor'!

Ho, mia kor'! Post longa laborado
Ĉu mi ne venkos en decida hor'?
Sufiĉe! trankviliĝu de l' batado,
Ho, mia kor'!

Oh, My Heart

Oh, my heart, don't beat so uneasily,
Do not leap from my chest now!
I can barely hold myself now,
Oh, my heart!

Oh, my heart! After a long labor,
Will I not win in the critical hour?
Enough! ease your beating,
Oh, my heart!

The iambic pentameter (and iambic dimeter) rhythm of this poem can be considered an illustration of its subject matter.

== Sources ==
- Enciklopedio de Esperanto (1934).
