= Esperanto Museum and Collection of Planned Languages =

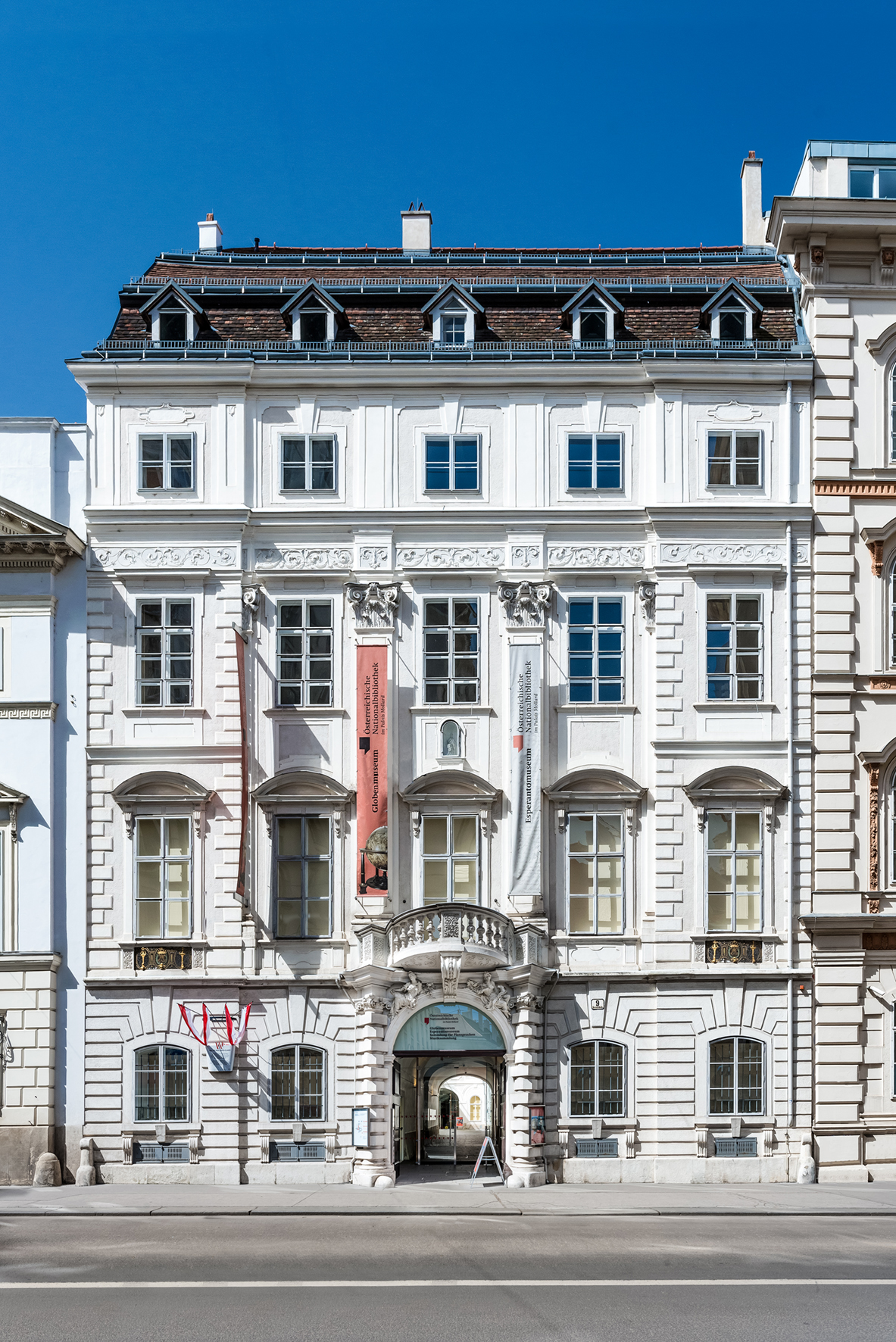
- Palais Mollard-Clary
- Established: 1927
- Location: Vienna, Austria
- Type: Language museum
- Website: http://www.onb.ac.at

The Esperanto Museum of the Austrian National Library is one of the oldest language museums in the world and one of the major institutions of its kind. Since its founding in 1927, the museum has housed an extensive library, which was designated the Department of Planned Languages in 1990. Over 90 years of continuous collecting has resulted in what is today the world's largest specialized library for Esperanto, planned languages, and interlinguistics.

== History ==
The Esperanto Museum was founded in 1927 by Hugo Steiner as an association and integrated into the National Library in 1928 under the name International Esperanto Museum. According to Hugo Steiner, the idea to establish an Esperanto Museum arose during the 19th World Esperanto Congress in Danzig in 1927 and traces back to Felix Zamenhof, a brother of Ludwik Zamenhof. After the annexation of Austria the collection was closed by the Gestapo in 1938. It was reopened in 1947 in the St. Michael’s Wing of the Hofburg. In 2005, the Esperanto Museum and the Department of Planned Languages moved to Palais Mollard-Clary at Vienna's Herrengasse 9.

== Collection ==
With more than 150,000 media items the Department of Planned Languages is the world's largest specialized library for interlinguistics and documents around 500 different planned languages (and projects), including Volapük, Ido, Interlingue (Occidental), and Interlingua. The collection preserves and provides approximately 45,000 volumes, 30,000 letters and manuscripts, 22,000 photographs, 4,500 different periodical titles, 3,500 museum objects, 1,800 posters, 1,700 audiovisual media, and more than 80 archives from personal and institutional provenance, including holdings from Marjorie Boulton, Kálmán Kalocsay, Juan Régulo Pérez, Manuel de Seabra, Eugen Wüster, Ludwik Zamenhof, and the archive of the Universal Esperanto Association. The items can be searched online in the QuickSearch and ÖNB Digital catalogues, with more than 45,000 catalogue entries providing direct links to digital copies.

== Exhibition ==
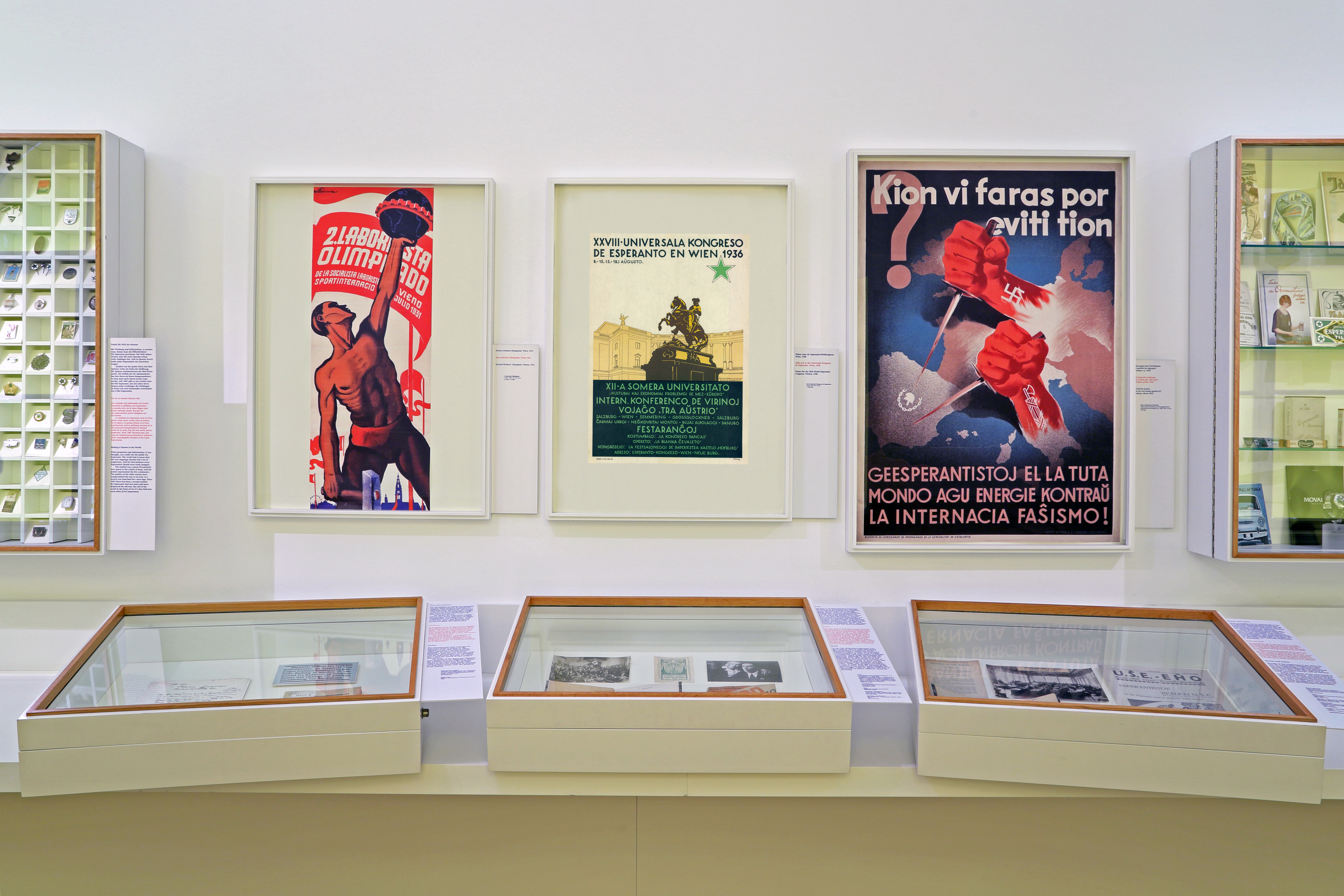
Exhibition in the Esperanto Museum

The multimedia permanent exhibition explores the eventful history of Esperanto, from the publication of the Unua Libro in 1887, through its rapid spread before World War I, and persecutions under National Socialism, to its use today. Esperanto has continually advanced in the field of literature, as demonstrated, among other things, by original Esperanto works by Gyula Baghy, William Auld, and Spomenka Štimec, which have been translated into several other languages. Interactive multimedia stations also present other planned languages, such as the mystical Lingua Ignota by Hildegard von Bingen, the musical language Solresol, and the Klingon language from the television series Star Trek.

== Bibliography ==
- Köstner, Christina (2005): Glück im Unglück. Das Esperantomuseum an der Nationalbibliothek Wien 1938–1945. Language Problems and Language Planning 29 (2), 177–186. DOI: https://doi.org/10.1075/lplp.29.2.06kos
- Mayer, Herbert (2008): Eine traditionelle Bibliothek und ihre Herausforderungen. Die Sammlung für Plansprachen der Österreichischen Nationalbibliothek. Plansprachliche Bibliotheken und Archive. Beiträge der 17. Jahrestagung der Gesellschaft für Interlinguistik e.V., 23.–25. November 2007 in Berlin (Interlinguistische Informationen, Beiheft 15), 33–36.
- Tuider, Bernhard (2020): Esperanto and Planned Languages: The Aims of the Museum and Department. Museums of Language and the Display of Intangible Cultural Heritage, 165–188. DOI: https://doi.org/10.4324/9780429491610
- Tuider, Bernhard (July 27, 2019): Esperanto, Plansprachen und Sprachplanung. Zum 90-Jahr-Jubiläum des Esperantomuseums der Österreichischen Nationalbibliothek (Blog of the Austrian National Library) Retrieved July 4, 2025.
- Tuider, Bernhard (2018): Bibliothek und Ideologie – Die Nationalbibliothek in der Zwischenkriegszeit zwischen Deutschnationalismus und Esperantosammlung. Schatzkammer des Wissens. 650 Jahre Österreichische Nationalbibliothek, 130–137.

== See also ==
- Esperanto library
- Hector Hodler Library
- Center for Documentation and Study about the International Language
- Montagu C. Butler Library
- Esperanto Museum in Svitavy
- The Ludwik Zamenhof Centre
