= Alphonse Matejka =

Swiss interlinguist (1902–1999)

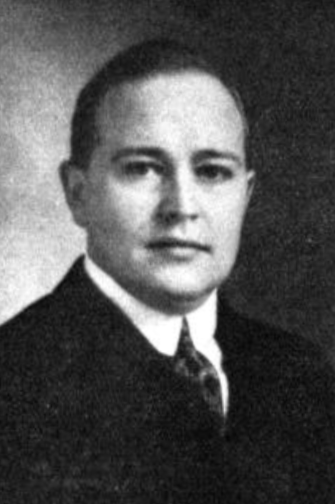
- Matejka before 1937
- Born: 9 January 1902; St. Gallen, Switzerland
- Died: 27 October 1999 (aged 97); La Chaux-de-Fonds, Switzerland
- Occupations: Interlinguist, exports specialist
- Organization(s): ULI, CDELI, Occidental-Academie

Alphonse Matejka (9 January 1902 – 27 October 1999) was a Swiss exports specialist and proponent of international auxiliary language. Born in St. Gallen to a Czech father and Swiss mother, he worked in the textiles and watchmaking industries, and lived much of his life in La Chaux-de-Fonds. Matejka is best known for his work in the international language movement; first supporting Ido, and later Occidental, he led numerous organisations in the fields, and authored several books teaching these languages. Matejka also helped to found the Center for Documentation and Study about the International Language.

== Early life ==
The Matejka family originated from Vyškovec in Moravia. Matejka's father emigrated to Switzerland in his youth, arriving before 1900, and was granted Swiss citizenship in 1915. His mother was Swiss, and came from the canton of St. Gallen. Alphonse was born in St. Gallen on 9 January 1902.

Matejka completed gymnasium and graduated in St. Gallen, and became a Swiss citizen himself. He apprenticed in an embroidery shop, Reichenbach & Co; he spent ten years working at its Paris branch. While in Paris, he took evening classes in foreign languages, learning Romance and Scandinavian languages, as well as Swahili and Russian. For a period, Matejka wrote for a Russian-language journal and translated for the Academy of Sciences. Matekja also worked in the exports of a button company, first in Zürich and from 1936 in Amsterdam.

On 26 July 1928 while in Paris, Matejka married the French Jeanne Bellanger. In 1937, Matejka settled in La Chaux-de-Fonds, Switzerland – he worked in the watchmaking industry as an exports specialist. After the death of Bellanger in 1987, Matejka withdrew from public activities and moved to the nursing home L'Escale (English: The Stopover) in La Chaux-de-Fonds; he died on 27 October 1999, aged 97.

== Views ==
Alongside several other supporters of international languages, Matejka was a proponent of Pan-Europeanism, and writing and speaking on the topic; according to Edo Bernasconi, he was an ethnocentrist in believing that "the international auxiliary language should be a phenomenon and ideal of 'higher civilizations'". In addition, he was a supporter of the ideas of Silvio Gesell, who advocated for economic freedom. Matejka had a strong interest in foreign languages, and also supported reform of German spelling.

=== International languages ===
==== Ido ====
In 1918, Matejka bought a copy of Albert Nötzli's Ido textbook, and upon comparing the language with Esperanto found it to be superior; Matejka was thus never an Esperantist, and joined the Idist movement. Matejka took on roles in several societies, and attended four congresses; for the next three years, he was a member of the Ido club in St. Gallen, and later joined an organisation for the language in Paris. He was secretary of the Union for the International Language Ido (ULI) from 1929 to 1934, and its president in 1940 after he had moved to Paris. For a term spanning 1934-35, Matekja was president of the national Swiss Ido society (Ido: Suisa Ido-Societo). Matejka worked with Ido periodicals such as Suisian Idisto and Ido-Kuriero, and was the editor of the ULI's bulletin during his period as secretary. When the magazine Progreso was restarted in 1913, Matejka was made its editor-in-chief; he kept the position until 1934.

==== Interlingue-Occidental ====
And years later, a thunderstorm broke out, although only a very small portion of the world population noticed it, when the Idist Alphonse Matejka... switched to de Wahl's army.

— Roberto Garvía, Esperanto and Its Rivals

After Edgar de Wahl created Occidental in 1922, several Idists came to support it, especially from 1928. Matejka, however, was a critic of the language – believing that the best international language would come from improving Ido, he had argued against Occidental: Ric Berger described him as "the most active and competent defender of Ido, and polemist against Occ[idental]". When Matejka argued against the Occidentalists, he often did so using the pseudonyms "Franko Veramido" and "Scorpion". However, disillusioned by the attitudes of more conservative Idists, he renounced Ido and joined the Occidental movement in 1937.

Matejka's departure from Ido caused a stir in the Idist movement; he soon became a corresponding member of the Occidental-Acadamie; from 1943 to 1946 he was its interim president, and president in 1949. Throughout the 1940s, Matejka was president of the senate of the Occidental-Union (the international Occidentalist organisation), and represented the language at the International Auxiliary Language Association (IALA). Author of several courses and textbooks for Interlingue, for over two decades (Note: Sources disagree on Matejka's period as editor of Cosmoglotta: Künzli (2006) writes that Matejka was co-editor from 1937 to 1958, and chief editor from 1958 to 1980. Barandovská-Frank (2020) says that Matejka was editor from 1950 to 1954, with Kurt Hamburger as editor from then until 1962 – no editor is mentioned until the editorship was given to Adrian J. Pilgrim in 1985.) between 1937 and 1985, Matejka was editor of Cosmoglotta, the main organ of the Occidental movement. His position as editor brought him respect in the international language movement; in Cosmoglotta, he published his own works and translations (such as the works of Anton Chekhov), as well as essays against other languages, such as Basic English and Interlingua.

When Interlingua was published by the IALA in 1951, many Occidentalists left Interlingue, (Note: Occidental was renamed to "Interlingue" in 1949 - this was to avoid associations with the West in the background of a Europe divided by the Cold War.) especially following Berger's departure – this largely destroyed the movement. Matejka found the two languages to be 90% similar in vocabulary, and the Interlingue-Union advocated positive relations with the Interlingua movement, even after the IALA was liquidated in 1953. Matejka published his last article in Cosmoglotta aged 85, in 1985.

==== CDELI ====
Matejka helped found the Centre de documentation et d'étude sur la langue internationale (Center for Documentation and Study about the International Language) in 1967; he worked especially with its archivist, Claude Gacond and with André Schild. Matejka donated large amounts of his collections of interlanguage-related material to the centre, and often visited until his death.

== Bibliography ==
- Matejka, Alphonse (1942). Occidental, die internationale Welthilfssprache : vollständiger Lehrgang in 20 Lektionen [Occidental, the international auxiliary language: Complete course in 20 lessons] (in German). Interlingue Institute. OCLC 732181314.
- —— (1945). Wörterbuch occidendal-deutsch und deutsch-occidental [Occidental-German and German-Occidental dictionary] (in German). Interlingue Institute. OCLC 1283653928.
- ——; Michajlov, Stoyadin (1971). Rukovodstvo po mezdunarodnija ezik Interlingue za búlgari [Guideline to the international auxiliary language Interlingue for Bulgarians] (in Bulgarian). Interlingue Institute. OCLC 84518015.

== Footnotes ==
=== Sources ===
- Barandovská-Frank, Vĕra [in Esperanto] (2020). Interlingvistiko: Enkonduko en la sciencon pri planlingvoj [Interlinguistics: Introduction to the Science of Constructed Languages] (PDF) (in Esperanto). Poznań: Adam Mickiewicz University. ISBN 978-83-65483-88-1.
- Künzli, Andreas [in Esperanto] (2006). Universalaj lingvoj en Svislando [Universal languages in Switzerland] (in Esperanto). La Chaux-de-Fonds: Svisa Esperanto-Societo; Centre de documentation et d'étude sur la langue internationale. ISBN 978-2-9700425-2-5.
  - "Parto 4: Ido" [Chapter 4: Ido] pp. 791-852
  - "Parto 5: Occidental-Interlingue" [Chapter 5: Occidental-Interlingue] pp. 853-866
  - "Parto 6: Interlingua (IALA)" [Chapter 6: Interlingua (IALA)] pp. 867-912
  - "Parto 7: Interlingvistiko kaj esperantologio" [Chapter 7: Interlinguistics and Esperantology] pp. 913–974
