= Hector Hodler =

Swiss Esperantist

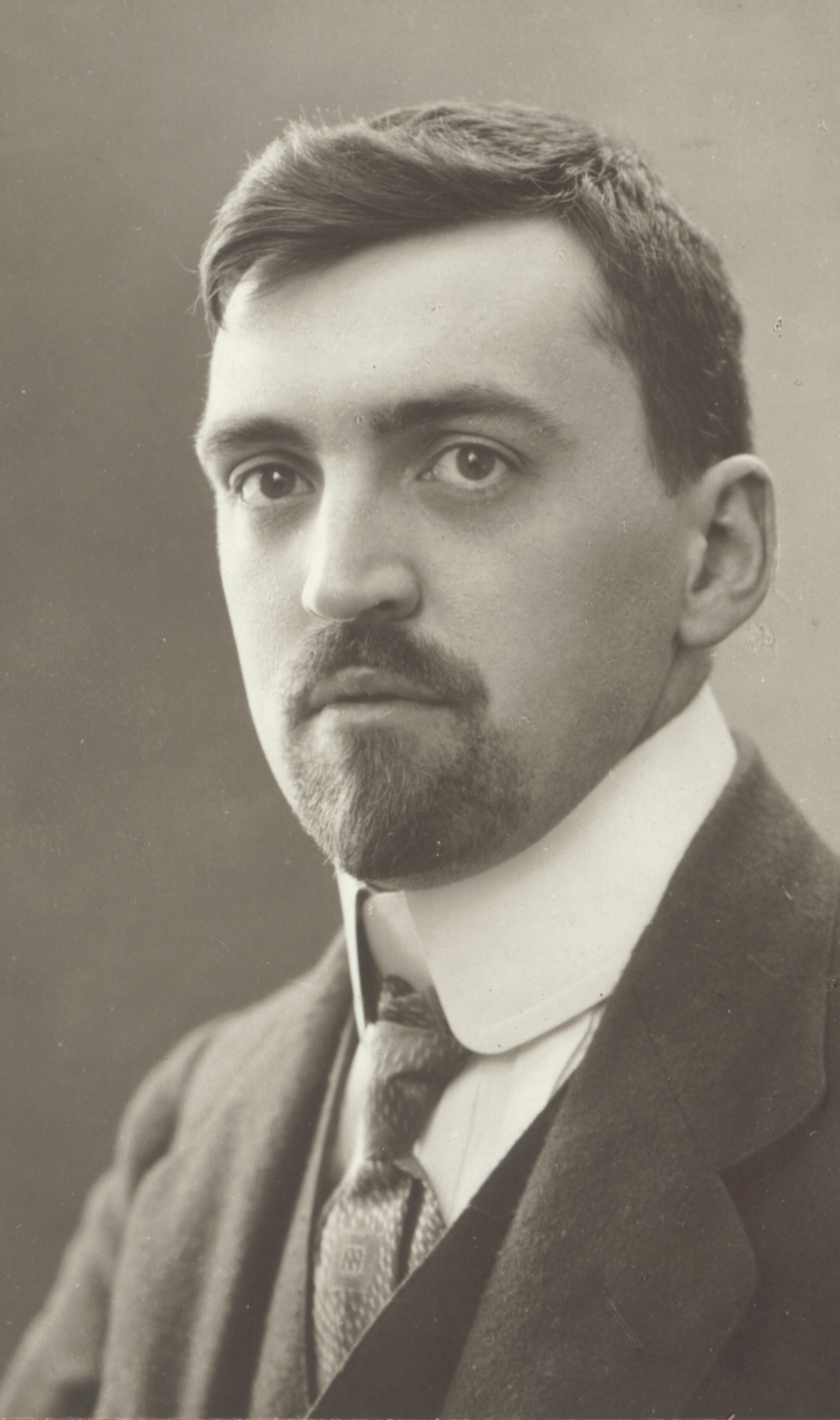
Hector Hodler (1917)

Hector Hodler (1 October 1887, in Geneva – 31 March 1920, in Leysin, Switzerland) was a Swiss Esperantist who had a strong influence on the early Esperanto movement.

Hodler was a son of the Swiss painter Ferdinand Hodler, who after a period of poverty became suddenly very well-to-do, and Augustine Dupin. As a 16-year-old, Hector Hodler learned Esperanto with his classmate Edmond Privat, and founded soon afterward a club and the journal Juna Esperantisto ("The Young Esperantist"). The schoolbench was their editorial office for five years as they managed production, addressed copies and replied to correspondence. Sometime later they learned about Idiom Neutral and about Bolak, in order to convince themselves as to whether Esperanto was truly the "best" international language. Besides The Young Esperantist, he authored articles in Through the World and the translation of the novel Paul et Virginie (Paul and Virginia) by Bernardin de Saint Pierre (1905).

In 1906, on the occasion of the second World Congress of Esperanto organised by Hodler and Privat (born in 1889), he saw in the organizational proposals by Théophile Rousseau and Alphonse Carles for Esperanto consuls (konsuloj) a chance to realize his plan to organize reciprocal self-help among people of good will. This was the germ of the Universal Esperanto Association (in Esperanto, UEA: Universala Esperanto-Asocio) of which Hodler was a co-founder.

In 1907 he took over the editorship of Esperanto magazine from its founder Paul Berthelot and made it a significant journal dealing with organizational questions from the language community. Esperanto also included many articles about social life, similar to the present magazine Monato. He edited it for 13 years until his death, except for six months in 1914 during the First World War. It is still produced as a publication associated with the UEA. He authored and translated many important articles, and he suggested translating masterpieces instead of trivial things. He signed his articles with the initials A. R.

The proposals of Rousseau and Carles were melded with his plans, were discussed in his magazine and received a warm welcome. By the third World Esperanto Congress in 1907, there were already about 200 consuls (delegates). Hodler and others such as Théophile Rousseau founded the Universal Esperanto Association on 28 April 1908, and Hodler became General Director and Vice-President. He was a friend and colleague of Eduard Stettler, and Edmond Privat was one of his editors. Hodler wanted to use the magazine "to create a strong bond of solidarity among members of diverse languages." During the war, Hodler, with the then secretary of the association Hans Jakob, organized the Wartime Assistance of the association.

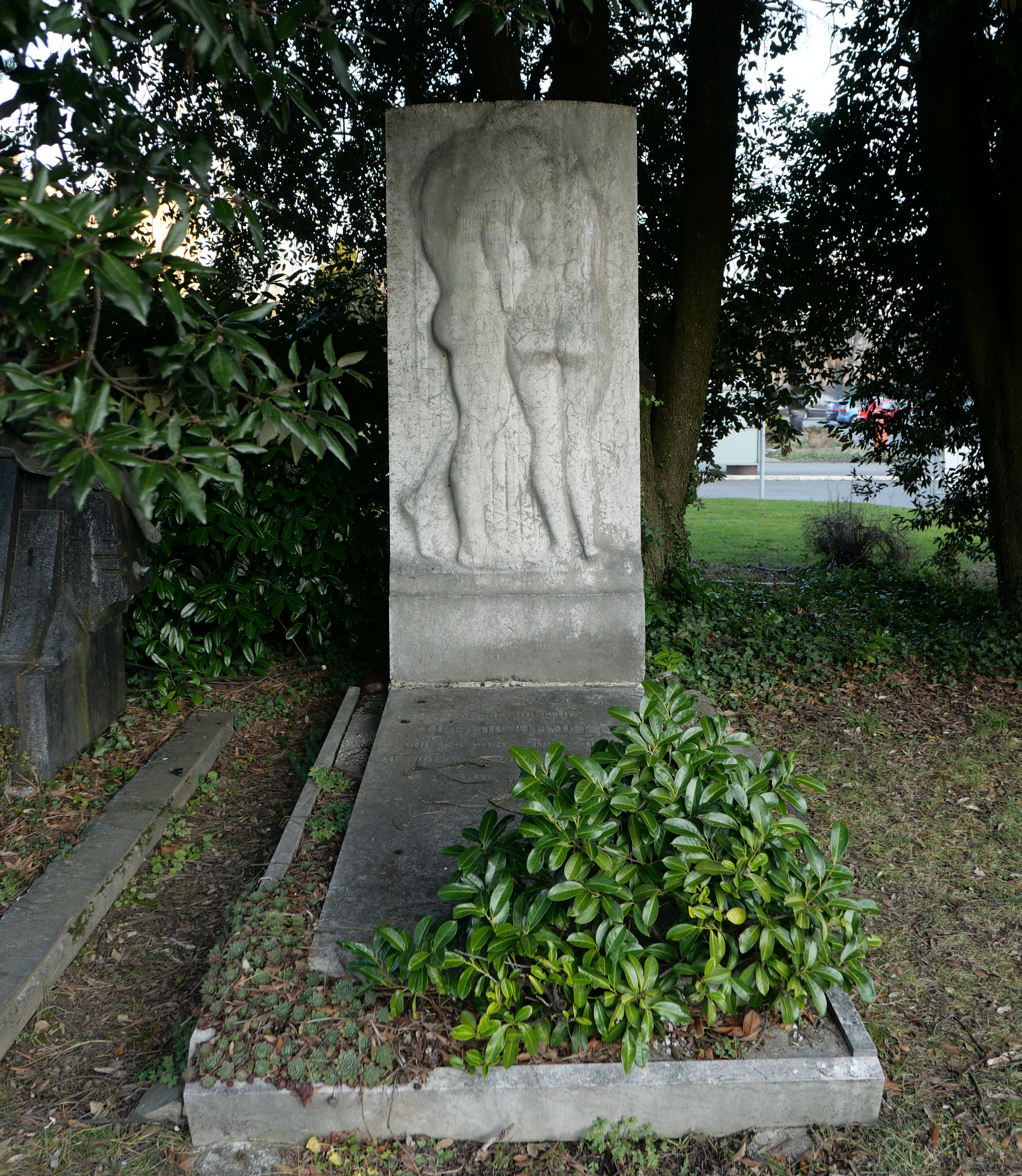
Hodler's grave in Geneva

After the death of Harold Bolingbroke Mudie in 1916, the presidency of the World Esperanto Association was vacant until after the war, when Hodler was elected to succeed him.

Hodler was especially interested in social questions, pacifism and animal protection. Privat wrote about him: "To that which the genius of Zamenhof initiated in the linguistic field, he added the necessary basis in the social field." According to an article by László Halka in Enciklopedio de Esperanto, "it is characteristic of his noble spirit and humanity that in Geneva he joined the local animal protection society, and that he said he would like to make the UEA an association to protect humans." In the last several years of his life, when he was already quite unhealthy, he turned mainly to scientific problems. In 1916 he wrote a 387-page work in French about the peaceful organization of peoples.

After his death in 1920, he bequeathed to the UEA the magazine Esperanto and his Esperanto library, which nowadays bears his name, as well as a large sum of money to ensure its continued existence.

He is buried at the cemetery of Saint George in Geneva next to his father.
