= Hector Hodler Library =

Library in Rotterdam, The Netherlands

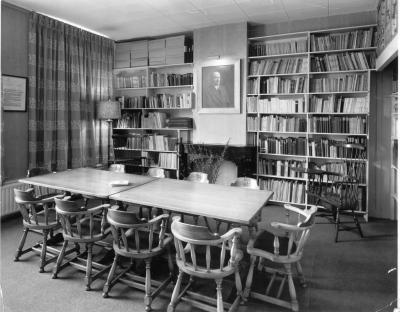
Reading room in the 1960s

The Hector Hodler Library is one of the largest Esperanto libraries, with approximately 30,000 books in addition to periodicals, manuscripts, photos, music, and other collections. It occupied three rooms in the central office of the Universal Esperanto Association (UEA) in Rotterdam, Netherlands, but the main part was transferred to the National Library of Polland (Biblioteka Narodowa) in Warsaw in 2023. This library is among the three most important collections in the world specializing in literature in and about the international planned language Esperanto.

== History ==
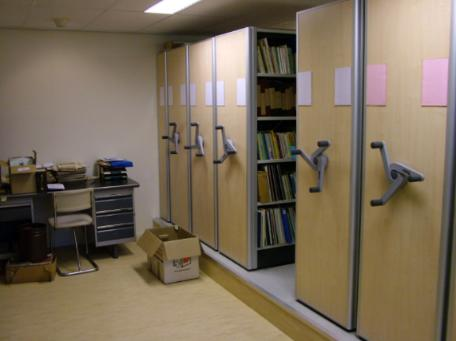
Archive in 2006

The Swiss Esperanto Society opened the library in Switzerland in 1908. In 1912, the library came into the possession of Hector Hodler, the founder of UEA, and after Hodler's death in 1920 the library remained under the management of UEA in Switzerland. In 1947, the library was renamed the Hector Hodler Library, and when UEA headquarters relocated to Rotterdam, the library was moved there in 1960.

By 2004, the library held over 15,000 volumes.

Other major collections of Esperanto literature are at

- International Esperanto Museum, part of the Austrian National Library,
- Montagu C. Butler Library, Britain
- Center for Documentation and Study about the International Language,
- Hendrik Conscience Heritage Library (Erfgoedbibliotheek H. Conscience) in Belgium

== See also ==
- Esperanto library
