= Heinrich Nidecker =

Swiss librarian and interlinguist (1894–1982)

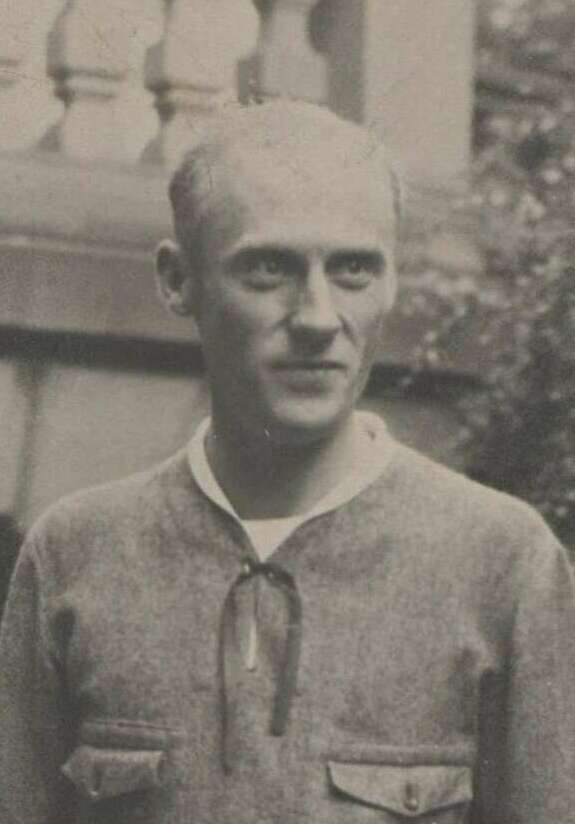
- Born: 24 September 1894; Illkirch-Graffenstaden, Alsace–Lorraine, German Empire
- Died: by September 1982 (aged 87); Arlesheim, Canton of Basel, Switzerland
- Citizenship: Swiss
- Education: University of Basel
- Occupation: Librarian

Heinrich Albert Nidecker (24 September 1894 – 1982), also known as Henri Nidecker, was a Swiss librarian and philologist. Born in Alsace, he completed degrees at the University of Basel, earning a doctorate English philology in 1924. Nidecker spent most of his career as a librarian at the Basel University Library, where he developed a cataloguing system, and was responsible for the departments of English philology and philosophy. Nidecker was involved in the international auxiliary language movement, supporting Ido and later Interlingue; he authored several works in the latter. Nidecker also wrote on topics of social reform, and on the history of music in Switzerland.

== Life ==
Heinrich Albert Nidecker was born on 24 September 1894 in Grafenstaden, Alsace, to Georg Nidecker and Lucinda Rose Cooper. After completing gymnasium in Müllhausen, and studying at the cantonal school of St. Gallen, he studied pedagogy, natural sciences and the English language at the University of Basel in 1915. After completing teaching exams in 1920, in 1924, he earned a Doctor of Philosophy degree, with his thesis on the work of English poet Samuel Taylor Coleridge. After that, he taught foreign languages at schools in Basel.

In 1924, Nidecker started work as an assistant librarian at Basel University Library. He developed Basel's central catalogue, and was responsible for the departments of English philology and philosophy. A member of the Vereinigung Schweizerischer Bibliothekare (Society of Swiss Librarians) and the Schweizerische Gesellschaft für Volkskunde (Swiss society for folklore), Nidecker retired in March 1960. He married Marguerite Estermann on 6 June 1931; they had one son together. Nidecker died in 1982 at the age of 87, in Arlesheim.

=== Views ===
Nidecker spoke several international auxiliary languages throughout his life, including Ido and Interlingue. He was president of both the Basel group of Idists and the Swiss Ido-Federation. At the 1928 Ido conference in Zürich, he spoke against the conservative arguments of Albert Nötzli; he later gave up the presidency of the Swiss federation and joined the Interlingue (then Occidental) movement. Nidecker wrote articles in several Occidental-language magazines, including Cosmoglotta and Helvetia, on topics such as language reform and economics. He led the Swiss Association for Occidental from 1934, and created several works in the language, including Occidental-language songs, a version of Goethe's poem Prometheus, and a German translation of an Occidental course by Frédéric Lagnel.

In the magazine Helvetia, Nidecker wrote in support of the ideas of Silvio Gesell (Freiwirtschaft), who advocated for economic freedom. In the same magazine, Nidecker also discussed Rudolf Steiner's advocacy for education reform. Nidecker was a supporter of both land reform and monetary reform.

== Works ==
Nidecker's doctoral thesis looked at Samuel Taylor Coleridge's Theory of Life, and its usage of material by Friedrich Wilhelm Joseph Schelling. It was never published, although Nidecker wrote a series of articles in the Révue de litterature comparée (English: Journal of Comparative Literature) on parts of the thesis, particularly on Coleridge's marginal notes concerning the works of other German philosophers. Nidecker's thesis argued that Coleridge had significantly plagiarised Schelling in his Theory of Life; Nidecker also discussed a shift by Coleridge from Kantian philosophy to that of Schelling.

Nidecker was the author of several books and pamphlets concerning universal languages, a free economy, and music; he contributed to journals about English philology and interlinguistics. As a hobbyist, he was somewhat known for his writings on the history of music of Switzerland. Nidecker built a collection of interlinguistic materials, which was taken on by Basel University Library, and eventually became part of the Centre de documentation et d'étude sur la langue internationale in La Chaux-de-Fonds.

== See also ==
- Alphonse Matejka – Swiss interlinguist (1902–1999)

== Footnotes ==
=== Sources ===
- Bruckner, Albert (1938). "Heinrich Nidecker". Neue Schweizer Biographie [New Swiss Biography] (in German). Basel: Buchdruckerei zum Basler Berichthaus. p. 381. LCCN 38020112. OCLC 12852017.
- Fischer, Cristophe (1961). Bericht über die Verwaltung der Öffentlichen Bibliothek der Universität Basel im Jahre 1960 (PDF) (in German). p. 2.
- Künzli, Andreas [in Esperanto] (2006). "Parto 5: Interlingue-Occidental" [Chapter 5: Interlingue-Occidental] (PDF). Universalaj lingvoj en Svislando [Universal languages in Switzerland] (in Esperanto). La Chaux-de-Fonds: Svisa Esperanto-Societo; Centre de documentation et d'étude sur la langue internationale. ISBN 978-2-9700425-2-5.
- Kürschner, Joseph, ed. (1950), "Ausgabe: 1950", Kürschners Deutscher Gelehrten-Kalender, vol. 7, De Gruyter, pp. 716–738, doi:10.1515/9783112420669-017, ISBN 978-3-11-242066-9, ISSN 1616-8399
- World biography: fourth edition of the Biographical Encyclopedia of the World. Vol. 2. New York: Institute for Research in Biography. 1948. p. 3469 – via Internet Archive.
