= Esperanto in Austria =

International auxiliary language in Austria

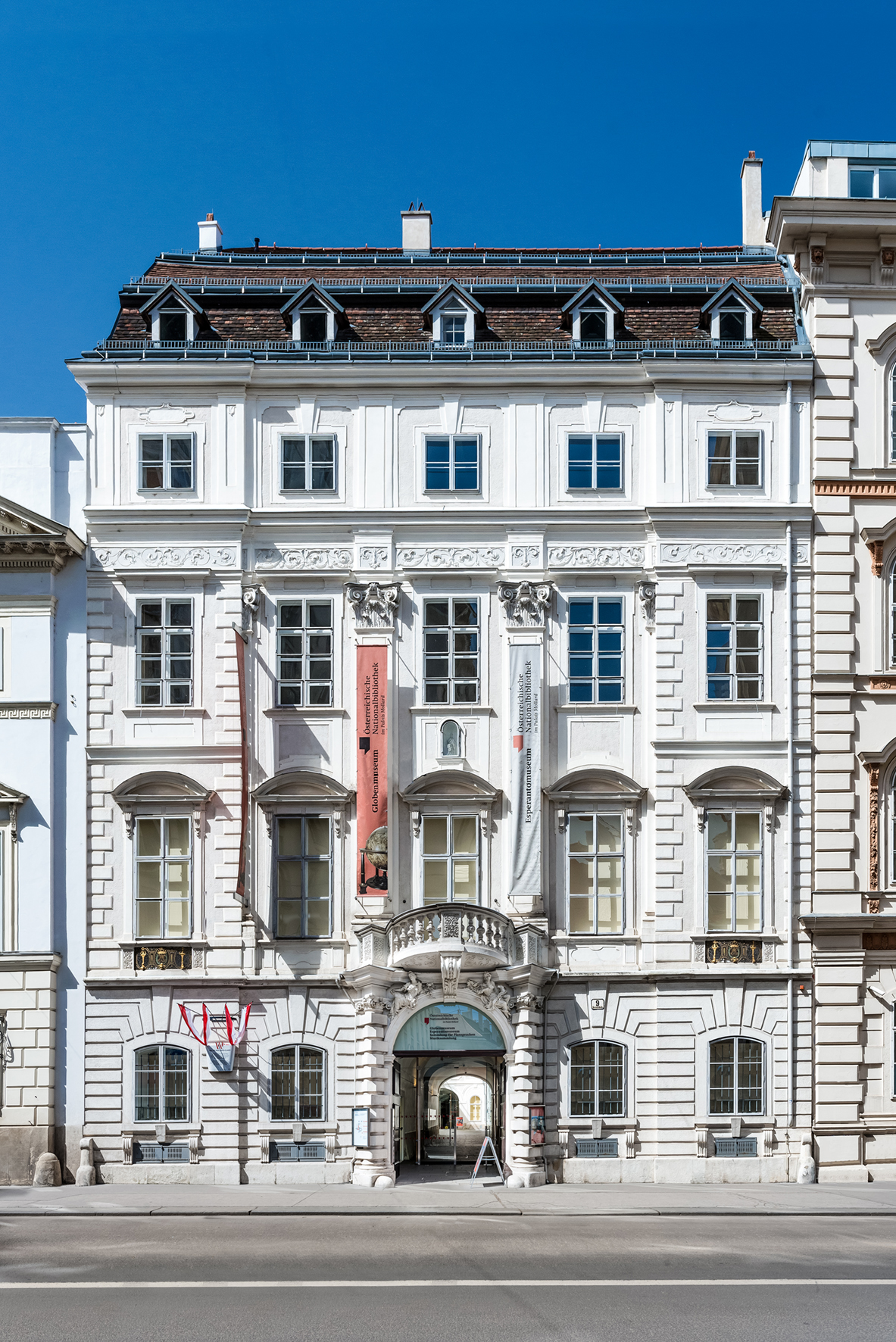
Palais Mollard-Clary, home of the Esperanto Museum in Vienna, Austria.

Austria has been the home of Esperanto speakers for most of the language's history. Esperantists were persecuted by the Nazis during the annexation of Austria in the 1930s. The President of Austria from 1965 to 1974, Franz Jonas, was an Esperantist. The Esperanto Museum and Collection of Planned Languages is located in Vienna.

In 2026, the Austrian Commission for UNESCO formally inscribed "Esperanto culture in Austria" into that country's national inventory of intangible cultural heritage.

== History ==
Esperanto spread to Austria early after its construction. Of the first thousand recorded Esperantists, 19 were located in Austria-Hungary. Only four Esperantists were recorded in the kingdom by the 1890s, though the number increased to 211 by 1904. Hans Weinhengst was an early Esperanto novelist in Austria. Austrian peace activist Alfred Hermann Fried also supported Esperanto, writing a German–Esperanto dictionary. The Esperanto Museum and Collection of Planned Languages was established in Vienna in 1927 at the behest of Felix Zamenhof, brother of Esperanto founder L. L. Zamenhof.

In the 1930s, the Esperanto movement in Austria was disproportionately made up of the workers' movement. Esperanto groups at the time included the Austrian Workers Esperantist League, the Austrian Esperanto Association, and the Austrian Esperantist Federation. The Austrian Workers Esperantist League was banned along with other workers' groups following the Austrian Civil War in 1934. In 1936, the World Esperanto Congress met in Vienna. When Austria was annexed by Nazi Germany in 1938, the Esperanto Museum was closed and the remaining Esperanto groups were disbanded. Austrian Esperantists continued meetings in private homes, but at least one such meeting resulted in the arrest of everyone present.

Austrian Esperantists such as Jenny Weleminsky and Eugen Wüster wrote translations between Esperanto and German in the mid-20th century. In 1953, the World Peace Esperantist Movement was established in Sankt Pölten. President Franz Jonas was involved in the Esperanto community prior to taking office. As president he delivered an address in Esperanto to the World Esperanto Congress in 1970.

== See also ==
- Demographics of Austria
- History of Esperanto
- Languages of Austria

== Bibliography ==
- Forster, Peter G. (1982). The Esperanto Movement. Moulton. ISBN 9789027933997.
- Lins, Ulrich (2016). Dangerous Language — Esperanto Under Hitler and Stalin. Palgrave Macmillan. ISBN 9781349715053.
- Lins, Ulrich (2017). Dangerous Language — Esperanto and the Decline of Stalinism. Palgrave Macmillan. ISBN 9781352000207.
- Sutton, Geoffrey (2008). Concise Encyclopedia of the Original Literature of Esperanto, 1887-2007. Mondial. ISBN 9781595690906.
