= Friedrich Theodor Fröhlich =

Swiss early Romantic composer

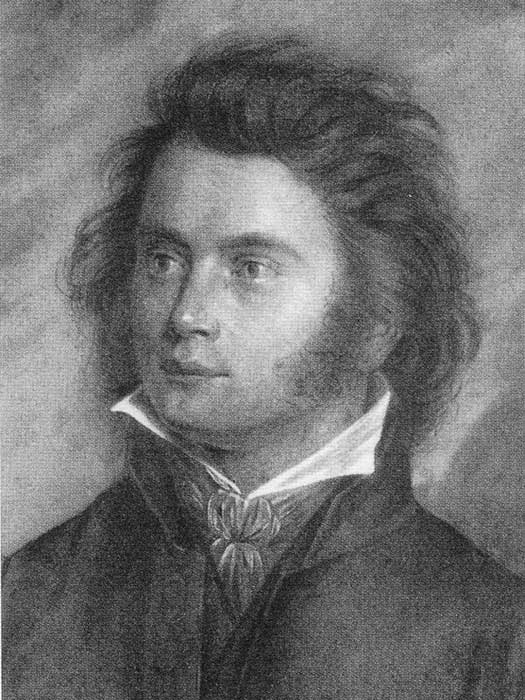

Friedrich Theodor Fröhlich (20 February 1803 – 16 October 1836) was a Swiss early Romantic composer.

== Biography ==
Friedrich Theodor Fröhlich was born in Brugg, Aargau, Switzerland, the 6th child of a Swiss family living in Brugg. His older brother Abraham Emanuel Fröhlich was a priest, writer and politician. After completing the gymnasium in Zürich, he started studying jurisprudence in Basel and later in Berlin.

In 1824 he returned to Aarau because of illness. There he took lessons in musical composition under Michael Traugott Pfeiffer. In 1826–1828 he received a grant from the cantonal government of Aargau to go to Berlin and take musical lessons from Carl Friedrich Zelter and Bernhard Klein. In Berlin he met Felix Mendelssohn Bartholdy.

In 1830 he returned to Switzerland. Although Fröhlich had minor success in Berlin, he never received any recognition or support for his art in his home town of Aarau. He struggled financially and eventually marital trouble led to depression. On 16 October 1836 he committed suicide by jumping into the river Aare.

== Works ==
His work consists of over 700 compositions, of which more than 300 were for piano and more than 300 for choir.

=== Orchestral works ===
- Overture for Dyhrn's Konradin (1827)
- Symphony in A major (1828)
- Overture B major (1832)
- Overture for a Passion in F minor (1835)

=== Chamber music ===
- Pastorale and rondo for oboe and piano (1824)
- Three sonatas for violin and piano (1826)
- Four string quartets (1826–32)
- Sonata for cello and piano in F minor (1830)
- Quintet for piano, 2 cellos and 2 horns (1833)
- Quartet for piano, violin, viola and cello (1835)
- Fantasia for violin and piano (1832)
- Fugue for string quartet (1828)

=== Piano works ===
- Sonata in A major, op. 11 (1831)
- Six elegies, op. 15 (1833)
- Waltzes and Ländler
- Piano pieces for four hands

=== Vocal music ===
- Jesus, der Kinderfreund, cantata (1834)
- Der 137. Psalm (1827)
- Canticum Simeonis (24 December 1829)
- Totenfeier (1829)
- Stabat mater (dt.) (1829)
- Weihnachtskantate (1830)
- Gesang der Geister über den Wassern (Goethe) (1831)
- Meeresstille und glückliche Fahrt (Goethe) (1831)
- Passionskantate (1831)
- Das Unser Vater (1832)
- Litany (1832)
- Wem Gott will rechte Gunst erweisen (1833)
- Preis der Liebe (1834)
- 2nd Mass (1835)
- Der 1. Psalm (1836)
- Domine, Jesu Christe (1836)
- Various pieces and Lieder for choirs of men, women and children

== Bibliography ==
- Heinrich Nidecker: Theodor Fröhlich und seine Thurgauer Bekanntschaften. In: Thurgauer Jahrbuch, Bd. 32, 1957, pp. 101–118 (online version)
- Edgar Refardt: Theodor Fröhlich, ein Schweizer Musiker der Romantik. Amerbach-Verlag, Basel 1947
- Pierre Sarbach: Friedrich Theodor Fröhlich. Winterthur 1984
- Michael Schneider: Fröhlich, (Friedrich) Theodor. In Ludwig Finscher (ed.): Die Musik in Geschichte und Gegenwart (MGG). 2nd ed., Personenteil, Band 7, Kassel Basel 2002, pp. 193–195
