= Die Friedens-Warte =

- Discipline: Political science
- Language: English, German
- Edited by: Andreas von Arnauld, Michael Staack, Pierre Thielbörger

Publication details
- History: 1899–present
- Publisher: Franz Steiner Verlag
- Frequency: Biannually

Standard abbreviations
- ISO 4: Friedens-Warte

Indexing
- ISSN: 0340-0255 (print); 2366-6714 (web)
- LCCN: 45043360
- JSTOR: 03400255
- OCLC no.: 557606905

Links
- Journal homepage; Online archive

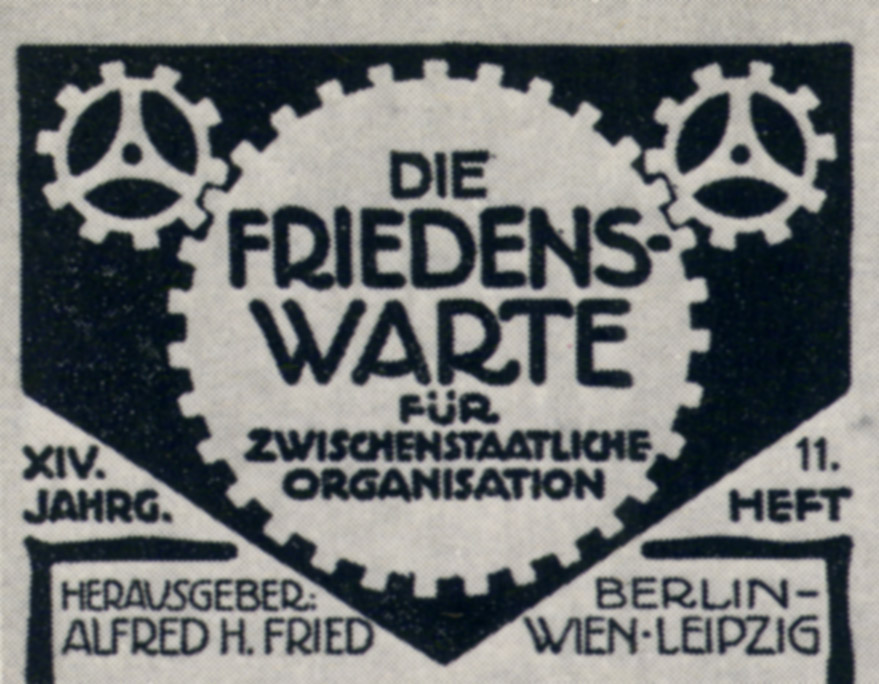
Cover of Die Friedens-Warte, German journal of Peace movement, issue 11, 1913

Die Friedens-Warte: Journal of International Peace and Organization (The Peace Watch) is a peer-reviewed academic journal covering research on international peace and organization. It was established in 1899 by Alfred Hermann Fried; publication was interrupted in 1962–74. It claims to be the oldest publication in the German-speaking world dedicated to peacekeeping and international organization.

== History and significance ==
The journal was established during a time of growing international tensions, just before the outbreak of World War I. It moved to Switzerland during the First World War and after Hitler came to power. Hans Wehburg was the editor in 1924–62, and the journal lapsed after his death, being revived by Jost Delbrück in 1974, with volume 57.

== Content and focus ==
The journal publishes articles in both German and English, including contributions from disciplines including political science, law, economics, sociology, social psychology, and social anthropology. It claims to offer a platform for both scholarly exchange and practical application of peace-building expertise.

== Publication details ==
The journal is published biannually as double issues. It is indexed in Google Scholar and International Political Science Abstracts.

== Impact and recognition ==
Norman Angell described the journal as "the most efficient periodical of the Pacifist movement in the world".
