= Esperanto library =

Library with an important collection of books in Esperanto

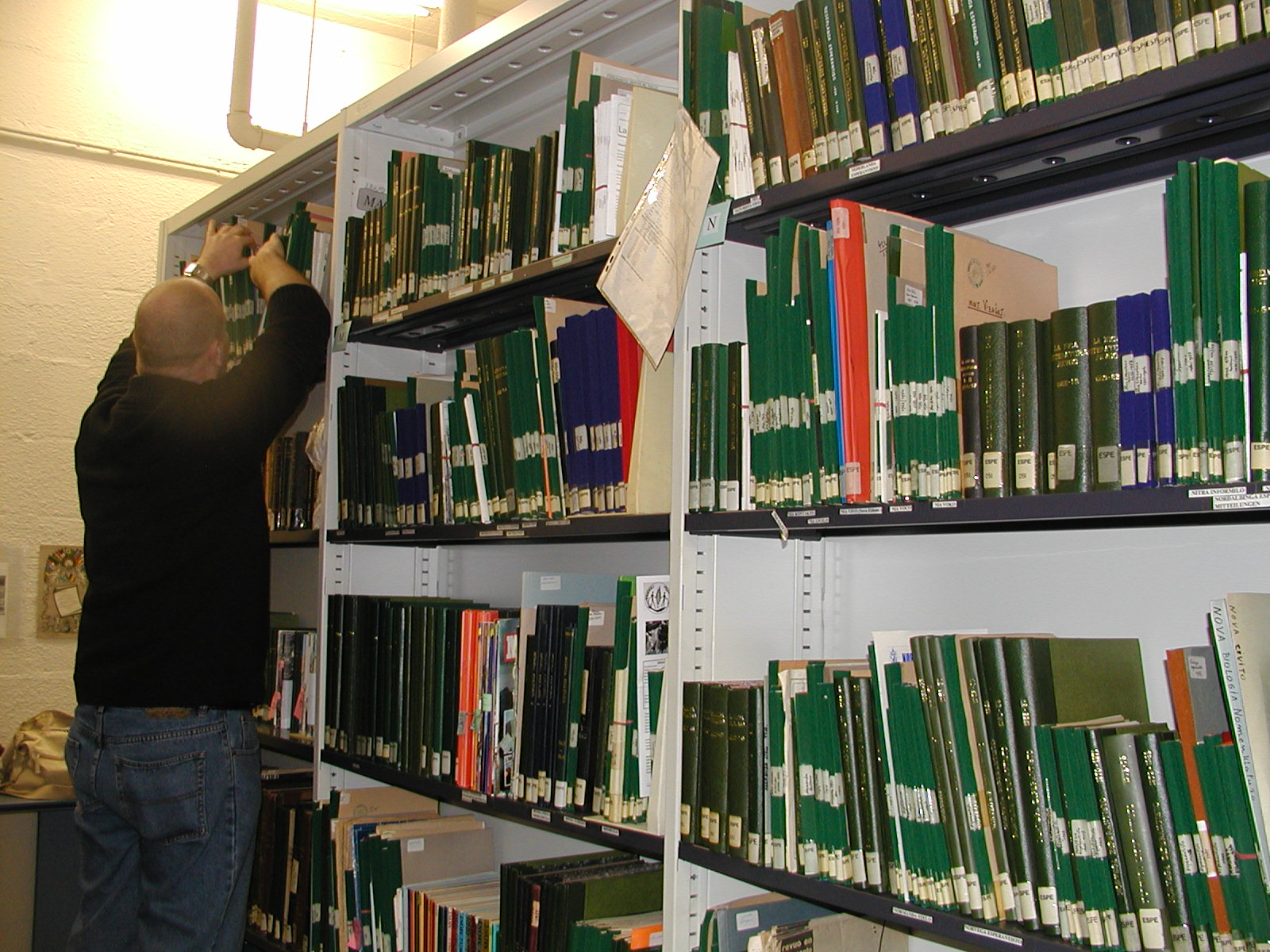
The Esperanto-Fondaĵo Cesar Vanbiervliet was one of the largest Esperanto collections in the world, housed in the city library of Kortrijk, Belgium.

The following Esperanto libraries and collections of works in the Esperanto language are worthy of note:

- The Montagu Butler Library of Esperanto materials, maintained by the Esperanto Association of Britain. This holds some 12,500 books as well as a documentary archive, a photo archive, audio-visual materials and various artefacts. An online catalogue is under construction.
- The Austrian National Library in Vienna, holds the world's largest collection of research materials on Esperanto and planned languages. It includes an International Esperanto Museum with 35,000 volumes, 3,000 museum objects, 5,000 autographs and manuscripts, 22,000 photos, 1,200 posters and 40,000 flyers. In 1995, a project was started to put the catalog online. The database, known as Trovanto, can be searched from the website of the Austrian National Library.
- The Universala Esperanto-Asocio, which maintains the Hector Hodler Library in Rotterdam, Netherlands. The Hodler collection contains around 20,000 books and a vast collection of periodicals.
- The Center for Documentation and Exploration of the International Language, in La Chaux-de-Fonds, Switzerland, founded in 1967. It is part of the City Library and contains more than 20,000 bibliographical units.
- The International Museum of Peace and Solidarity in Samarkand, Uzbekistan, founded in 1986 and handled by the International Friendship Club. The museum's goal is to advance peace and world consciousness. The museum exhibits around 20,000 books, pieces of art, and memorabilia from 100 countries.
- The Spanish Esperanto Museum, in San Pablo de Ordal, Spain, which began in 1963 when Mr. L. M. Hernandez Yzal began systematically collecting Esperanto publications. It grew into a museum which opened in 1968. In 1993, the computer catalog listed 8400 books and 12,315 yearly bound books of 2485 periodicals.
- The German Esperanto Library, in Aalen, Germany, which has a collection of more than 11,000 pieces.
- Hendrik Conscience Heritage Library (Erfgoedbibliotheek H. Conscience) in Belgium has a legally preserved collection of 10,000 books and periodicals, mainly from the Foundation Cesar Vanbiervliet in Kortrijk.
- National Library of Foreign Literature in Budapest houses the largest Esperanto-language private collection of Europe, the legacy of Károly Fajszi in Budapest, who started collecting in the 1970s. In 1991, a catalog of the collection was published which had 542 pages.
- The National Esperanto Library and Archive in Massa, Italy, founded in 1972 as the library of the Italian Esperanto Federation. In 1994, the 7250 volume collection was made part of the National Archive of Massa and opened to the public.
- The National Esperanto Museum in Gray, France. The museum is a public archive with a permanent Esperanto exhibition.
- The George Alan Connor Esperanto Collection at the University of Oregon in Eugene, Oregon includes many titles, catalogued in its bibliographic guide, Catalog of the George Alan Connor Esperanto Collection (1978).
- The University of South Florida-Tampa Special Collections Department also houses a large collection of early Esperantist publications, including the first Esperanto edition of Karel Čapek's R.U.R. (1926) and early publications of the Sennacieca Asocio Tutmonda (SAT).
- The Allan C. Boschen Esperanto Collection, established in 2015 at the W.E.B. Du Bois Special Collections and University Archives, at the University of Massachusetts-Amherst, began with 18 linear feet of books and publications and is actively soliciting contributions.

== See also ==
- Department of Planned Languages and Esperanto Museum (in Vienna in Austria)
- List of Esperanto periodicals
