= André Schild =

Swiss linguist (1910–1981)

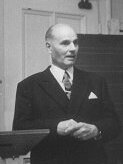
- Schild in 1971
- Born: Philippe-André Schild; August 1, 1901; Fontainemelon, Neuchâtel, Switzerland
- Died: July 13, 1981 (aged 70); Basel, Switzerland
- Occupation(s): Teacher, interlinguist
- Notable work: Neolatino

Phiippe-André Schild (1 August 1910 - 13 July 1981) was a Swiss linguist known for his work with international auxiliary languages, especially Interlingua.

== Life ==
Schild was born on 1 August 1910 in Fontainemelon in the Swiss canton of Neuchâtel. He joined his local Esperantic club in 1925 aged 15, having become interested in the idea of a universal language at a young age. From 1939 to 1940 he was leader of the Esperanto group of Basel, where he had settled in 1929 to work in a Singer sewing machine factory. While he worked there, he also worked as a teacher of German in a private school.

After coming to the conclusion that Esperanto lacked naturalism, he left the movement to join Edgar de Wahl's Occidental; he supported it until 1947, when he proposed his own, again more naturalistic, language. This project, Neolatino, attempted to combine the internationality of Romance roots, while maintaining a grammar that was as regular as possible. However, upon realising that his project had little chance of success, he aligned himself with the Interlingua of the International Auxiliary Language Association.

Schild thus became an important figure in the international language movement – in 1954, he founded the Union Mundial pro Interlingua with French unionist Jean Thersant and British educationalist Donald Morewood; he was its first general secretary from 1955 to 1958. Schild published in interlinguistic newspapers, and organised congresses for supporters of Interlingua. Schild spoke Interlingua with a native-like proficiency, and from 1960 began compiling a German-Interlingua dictionary (Wörterbuch Deutsch-Interlingua) – this took him over two decades, and he died only a few pages from its completion (Schild died at the word zuschanden, to shame). Schild died on 13 July 1981 in the University Hospital of Basel after a long period of illness. His dictionary was completed posthumously by Heimut E. Ruhrig of the University of Freiburg and published the same year. Schild's library and archives – over 400 kg of interlinguistics-related material – were donated to the Centre de documentation et d'étude sur la langue internationale in La Chaux-de-Fonds.
