= State Archives of Massa =

State archival institution in Massa, Italy

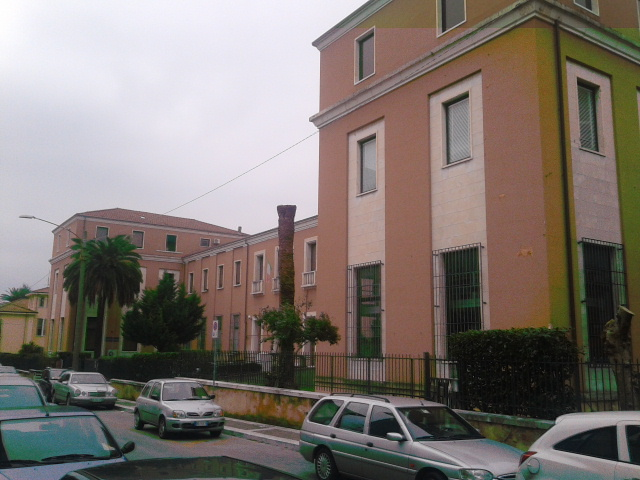
- Interactive map of State Archives of Massa
- 44°02′15″N 10°08′17″E
- Location: Massa, Tuscany, Italy
- Type: State archive
- Established: 13 February 1887
- Website: http://www.archiviodistatomassa.cultura.gov.it

The State Archives of Massa (Italian: Archivio di Stato di Massa) is a state archive located in Massa, Tuscany, Italy. It preserves historical records produced by public institutions and administrations in the territory of Massa-Carrara and the historical region of Lunigiana.

The archive was established by royal decree on 13 February 1887 following the efforts of the historian and archivist Giovanni Sforza. Its collections include documents from pre-unification governmental archives and other historically significant records relating to the political and administrative history of the region. Among its most important holdings is the Ducal Archive, which preserves documentation concerning the historical affairs of the Duchy of Massa and Carrara.

== Sources ==
- Raffo Maggini, Olga. L'Archivio di Stato di Massa ed il suo patrimonio documentario ad un secolo dalla sua fondazione. Massa, 1987.
- Benedetti, Amedeo. "Contributo alla vita di Giovanni Sforza". Atti e Memorie della Deputazione di storia patria per le antiche provincie modenesi, series XI, vol. XXXIII (2011), pp. 301–333.

== See also ==
- National Esperanto Library and Archive
