= National Esperanto Library and Archive =

- Biblioteca Nazionale di Esperanto
- 44.03760456853333°N 10.138329695781541°E
- Location: Massa, Italy
- Established: 1972

Collection
- Size: 9,049 item (2021), 9,730 item (2022), 9,704 volume

Other information
- Website: http://www.archiviodistatomassa.beniculturali.it/index.php?it/186/biblioteca-nazionale-di-esperanto

The Esperanto National Library and Archive is the biggest Esperanto library in Italy; it is located in Massa, in northern Tuscany.

Founded in 1972 as the official library of the Federazione esperantista italiana, it is now a public collection, hosted by the State Archives of Massa and part of the REPROBI network of Italian libraries.

== History ==
The concept of a national library that could host all the literary works in Esperanto was first imagined in the 1950s by professor Mario Dazzini (Pietrasanta, 1910 – Massa, 1985) and his sister, Catina Dazzini.

The first collection began in 1972, when Dazzini received a rare Esperanto book (the first grammar of Esperanto ever published in Italy, written by Daniele Marignoni). The book was donated by the Italian linguist Bruno Migliorini and his brother Elio Migliorini, a geographer.

The core of the library consisted not only of books provided by the Migliorinis, but also of works donated by a lawyer Boscarino from Ragusa, Corrado Grazzini, Luigi Minnaja, and other Italian Esperantists.

The library was first hosted in the Malaspina Castle, on the hills surrounding Massa, and was then moved to the building of the State Archive in Massa.

In March 1994, the library and its archive were donated to the state and to the archive administration of the Italian Ministry of Culture.

In January 2007, the local Esperanto group in Massa began to catalogue the books and works hosted by the library. The work was helped and financed by the province of Massa-Carrara, together with the regional government of Tuscany and the Massa State Archive. The inauguration of the library's new location in the building of the State Archive was celebrated on 25 October 2008 in a public conference, called "Dall'Esperanto storico al multimediale" ("From historical to multimedial Esperanto"), hosted in the Sala della Resistenza of the Ducal Palace of Massa.

== Collection ==
The library hosts books written in or related to Esperanto; the books mainly deal with linguistics, literature, theology and politics. Overall, the library hosts around 8,000 books. The majority of them were donated by the Dazzini family, and later by other Italian Esperantists.

The collection includes 176 magazines, not yet catalogued, as well as other documents such as travel diaries, correspondence, photographic images and music recordings. About half of the collection is Esperanto translations of works of prose and poetry.

== Bibliography ==
- Amedeo Benedetti, L'Esperanto e la Biblioteca Nazionale di Massa, in Charta, n. 97, May–June 2008, pp. 60–63.
