= Alfred Hermann Fried =

Austrian Jewish pacifist and publicist (1864–1921)

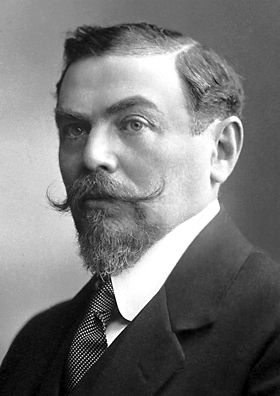
- Born: 11 November 1864; Vienna, Austrian Empire
- Died: 5 May 1921 (aged 56); Vienna, Austria

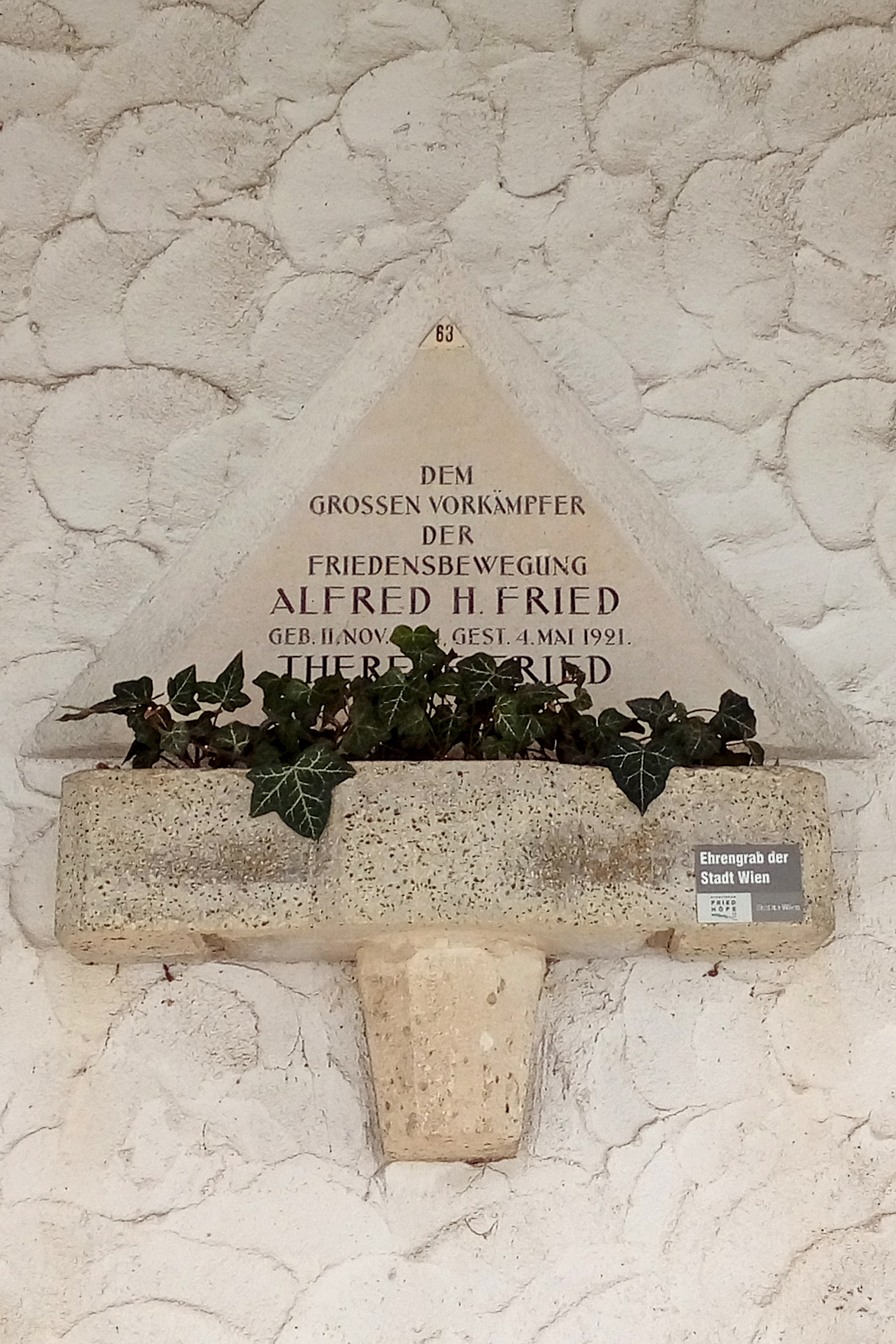
Feuerhalle Simmering, grave of Alfred Hermann Fried

Alfred Hermann Fried (Austrian German: [ˈalfreːd ˈhɛʁman ˈfriːd]; 11 November 1864 – 4 May 1921) was an Austrian Jewish pacifist, publicist, journalist, co-founder of the German peace movement, and winner (with Tobias Asser) of the Nobel Peace Prize in 1911. Fried was also a supporter of Esperanto. He is the author of an Esperanto textbook and an Esperanto–German and German–Esperanto dictionary, first published in 1903 and republished in 1905.

== Life ==
Born in Vienna, Austrian Empire, Fried left school at the age of 15 and started to work in a bookshop. In 1883, he moved to Berlin, where he opened a bookshop of his own in 1887. Following the publication by Bertha von Suttner of Die Waffen nieder! (Lay Down Your Arms) in 1889, he and von Suttner began in 1892 to print a magazine of the same name. In articles published within Die Waffen nieder! and its successor, Die Friedenswarte (The Peace Watch), he articulated his pacifist philosophy.

In 1892 he was a co-founder of the German Peace Society (Deutsche Friedensgesellschaft). He was one of the fathers of the idea of a modern organisation to assure worldwide peace (the principal idea was developed in the League of Nations and after the Second World War in the UN).

Fried was a prominent member of the Esperanto movement. In 1903 he published the book Lehrbuch der internationalen Hilfssprache Esperanto (Textbook of the International Auxiliary Language Esperanto).

In 1909 he collaborated with Paul Otlet and Henri La Fontaine of the Central Office of International Associations in the preparation of the Annuaire de la Vie Internationale.

In 1911 he received the Nobel Peace Prize together with Tobias Asser.

During World War I, Fried moved to neutral Switzerland, and continued to advocate international peace. He died in his hometown, Vienna, in 1921. His ashes are buried at Feuerhalle Simmering.

== Works ==
- Das Abrüstungs-Problem: Eine Untersuchung. Berlin, Gutman, 1904.
- Abschied von Wien
- The German Emperor and the Peace of the World, with a Preface by Norman Angell. London, Hodder & Stoughton, 1912.
- Die Grundlagen des revolutionären Pacifismus. Tübingen, Mohr, 1908. Translated into French by Jean Lagorgette as Les Bases du pacifisme: Le Pacifisme réformiste et le pacifisme «révolutionnaire». Paris, Pedone, 1909.
- Handbuch der Friedensbewegung. (Handbook of the Peace Movement) Wien, Oesterreichische Friedensgesellschaft, 1905. 2nd ed., Leipzig, Verlag der «Friedens-Warte», 1911.
- Die Grundlagen des ursächlichen pazifismus. Zürich, Art. Institut Orell Füssli, 1916.
- «Intellectual Starvation in Germany and Austria», in Nation, 110 (March 20, 1920) 367–368.
- International Cooperation. Newcastle upon Tyne, Richardson [1918].
- Das internationale Leben der Gegenwart. Leipzig, Teubner, 1908.
- «The League of Nations: An Ethical Institution», in Living Age, 306 (August 21, 1920) 440–443.
- Mein Kriegstagebuch. (My War Journal) 4 Bde. Zürich, Rascher, 1918–1920.
- Pan-Amerika. Zürich, Orell-Füssli, 1910.
- The Restoration of Europe, transl. by Lewis Stiles Gannett. New York, Macmillan, 1916.
- Der Weltprotest gegen den versailler Frieden. Leipzig, Verlag der Neue Geist, 1920.
- Die zweite Haager Konferenz: Ihre Arbeiten, ihre Ergebnisse, und ihre Bedeutung. Leipzig, Nachfolger [1908].

Esperanto textbook and vocabulary

- Wörterbuch Esperanto-Deutsch und Deutsch-Esperanto
- Lehrbuch der internationalen Hilfssprache “Esperanto” mit Wörterbuch in Esperanto-Deutsch und Deutsch-Esperanto, Berlin-Schönberg: Esperanto-Verlag, 1903 pr. Pass & Garleb, Berlin 18x12cm II, 120p.
  - 2nd edition: Stuttgart: Franckhsche Verlagshandlung, 1905 18x12cm 91, 5p.
  - 3rd edition: Stuttgart: Franckhsche Verlagshandlung, 1905 18x12cm 91p.

== See also ==
- List of Jewish Nobel laureates
- List of peace activists
- List of Austrian Jews
- List of Austrian writers
