= The Life of Zamenhof =

Biography of L. L. Zamenhof by Edmond Privat

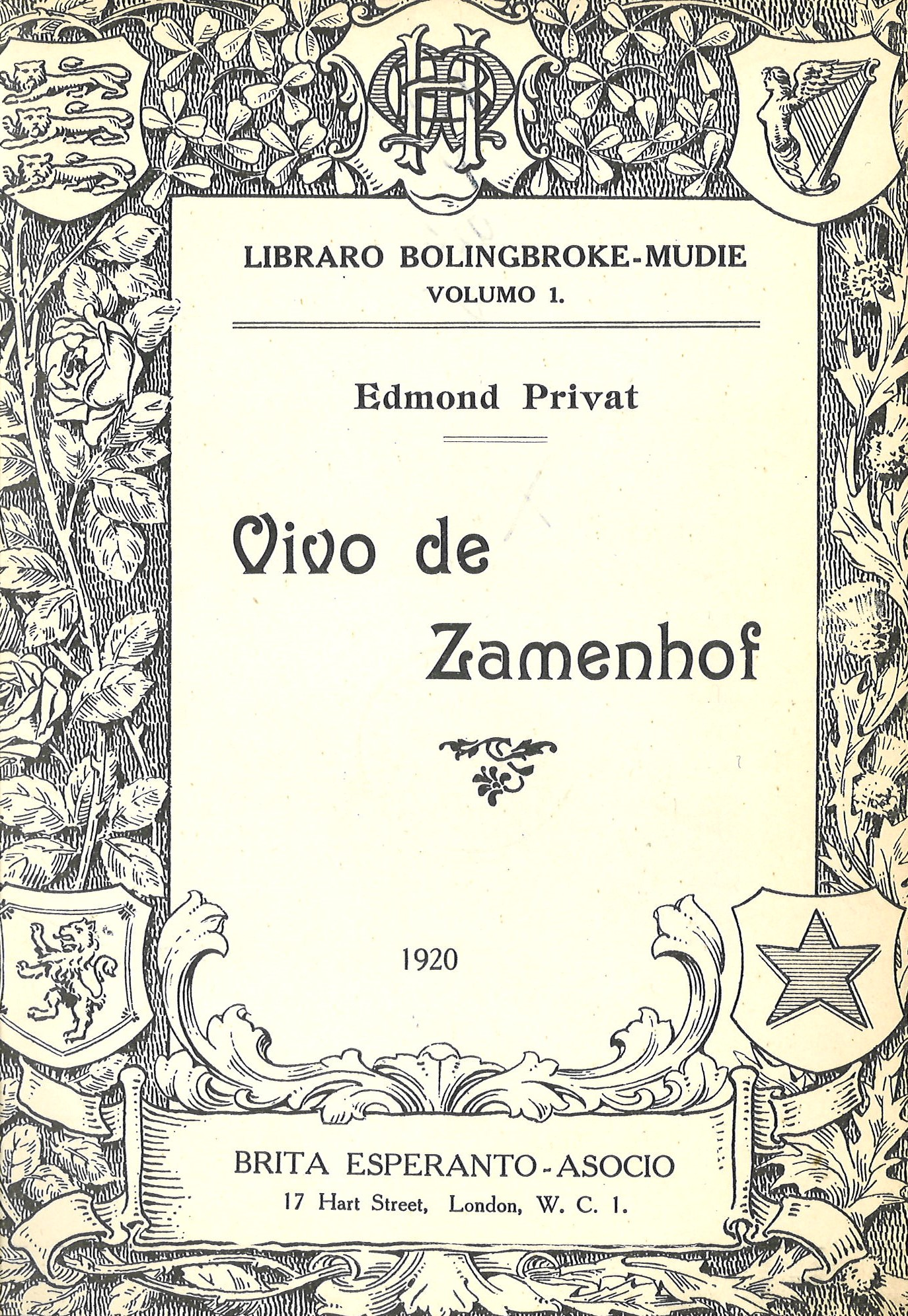
- Front cover of the 1920 edition of the book
- Author: Edmond Privat
- Original title: Vivo de Zamenhof
- Language: Esperanto
- Subject: L. L. Zamenhof
- Genre: Biography
- Publication date: 1920
- Pages: 208

The Life of Zamenhof (Esperanto: Vivo de Zamenhof) is a biography of L. L. Zamenhof, the founder of Esperanto, written in Esperanto by Edmond Privat. The first edition was in 1920 with 208 pages, and the second edition was in 1923 with 109 pages. Titles of the chapters in the English translation by Ralph Eliott: The Peoples of Lithuania; A Child in Bielostok; A Schoolboy in Warsaw; Student Years; Doktoro Esperanto; A Prophet of Idealism; "Homarano"; Congress Speeches; The Linguist; The Writer; The Ethical Thinker; Approach of Death. "The master, already dead, with a living spirit is among us and to be intimately acquainted with this spirit, the most humane in the last century, the faithful disciple introduces it to us through masterful eloquence in his work." (Jobo, L M 1922, page 20). Appeared in English (1931) and Dutch (1934) translations.

== Photographs ==
The English version of the book is supplied with many black-and-white photographs, most of them of full-page size.

- (unnumbered page 4) a portrait of Zamenhof, captioned by his signature "L. L. Zamenhof"
- (unnumbered page 10) The market place of Bielostok.
- (unnumbered page 11) Zielona Street in Bielostok, where Zamenhof was born.
- (unnumbered page 12) The birthplace of Zamenhof.
- (page 124) The schoolboy Zamenhof, 14 years old. (Second from left, standing)
- (page 125) The "First Book", German edition, 1887.
- (page 126) (11 small photographs) Zamenhof's parents (in center) and their children (left to right): Ludoviko, Sara, Fani, Augusta, Felikso, Henriko, Leono, Aleksando, Ida.
- (page 127) (2 elliptical photographs) The wedding picture, 9 August 1887.
- (page 128) Zamenhof with the medal of the Legion of Honour.
- (page 129) Zamenhof and Michaux, the organizer of the Congress.
- (page 130) Participants at the First Esperanto Congress.
- (page 131) On the ship "Onward" departing for England, Aug. 10, 1905. Edmond Privat is standing behind Zamenhof.
- (page 132) Warsaw, the street Dzika, in which Zamenhof lived 1897–1915. (In 1931 this street was renamed Zamenhof Street.)
- (page 133) Zamenhof's study in 9 Dzika Street.
- (page 134) A letter of Zamenhof.
- (page 135) Zamenhof and wife on ship, Dresden, 1908.
- (page 136) Zamenhof and wife at the grave of President Washington, 1910.
- (page 137) Zamenhof in Antwerpen, 1911. [On the bottom of the photograph itself, is the text: "18. — Veturado al la oficiala akcepto de la Urbestraro." Translation: Journey to the official reception of the Municipality.]
- (page 138) Zamenhof and wife with some Esperantists.
- (page 139) The funeral of Zamenhof, April 16, 1917.
- (page 140) The tombstone.
- (page 141) Zamenhof's bust by Mr. Kodet, 1921.
- (page 144) The Bible in Esperanto translation.
- (page 145) Zamenhof monument in Belo Horizonte, Brazil.
- (page 146) (6 small photographs) An international currency was coined, 1959, by the Netherlands State Mint. [showing obverse and reverse views of coins of 1 stelo, 5 steloj, and 10 steloj]
- (page 147) Also, since 1959, the Polish ship Zamenhof cruises the oceans of the world.
- (page 148) Poststamps honoring Zamenhof from Brazil (1945, 1959), Hungary (1957), Poland (1959), Russia (1927) and Bulgaria (1957, 1959).
- (page 149) One of the 130 streets in the world named after Esperanto or its author. (Esperantists from Trois-Rivières, Canada before the street sign, 1962)
