= Edmond Privat =

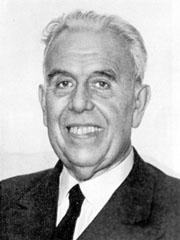
Edmond Privat 1950ca

Edmond Privat (17 August 1889 – 28 August 1962) was a Francophone Swiss Esperantist. A historian, university professor, author, journalist and peace activist, he was a graduate of the University of Geneva and a lecturer for the World Peace Foundation. His collective works consist of original dramas, poems, stories, textbooks and books about the Esperanto movement.

== Esperanto activity ==
Having already learned Esperanto in childhood, Privat and fellow student Hector Hodler founded in 1903 the journal Juna Esperantisto (The Young Esperantist). Though still an adolescent in 1905, he walked 600 kilometres to participate in the first World Congress of Esperanto in Boulogne-sur-Mer, France, where he spoke with mature eloquence.

At the 1907 International Socialist Congress, Privat advocated the use of Esperanto by the International Socialist Bureau in Brussels. Privat served as a committee member of the World Esperanto Association (Esperanto: UEA: Universala Esperanto-Asocio) beginning in 1912. From 1920 until 1934, he was editor-in-chief of Esperanto's eponymous official magazine. From 1924 until 1938 he was president of the UEA and at the same time president of the International Central Committee. He resigned after a scandal. Privat advanced the international Esperanto organization inside and outside UEA.

His works History of the Esperanto language (in two volumes) and The Life of Zamenhof made him one of the most important historians of Esperanto. As the first historian of Esperanto and Zamenhof's first biographer, he used his connections within Swiss academia to further Esperanto. He authored a linguistic study Esprimo de sentoj en Esperanto (Expression of feelings in Esperanto), is the author of the lyrical Ginevra and of the poem anthology Tra l'silento (Through the Silence). Also, he wrote books teaching Esperanto, Karlo and Course Reader.

During the years 1923–1926, Privat was a vice-delegate of Iran at the League of Nations. He presented Esperanto at the League of Nations, at the International Labour Organization (ILO) and at the Universal Telegraph Union. He arranged many international conferences about Esperanto instruction in Geneva (1922). He became a Quaker in 1936. His work "Sagesse de l'Orient au dela des Religions", published around 1945, highlights different world religions and spiritual movements, including his appreciation of Gandhi.

=== Selected works ===
- Esperanto at a Glance (1908)
- Esperanto in Fifty Lessons (1908)
- Karlo (reading book, 1909)
- At the Heart of Europe (brochure, 1909)
- A Living Language of a Living People (1910)
- About Esperanto Literature (1912)
- The Last Kiss (1912)
- Through the Silence (original poems), 1912)
- Ginevra (original drama-legend in verse, 1913)
- Course reader (1913)
- History of the Esperanto Language (two volumes, 1912, 1927)
- The Life of Zamenhof (1920)
- Expression of Senses in Esperanto (1931) linguistic study
- Conduct between Peoples (philosophy, 1934) psychological study of international problems
- Aux Indes avec Gandhi 1934
- Le Chancelier Décapité: St. Thomas More. (1935)
- Les Anglais, des pirates aux Prophètes (1939)
- Sagesse de l'Orient au dela des Religions (spirituality, 1945)
- Federal Experience (1958)
- Collective Works of Youth (1960) (includes Through the Silence)
- Adventures of a Pioneer (1963) amusing stories about serious encounters and events
- Life of Gandhi (1967)
- Two Speeches

== Sources ==
- The Esperanto Book: Appendix 4. Online. September 18, 2007.
- Esperanto Introduction. Online. September 18, 2007.
- Forster, Peter Glover. The Esperanto Movement @ Google Books. Online. September 18, 2007.
- Matthias, Ulrich. Esperanto - The New Latin for the Church and for Ecumenism @ Esperanto - The New Latin for the Church and for Ecumenism. Online September 18, 2007.
- Weekly Worker 409 Thursday November 22 2001. Online. September 18, 2007.
