= Vyškovec =

- Municipality
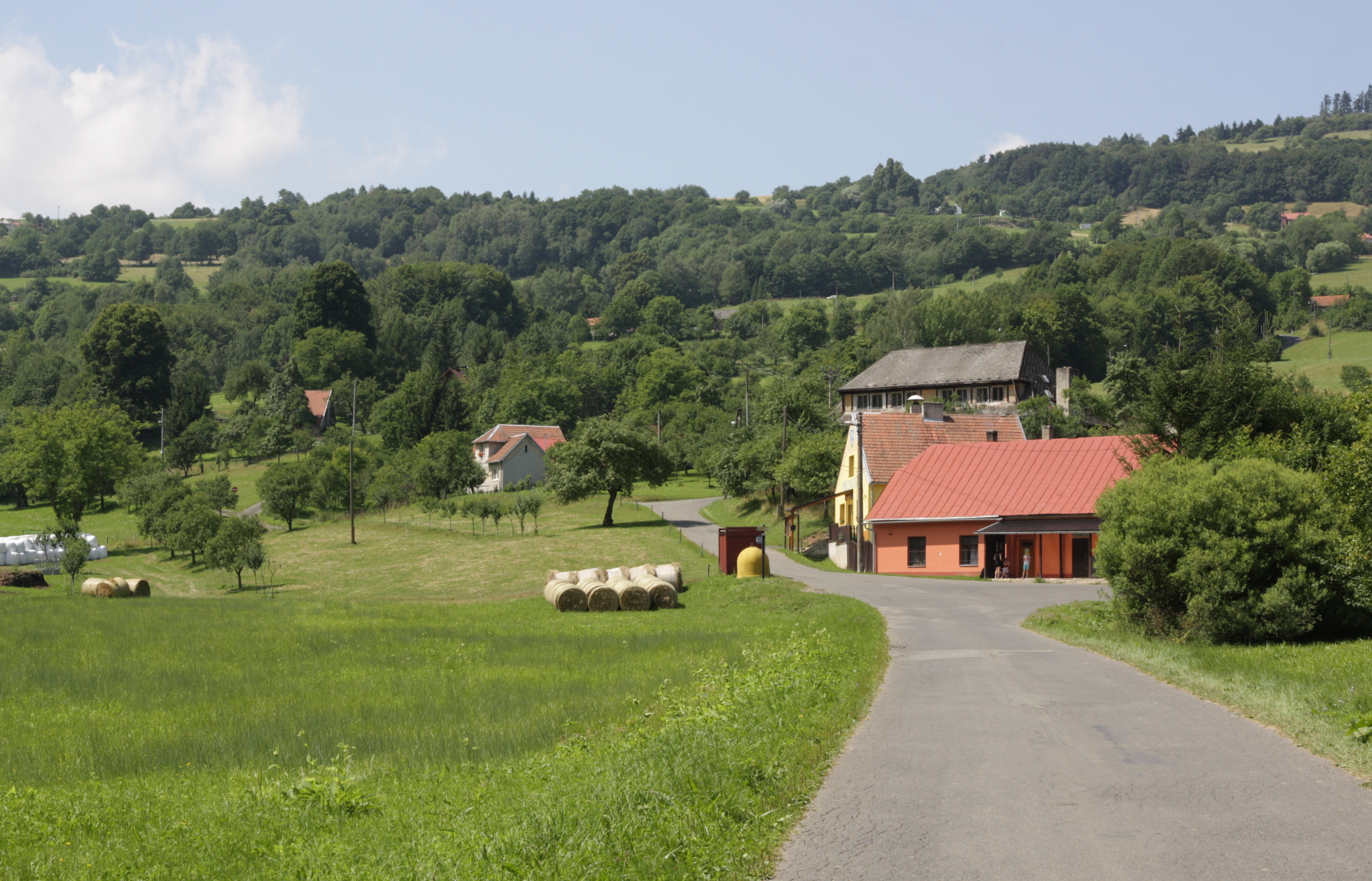
- Centre of Vyškovec

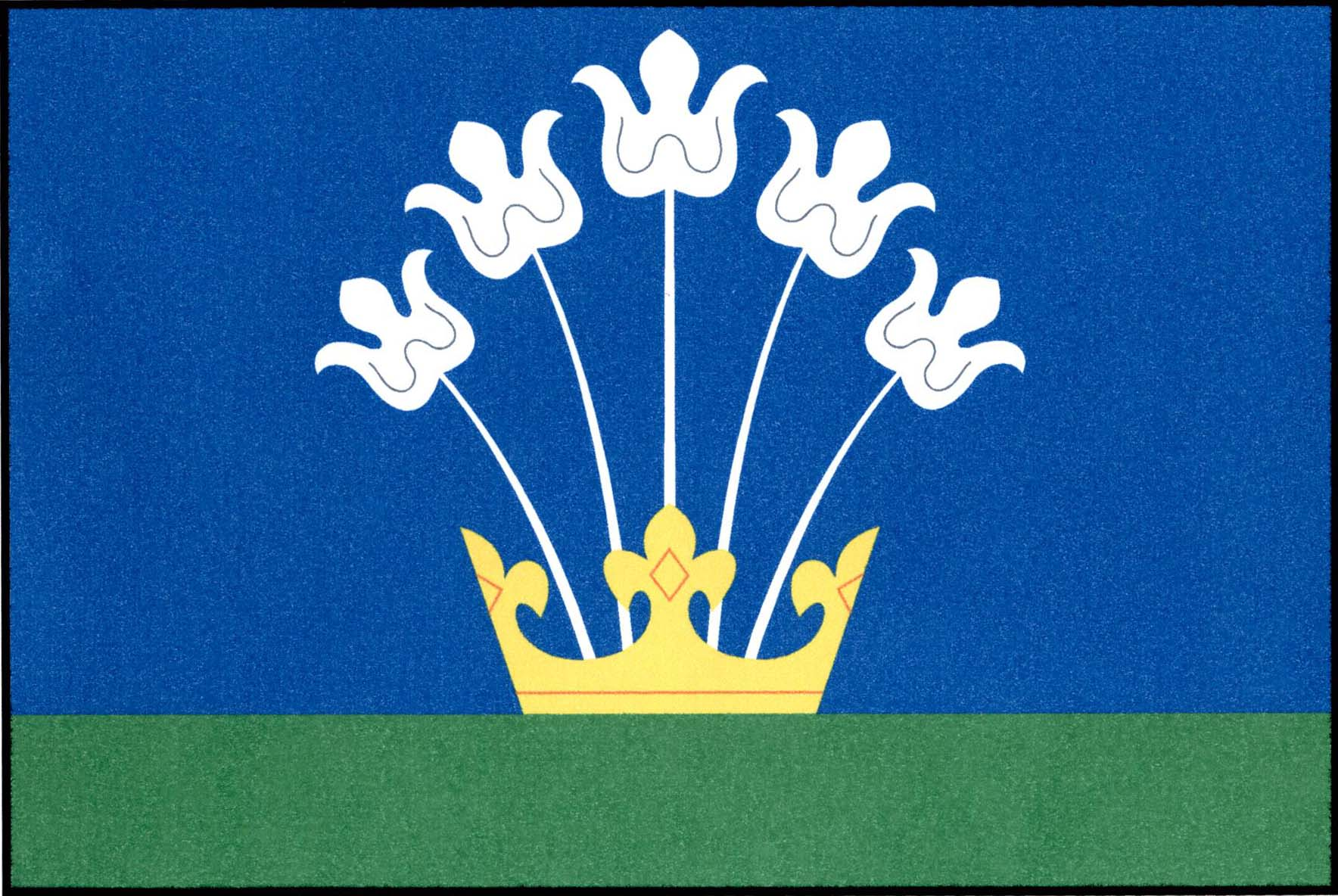
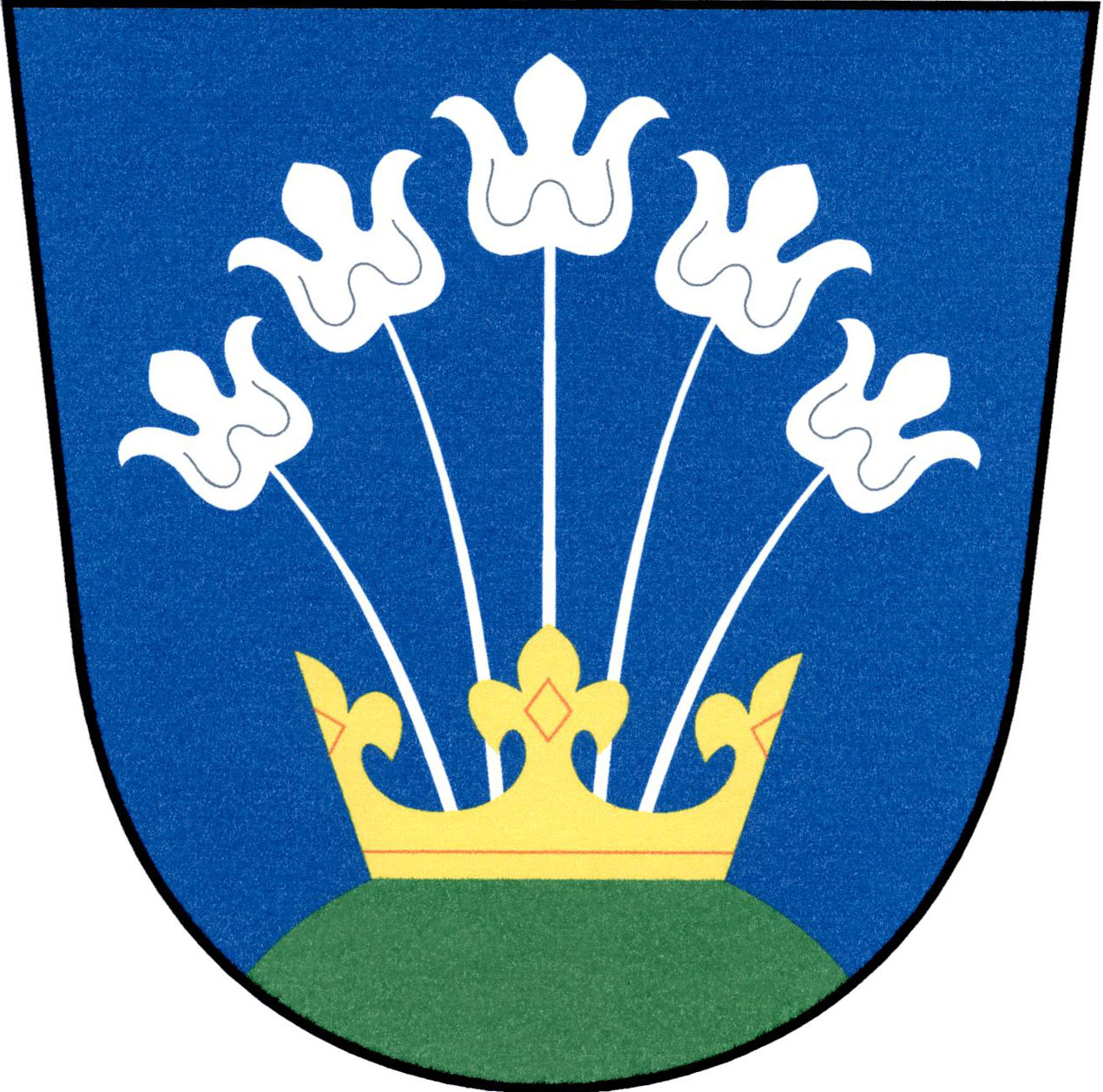
- Flag Coat of arms

- Location in the Czech Republic
- Coordinates: 48°56′26″N 17°51′9″E
- Country: Czech Republic
- Region: Zlín
- District: Uherské Hradiště
- First mentioned: 1830

Area
  - Total: 11.17 km^{2} (4.31 sq mi)
- Elevation: 510 m (1,670 ft)

Population (2026-01-01)
  - Total: 187
  - Density: 16.7/km^{2} (43.4/sq mi)
- Time zone: UTC+1 (CET)
  - Summer (DST): UTC+2 (CEST)
- Postal code: 687 74
- Website: www.vyskovec.cz

Vyškovec is a municipality and village in Uherské Hradiště District in the Zlín Region of the Czech Republic. It has about 200 inhabitants.

Vyškovec lies approximately 32 kilometres (20 mi) south-east of Uherské Hradiště, 36 km (22 mi) south of Zlín, and 279 km (173 mi) south-east of Prague.

== Demographics ==
Historical population
Year	Pop.	±%
1869	568	—
1880	605	+6.5%
1890	602	−0.5%
1900	643	+6.8%
1910	740	+15.1%
1921	714	−3.5%
1930	794	+11.2%
1950	715	−9.9%
1961	662	−7.4%
1970	532	−19.6%
1980	324	−39.1%
1991	201	−38.0%
2001	171	−14.9%
2011	129	−24.6%
2021	153	+18.6%
Source: Censuses
