= Montagu C. Butler Library =

English collection dedicated to the Esperanto language

- 52.9429755797999°N 2.1633073482097824°W
- Location: Stoke-on-Trent, England

The Montagu Butler Library is one of the most comprehensive collections dedicated to the Esperanto language. Housing an extensive array of literary works, historical documents, and scholarly resources, located at the Esperanto Association of Britain.

It is named after Montagu C. Butler, author of a number of works including Step by Step in Esperanto and the comprehensive Esperanto-English Dictionary.

The collections started with Butler's personal collection and the library of the Esperanto Association of Britain.

It is housed in purpose-built premises at the offices of the Esperanto Association of Britain which are now located at the Wedgwood Memorial College, Barlaston, Stoke-on-Trent, Staffordshire, having moved from Holland Park, London in April 2001 due to financial pressures.

== Collections ==
The library collects Esperanto literature, writings about Interlinguistics, and archival materials related to the history of Esperanto. There are approximately 13000 books in its collection; there are also other materials.

== See also ==
- Esperanto library
