= Centre de documentation et d'étude sur la langue internationale =

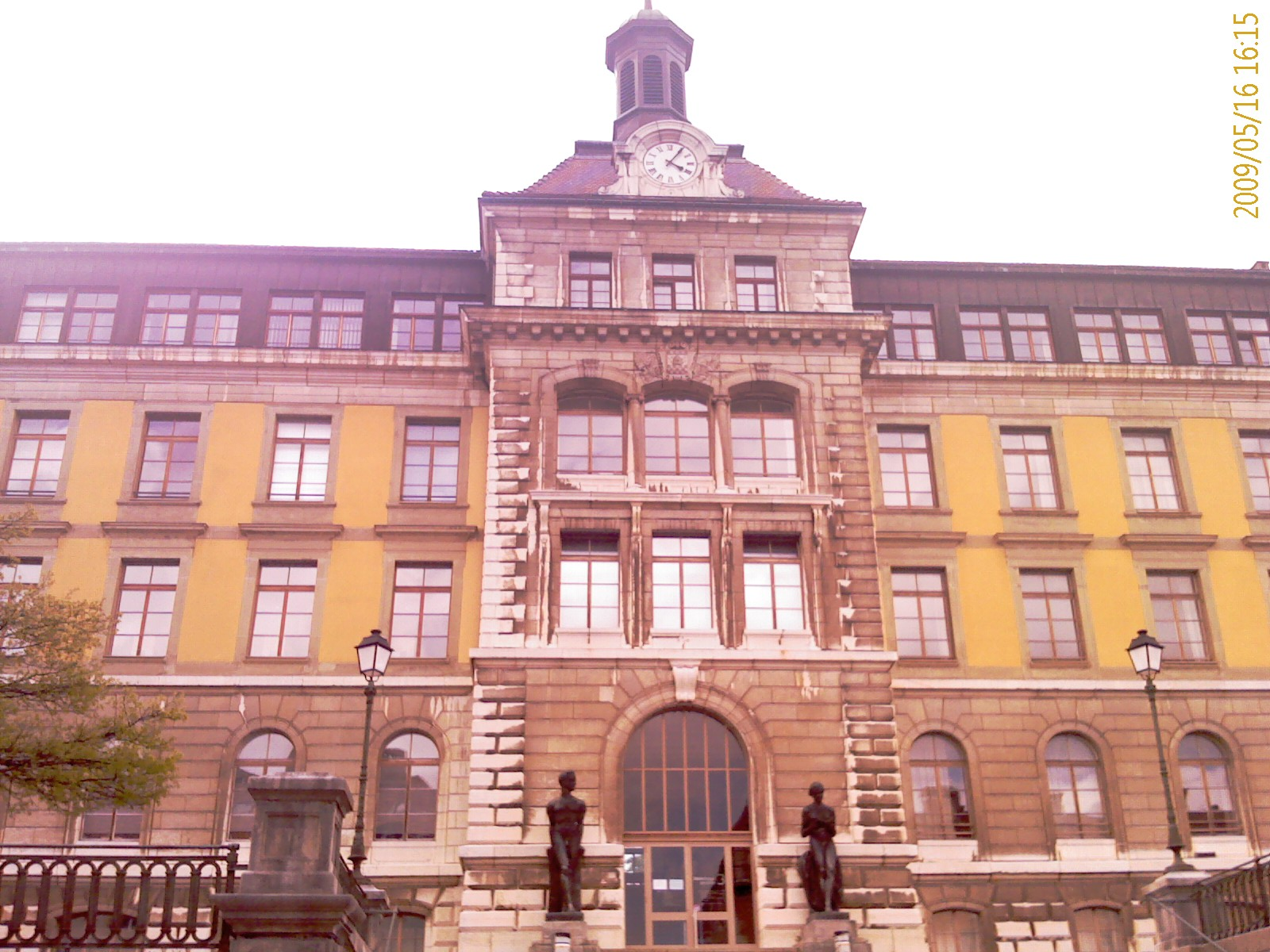
Chaux-de-Fonds city library, home of the CDELI

The Centre de documentation et d'étude sur la langue internationale (CDELI; English: Center for Documentation and Study about the International Language) in La Chaux-de-Fonds, Switzerland, was founded in 1967 by Claude Gacond. It is the main branch of the city's library and contains more than 20,000 bibliographic units. Interlinguistically neutral (thus "la langue internationale"), CDELI aims to preserve documents in and about all kinds of constructed languages: it offers, in addition to Esperanto books and periodicals, the richest collections of materials about Volapük and Interlingue, among others.
