= Stanko =

Stanko (Cyrillic: Станко) or Stańko is a gven name and a surname. It is a double diminutive of the Slavic masculine given names starting with 'Stan-': Stanislav, Stanimir, etc. -> Stan/Stań -> Stanko/Stańko. As a Polish surname, it has archaic feminine forms (still used colloquially): Stańkowa (by husband), Stańkówna (by father). Nicknames in Serbo-Croatian: Ćane, Ćano. Notable people with the name include:

== Given name ==
- Stanko Abadžić (born 1952), Croatian photographer and photojournalist
- Stanko Barać (born 1986), Croatian professional basketball player
- Stanko Bloudek (1890–1959), Slovenian aeroplane and automobile designer, sportsman and sport inventor, designer, builder and educator
- Stanko Bubalo (born 1973), Croatian football striker
- Stanko Crnojević (1457–1528), Serbian lord and Ottoman vassal
- Stanko Karaman (1889–1959), researcher on amphipods and isopods
- Stanko Kotnik (1928–2004), Slovene professor of Slavic studies at the University of Maribor
- Stanko Lorger (1931–2014), Slovenian former hurdler and Olympic competitor
- Stanko Mladenovski (born 1937), Macedonian politician
- Stanko Mršić (born 1955), Croatian football manager and a former player
- Stanko Poklepović (1938–2018), Croatian football coach
- Stanko Prek (1915–1999), classical guitarist and composer from Slovenia
- Stanko Premrl (1880–1965), Slovenian Roman Catholic priest, composer and music teacher
- Stanko Subotić (born 1959), Geneva-based Serbian businessman
- Stanko Svitlica, retired Serbian football player
- Stanko Tavčar (1898–1945), Slovenian footballer and later a medical doctor
- Stanko Todorov (1920–1996), Bulgarian communist politician
- Stanko Vraz (born Jakob Frass) (1810–1851), Croatian-Slovenian poet
- Stanko Yovchev (born 1988), Bulgarian footballer

== Surname ==
- Anastasia Stanko (born 1986), Ukrainian journalist
- Betsy Stanko (born 1950), American criminologist academic
- Ewa Grajkowska-Stańko (born 1948), Polish sprint canoeist who competed in the early 1970s
- Stephen Stanko (1968–2025), American executed murderer
- Steve Stanko (1917–1978), American heavyweight weightlifter and bodybuilder
- Tomasz Stańko (1942–2018), Polish jazz trumpeter, composer, and improviser

== See also ==
- Stanco
- Stancho
- Staněk
- Stankov
- Stanko Mlakar Stadium (Slovene: Štadion Stanka Mlakarja) is a multi-purpose stadium in Kranj, Slovenia
- Stankovce
- Stankovci
- Stanković
- Stankovo (disambiguation)
- Stankowo (disambiguation)
- Stenka (name)
