= Stańkowa =

Stańkowa may refer to:

- Archaic/colloquial feminine form of the Polish surname Stańko
- Stańkowa, Lesser Poland Voivodeship
- Stańkowa, Podkarpackie Voivodeship

== See also ==
- Stankova (disambiguation)
