= Ratimir Martinović =

Montenegrin pianist

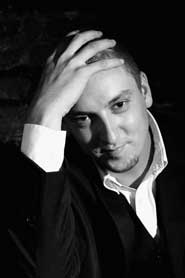

Background information
- Born: Kotor, Montenegro
- Genres: Classical music
- Occupation: Pianist
- Instrument: Piano
- Label: Maestoso Productions
- Website: www.ratimirmartinovic.me

Ratimir Martinović (Serbian Cyrillic: Ратимир Мартиновић, pronounced [rǎtimiːr martǐːnɔʋit͡ɕ]) is a Montenegrin pianist.

== Biography ==
Martinović was born in Kotor, Montenegro, then Yugoslavia, where he completed the elementary music school; he continued his education in Novi Sad at the Isidor Bajić Music school and at the Academy of Art in the class of the world-renowned pianist Kemal Gekić. He graduated in 1999 playing in one night Bach's Goldberg Variations, Beethoven's Hammerklavier Sonata, Chopin's Four Ballades, and Prokofiev's Toccata to great critical acclaim.

He received his master's degree in 2002, playing an all Bach program.

At present, Martinović works at the Academy of Arts, as the youngest piano professor.

He has had advanced studies with well-known pedagogues and pianists such as Karl-Heinz Kämmerling, Hiroko Nakamura, Jacques Rouvier, Arie Vardi, Sergio Perticaroli, Arbo Valdma, Alexei Nasedkin, Jelena Richter, Victor Liadov and Marian Ribicky.

He has performed in over 350 recitals, chamber concerts, concertos with orchestra. He played in all major domestic concert halls such as the Sava centar, Kolarac Memorial Hall, the Montenegrin National Theater, the Novi Sad Synagogue, the Serbian National Theatre, Subotica Town Hall, as well as on podiums in Rome (Sala Baldini), Salzburg (Leopold Mozart Hall), Bonn, London (St. James Picadilly, St. John's Smith Square), Taipei (Small Hall of the National Theater), Miami (FIU Great Hall), Helsinki (Sibelius Academy Hall), Warsaw, Hamamatsu, Paris (UNESCO hall), Helsingborg (Great hall of Helsingborg Symphony Orchestra), Cologne (Deutsche Welle Hall), Zagreb (Lisinski Hall), Luxembourg (Auditoire Banque de Luxembourg), Turku and elsewhere.

Martinović plays as soloist with orchestras such as the Belgrade Philharmonic Orchestra, the Novi Sad Chamber Orchestra, Helsingborg Symphony Orchestra, the Young European Soloists Chamber Orchestra (South-Eastern Europe), Vojvodina Symphony Orchestra, »Saint George« String Orchestra, the Radio-Television Serbia Symphony Orchestra, the Stanislav Binicki Symphony Orchestra, Academy of Arts Symphony Orchestra, Niš Symphony Orchestra, Tapiolla Simfonietta, Ciudad de Juarez Chamber Orchestra, collaborating with conductors such as Emil Tabakov, Peter Sundkvist, Carlos Garcia Ruiz, David Porceline, Andrej Bursać, Aleksandar Ostrovski, Angel Surev, Pavle Medaković and Petar Ivanović.

He regularly performs in festivals such as, NOMUS (Novi Sad Music Festival), NIMUS (Nis Music Festival), Mozart Point Festival (Ljubljana), BEMUS (Belgrade Music Festival), Festival of the Nations (Rome), Beethoven Fest (Bonn), Budva Summer Festival, OKTOH (Kragujevac), KotorArt (Kotor)

Martinović is also an experienced chamber musician performing regularly with violinist Roman Simović (2005 winner of Lipizer competition), the Rubicon, Tippett (Great Britain) and TAJJ string quartet, cellists Bozidar Vukotić and Dragan Djordjević, percussionist Benn Toth and others.

After initial successes in piano competitions at very early age, Ratimir Martinović withdrew from the competition scene, devoting his time to playing concerts.

== Awards ==
He is the winner of domestic and international awards and tributes.

- First prize, Montenegro National competition, Kotor, 1990, 1991
- First Prize, The Yugoslav piano Competition, Niš, 1993
- First Prize, The Dunav-Donau-Denjub International Piano Competition, Novi Sad, 1993
- First Prize, International Frederic Chopin Piano Competition, Taipei, 1996
- Two Special Prizes (awarded by the president of the jury),

for a compulsory author and a performance of Chopin’s works, Taipei, 1996

- First Prize, The "FLAME" International Competition, Paris, 1997
- Fourth Prize, Bronze Medal, South Missouri International Piano Competition, Joplin, USA, 1994
- Special prize from the University of Novi Sad, for outstanding talent, 1997, 1998
- Prize for the 'Most promissin young artist of the year', (ZAMTES) Montenegro, 1999

== Discography ==
- Debut recording (Bach/Tausig, Mozart, Chopin, Brahms, Prokofiev) (2001)
- Bach (Goldberg variations BWV 988)
- Skryabin Concerto F Sharp Minor and Tchaikovsky Concerto No. 2 G major op. 44
- Mendelssohn:
  - Concerto G Minor
  - Concerto A Minor (for string orchestra)
  - Concerto for piano, violin and string orchestra

He has recorded for Radio Television of Montenegro, Radio Television of Serbia, POLTEL(Poland), Deutsche Welle (Germany), NHK (Japan), SVT (Sweden), Luxembourg Television, HRT (Croatia), Radio Slovenia and Radio Romania.

He has recorded two CDs, one with the works by Bach/Tausing, Mozart, Chopin, Brahms, Prokofiev and the »Goldberg variations«.

Martinović initiated a successful collaboration with the TV director Misko Milojevic in the field of visualisation of classical music opening new dimensions of visual and multimedial interpretation of music. To date, he has made seven video-clips (Ginastera, Prokofiev, Chopin, Rachmaninoff, Bach, Brahms, Ravel) produced by Radio Television Montenegro and Radio Television Serbia, broadcast with great success, so far, in Serbia, The Czech Republic, Canada, Bulgaria, Tunisia. In 2006 a DVD with all 7 classical music spots will be released by KotorArt Production.

Five documentary movies have been recorded about his work, of which the last one, »The Heaven And Soul« has won first prize in the International TV Festival in Albena, Bulgaria in 2004, and was officially the »Best musical TV production in 2004.« in Radio-Television Serbia.

Martinović made his conducting debut in 2001. with the Novi Sad Chamber Orchestra, conducting Symphonies by Haydn and Mozart and playing and conducting the Mozart Piano Concerto F Major KV 459.

Ratimir Martinović is the founder and Artistic director of KotorArt Music festival, held every year in Kotor, Montenegro, bringing to this medieval town ensembles such as the Zagreb Philharmonic, the Vojvodina Symphony, the Split Chamber Orchestra, “LADO” and soloist and teachers such as Mikhail Voskresensky, Aleksandar Madzar, Konstantin Bogino, Grigory Zhislin, Itamar Golan, Lovro Pogorelich, Francesco Libetta, and many others.

»The ideal combination of intellect, technique and passion, refinement of touch, perfect technique, concentration and control, exceptional dynamic potential, original ideas and unconventional interpretation« give Ratimir Martinović, by the critics' words, one of the leading places among pianists of the younger generation.

Martinović is President of EPTA Montenegro (European Piano Teachers Association).
