= Stanković =

Stanković (Serbian Cyrillic: Станковић, pronounced [stǎːŋkoʋitɕ]) is a common surname derived from the South Slavic masculine given name Stanko. Stanković is the eighth most frequent surname in Serbia, and is also common in Croatia, with 2,842 carriers (2011 census). It may also be transliterated as Stankovich or Stankovych or Stankovic.

== Geographical distribution ==
As of 2014, 81.6% of all known bearers of the surname Stanković were residents of Serbia (frequency 1:175), 8.4% of Bosnia and Herzegovina (1:840), 3.4% of Croatia (1:2,457), 3.2% of Kosovo (1:1,147) and 2.4% of Montenegro (1:529).

In Serbia, the frequency of the surname was higher than national average (1:175) in the following regions:

1. Jablanica District (1:36)
2. Pčinja District (1:55)
3. Nišava District (1:63)
4. Toplica District (1:74)
5. Zaječar District (1:91)
6. Pirot District (1:91)
7. Podunavlje District (1:138)
8. Bor District (1:139)
9. Braničevo District (1:142)
10. Pomoravlje District (1:156)

== People ==
- Aca Stanković (born 1967), Serbian pole vaulter
- Aleksandar Stanković (born 2005), Serbian Footballer
- Boris Stankovich (born 1980), New Zealand rugby union player
- Borisav Stanković (1876–1927), Serbian realist writer
- Borislav Stanković (1925–2020), Serbian basketball administrator, longtime FIBA chairman, retired basketball player
- Branko Stanković (1921–2002), Serbian footballer and coach
- Bratislav Stankovic (born 1963), professor of law and biotechnology
- Dejan Stanković (football manager) (born 1957) Serbian football player and manager with Austrian citizenship
- Dejan Stanković (born 1978), Serbian footballer
- Dejan Stankovic (beach soccer) (born 1985), Swiss beach footballer of Serbian origin
- Eliza Stankovich (born 1981), Australian wheelchair racer
- Jon Gorenc Stanković (born 1996), Slovenian footballer
- Jovan Stanković (born 1971), Serbian footballer
- Konstantina M. Stankovic, American otolaryngologist and physician-scientist
- Kornelije Stanković (1831–1865), Serbian composer
- Marica Stanković (1900–1957), Croatian school teacher and writer
- Marko Stankovic (born 1986), Austrian footballer
- Mato Stanković (born 1970), Croatian futsal coach
- Milan Stanković (born 1987), Serbian singer
- Milić Stanković, birth name of painter Milić od Mačve
- Milovan Stanković (born 1969), Serbian writer
- Vasyl Stankovych (born 1946), Soviet fencer
- Vojislav Stanković (born 1987), Serbian footballer
- Yevhen Stankovych (born 1942), Ukrainian composer
- Zoran Stanković (born 1954), doctor and politician, Serbian Minister of Defense (2005–2007)
