= Rita Kinka =

Serbian pianist (born 1962)

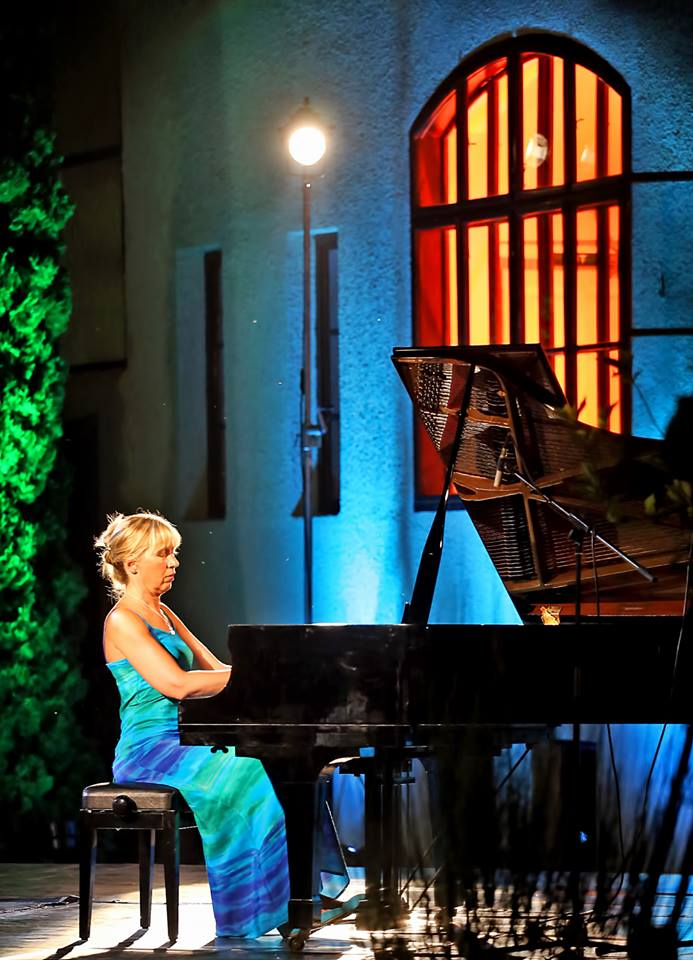
Rita Kinka

Rita Kinka (born 1962, in Subotica), is a Serbian pianist of Hungarian descent.

She graduated at the University of Novi Sad's Academy of Arts (where she is currently a professor) under Arbo Valdma, and finished her studies at the Juilliard School under György Sándor after she was granted the Gina Bachauer scholarship.

Kinka started a concert and recording career after winning the 1988 International Festival of Young Performers in Bordeaux; she had previously been prized at Zwickau's Robert Schumann, Brussels' Queen Elisabeth (Most promising artist prize), Munich's ARD and Sydney's competitions. Three years later she was awarded the Women of Europe Award for the best European interpreter from the European Commission.
