= Baros =

Baros may refer to:

== People ==
- Linda Maria Baros (born 1981), French-language poet, translator, and literary critic
- Milan Baroš (born 1981), Czech footballer
- Nenad Baroš (born 1986), Serbian politician

== Others ==
- Baros (island), an island in the Maldives
- Intravenous sodium bicarbonate, by the trade name Baros
