= Dorian Leljak =

Serbian musician

Dorian Leljak is a Serbian pianist holding professorship at the Academy of Arts in Novi Sad, where he was trained under Arbo Valdma, and the presidency of the European Piano Teachers Association's Vojvodina branch. Leljak served as a juror at the XVIII Cleveland International Piano Competition.
