= Stanek =

Stanek is a Polish-language gender-neutral surname. Obsolete feminine forms are Stankowa (married) and Stankówna (maiden). It originated as a diminutive of the given name Stanisław.

It is also a Polish noble surname belonging to the Pobóg clan.

The Czech-language variant of the surname is Staněk.

Notable people with this surname include:

- Al Stanek, American baseball player
- Jim Stanek, American actor
- Ryan Stanek, drummer with Broken Hope
- Ryne Stanek, baseball player
- Sonja Stanek, Austrian figure skater
- Hanna Stankówna, Polish actress
- The marriage name of Elena Laumenskienė, Lithuanian composer, music educator, and pianist
