= Valdma =

Family name

Valdma is an Estonian surname. Notable people with the surname include:

- Arbo Valdma (born 1942), Estonian pianist and music pedagogue
- Viire Valdma (born 1960), Estonian actress
