= Stankova (disambiguation) =

Stankova is the feminine counterpart of the Russian surname Stankov.

Stankova may also refer to:

- Staňková, feminine form of the Czech surname Staněk
- Stańkowa (disambiguation)
- Stankova, Kalush Raion, Ivano-Frankivsk Oblast – Rural locality in Ivano-Frankivsk Oblast, Ukraine
