= Stenka =

Stenka may refer to:

- Stenka (name)
- Stenka-class patrol boat – Soviet patrol boat class
- Stenka Mountain – Mountain in Queen Maud Land, Antarctica
