= Kemal Gekić =

Kemal Gekić (born February 16, 1962, in Split, Croatia, then Yugoslavia) is a Croatian-born American concert pianist and Full Professor of Piano Performance at Florida International University in Miami, Florida, USA.

== Early life ==
Kemal Gekić was born in Split, Croatia, to a Croatian mother and a Bosniak father. The maternal side of his family was extremely musical, and his father, an orthopedic surgeon, displayed a lifelong passion for music. Gekić displayed his musical gift extremely early even by the usual child prodigy standards - by picking up melodies by ear and accurately playing them on the piano at the age of one-and-half. Kemal received most of his early training from his maternal aunt, Prof. Lorenza Baturina, at the Music School "J.Hatze" in Split. He entered the class of Prof. Jokuthon Mihailović (a graduate of Moscow Conservatory) at the Art Academy of the University of Novi Sad, Serbia at age 16, earning his bachelor's degree in 1982 with the highest mark ever granted a diploma exam recital, after which he was immediately given a faculty appointment by the piano department, which he eventually directed until 1999.

== Education and performances ==
During his studies Gekić won prizes at many international piano competitions (F.Liszt in Parma, Italy, Viana Da Motta in Lisbon, Portugal), but it was after he earned his master's degree in 1985 -the year of his appearance at the Chopin Competition in Warsaw, Poland, that marked a turning point in his career. He began receiving invitations to perform abroad, including several from the Chopin Society of Hannover, Germany which had awarded him a special prize for best sonata performance at the competition. A recording of his Warsaw performances sold 60,000 copies in Germany and 80,000 copies in Japan. Upon hearing these live performances the producers of JVC VICTOR from Japan signed an exclusive contract with Gekić (1988), which resulted in a series of prominent albums featuring solo and orchestral compositions by Mozart, Chopin, Liszt, Tchaikovsky and Rachmaninoff. This also led to his longtime association with Japan, where he became a pianistic idol whose numerous concerts are frequently televised on the national television (NHK) and also regularly recorded live by In the years following the 1985 Chopin Competition, in addition to extensive concert activity in Germany, Switzerland, France, Spain, Portugal, Italy, Belgium, Denmark, Sweden, Poland, Czechoslovakia, Bulgaria, Greece, Turkey, Brazil, Guatemala, Venezuela, Bolivia, the US, Canada, and of course Yugoslavia, he completed tours of the USSR, Japan, South Korea, Taiwan, Thailand, Egypt and Kuwait. Since that time, Gekić has performed a great number of solo concerts and has played with many orchestras such as Warsaw Philharmonic, Royal Philharmonic of London, Japan Philharmonic Symphony, Leipzig Gewandhaus Symphony, Czech National Symphony Orchestra and others.

In 1999 he moved to Miami, Florida to take up his present post as Artist in Residence and Professor at the Florida International University. He is a visiting professor at the Musashino Academy of Music in Tokyo and a guest lecturer at numerous universities and academies throughout the world. He has served as a juror on numerous piano competitions (Gina Bachauer in Salt Lake City, Hilton Head, SC, Taiwan National Piano Competition, Nishinihon Competition, Japan etc.). Programs on his life and his performances have been broadcast by Rai Italia, TV Portugal, TV Yugoslavia, NHK, POLTEL Poland, RTV Lower Saxony West Germany, RTV USSR, Intervision, CBC and PBS.

As a recording artist, Gekić has won accolades in Europe, America and Japan for insightful, original views of the music. Unusually for today's artists, his 15 solo albums include 5 concerts recorded live. His NAXOS album " Rossini / Liszt Transcriptions: Soirees Musicales and William Tell Overture" won The Rosette Award of the Penguin Guide to Classical Recordings.

== Labels ==
Victor JVC, Palexa, NAXOS, Gama Media Records, Parma Records, Danacord, VAI

== Movies ==
The Erlking (Gama Media LLC, 2004)
