= Pascal Verrot =

French-born orchestra conductor

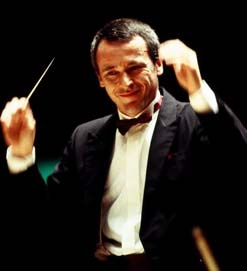
Pascal Verrot

Pascal Verrot is a French-born orchestra conductor who holds the post of principal conductor of the Sendai Philharmonic (Japan) and former musical director of Picardy Orchestra in France. Prior to that, he was music director of the Quebec Symphony Orchestra, the oldest orchestra in Canada, from 1991 to 1998.

Born in Lyon, France, in 1959, Verrot holds degrees both from the Sorbonne University in Paris and the Paris Conservatory, where he studied for four years with Jean-Sébastien Béreau, winning first prize in the conducting competition. During that time, he made his debut as an oboist and as conductor (1977–1982) of the wind ensemble Union Musicale of Villefranche-sur-Saône (to the north of Lyons). He also studied for three years with Franco Ferrara at the Accademia Musicale Chigiana in Siena, Italy.

Verrot made his international debut in 1985, when he was a prize-winner at the Tokyo International Conducting Competition. Since then, his guest conducting appearances have included many performances in Japan, in France and in North-America. Verrot has conducted several renowned North-American ensembles, including the Boston Symphony Orchestra, where he served as assistant conductor from 1986 to 1990, the Montreal Symphony, the Toronto Symphony, the Utah Symphony and most recently the Pacific Symphony. In his native country of France he has led major orchestras many times.

He made his operatic debut in 1989 conducting Die Fledermaus at the Lyon Opera House, and in 1991 conducted the Marriage of Figaro in Paris. His recent conducting includes the three Mozart-Da Ponte operas, Gounod's Faust at the inauguration of the new Shanghai Grand Theatre, and Debussy's Pelléas et Mélisande. In February 2002 he made his debut at the New National Theatre Tokyo conducting Mozart's Marriage of Figaro. In 2023, he has taken on the role of music director and conductor at the annual Music & More SummerFest held in the city of Trebinje, Bosnia & Herzegovina.
