= Mihajlo Kažić =

Serbian novelist

Mihajlo Kažić (in Serbian Михајло Кажић) (born in Pristina in 1960) is a Serbian novelist. He trained as an engineer, completing a civil engineering degree at the University of Novi Sad.

In 1985 he was awarded a Fulbright scholarship to study in the US, and obtained his M.Sc. and PhD in Engineering from the University of California in Los Angeles in 1986 and 1988 respectively. He worked as a science researcher and lecturer in Novi Sad (Serbia), Los Angeles, Corvallis, Oregon and in Paris (France) and Stuttgart (Germany). Kazic has since worked with several construction companies in Germany.

Emperor of the Galatians is his first work to be published in English. The book was originally printed in Germany by Kiepenheuer (Leipzig) in 1993.

Kazic has written two other books, both of which were published in Serbian and German. Broken Journey was published by Prosveta (Belgrade) and by Suhrkamp (Frankfurt) in 1996. The Gates of Heaven was published by Prosveta (Belgrade) in 1998 and by Suhrkamp (Frankfurt) in 1999.
