= Hanna Stankówna =

Polish actress (1938–2020)

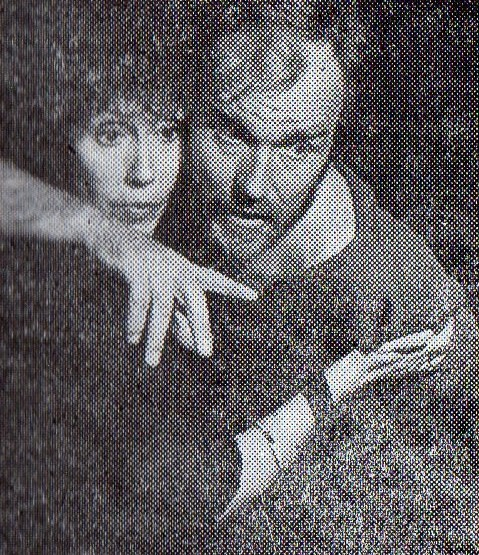
Hanna Stankówna (1986)

Hanna Stanek-Lisowska (stage name: Hanna Stankówna; (Note: Stankówna is a Polish historical form of a surname for an unmarried woman derived from father's surname (here from "Stanek")) 4 May 1938 – 14 December 2020) was a Polish film and stage actress.

== Awards ==
Hanna Stankówna was awarded the following decorations:

- 1995: Gold Cross of Merit
- 1988: Honorary badge "Zasłużony dla Teatru Polskiego w Warszawie" ("For the Merits to the Polish Theatre in Warsaw")
- 1987: Silver Cross of Merit
- 1986: Medal of the 40th Anniversary of the People's Republic of Poland
