= Stanco =

Stanco is a surname. Notable people with the surname include:

- Francesco Stanco (born 1987), Italian football player
- Michael Stanco (1968–2014), American professional wrestler
- Silvana Stanco (born 1993), Italian sport shooter

== See also ==
- Stanko
