= Gojko Palalić =

Serbian politician (born 1988)

- Born: 1988; Novi Sad, Yugoslavia
- Occupation: Politician

Gojko Palalić (Serbian: Гојко Палалић, born 1988) is a politician in Serbia. He has served in the National Assembly of Serbia since 2020 as a member of the Serbian Progressive Party.

== Early life ==
Palalić was born in 1988 in Novi Sad, Vojvodina, in what was then-the Socialist Republic of Serbia in the Socialist Federal Republic of Yugoslavia. He has a bachelor's degree (2011) and a master's degree (2013) from the University of Novi Sad Faculty of Technical Sciences, specializing in environmental engineering. He has worked as an advisor in Novi Sad's department of environmental protection.

== Politician ==
Palalić was given the 139th position on the party's Aleksandar Vučić — For Our Children electoral list in the 2020 Serbian parliamentary election and was elected to the assembly when the list won a landslide majority with 188 out of 250 mandates. He later became a member of the assembly's environmental protection. Palalić is a committee deputy member of the committee on constitutional and legislative issues as well as economy, regional development, trade, tourism, and energy; a deputy member of the agriculture, forestry, and water management committee. He is also member of the parliamentary friendship groups with Australia, Austria, Belarus, Belgium, Brazil, Bulgaria, China, Cuba, the Czech Republic, Denmark, Egypt, Finland, France, Germany, Greece, Hungary, India, Ireland, Israel, Italy, Japan, Luxembourg, Malta, Morocco, the Netherlands, Norway, Poland, Portugal, Romania, Russia, Slovakia, Slovenia, Spain, Switzerland, Tunisia, Turkey, the United Arab Emirates, the United Kingdom, and the United States of America.

Palalić is also a substitute member of Serbia's delegation to the Parliamentary Assembly of the Council of Europe (PACE), where he is an alternate member on the committee on legal affairs and human rights and the committee on social affairs, health, and sustainable development.
