= Stanek (disambiguation) =

Stanek may refer to:

- Stanek, a Polish-language surname
- Staněk, a Czech-language surname
- Stanek, Podlaskie Voivodeship (north-east Poland)
- Stanek, Opole Voivodeship (south-west Poland)
