= University of Novi Sad Faculty of Technical Sciences =

University faculty in Serbia

- Факултет техничких наука Универзитета у Новом Саду
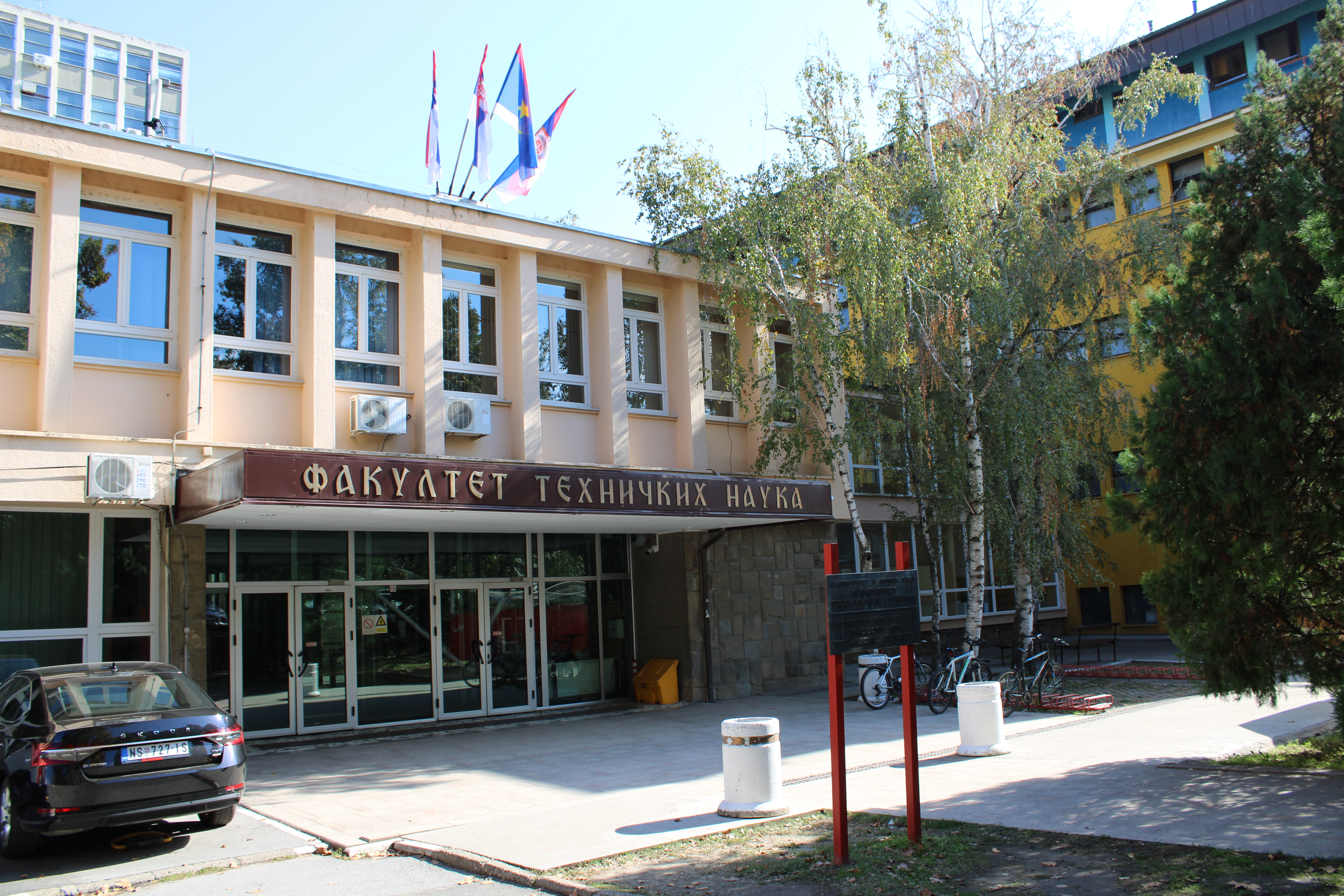
- Type: Public
- Established: 18 May 1960; 66 years ago
- Dean: Boris Dumnić
- Faculty: 897 (2023–24)
- Students: 17,163 (2023–24)
- Undergraduates: 13,270 (2023–24)
- Postgraduates: 3,124 (2023–24)
- Doctoral students: 769 (2023–24)
- Location: Novi Sad, Serbia; 45°14′46.2″N 19°51′06.1″E
- Campus: Urban
- Website: www.ftn.uns.ac.rs

The Faculty of Technical Sciences (Note: The word faculty in Europe stands for an academic institution, the sub-unit inside the University.) (abbr. FTN; Serbian: Факултет техничких наука Универзитета у Новом Саду, romanized: Fakultet tehničkih nauka Univerziteta u Novom Sadu) is a higher education institution located in Novi Sad, an independent part of the University of Novi Sad. It was founded on 18 May 1960 and today it is the largest faculty in Serbia by number of students and one of the largest in the region. As of 2023–24 academic year, it has a total of 17,163 students.

== History ==
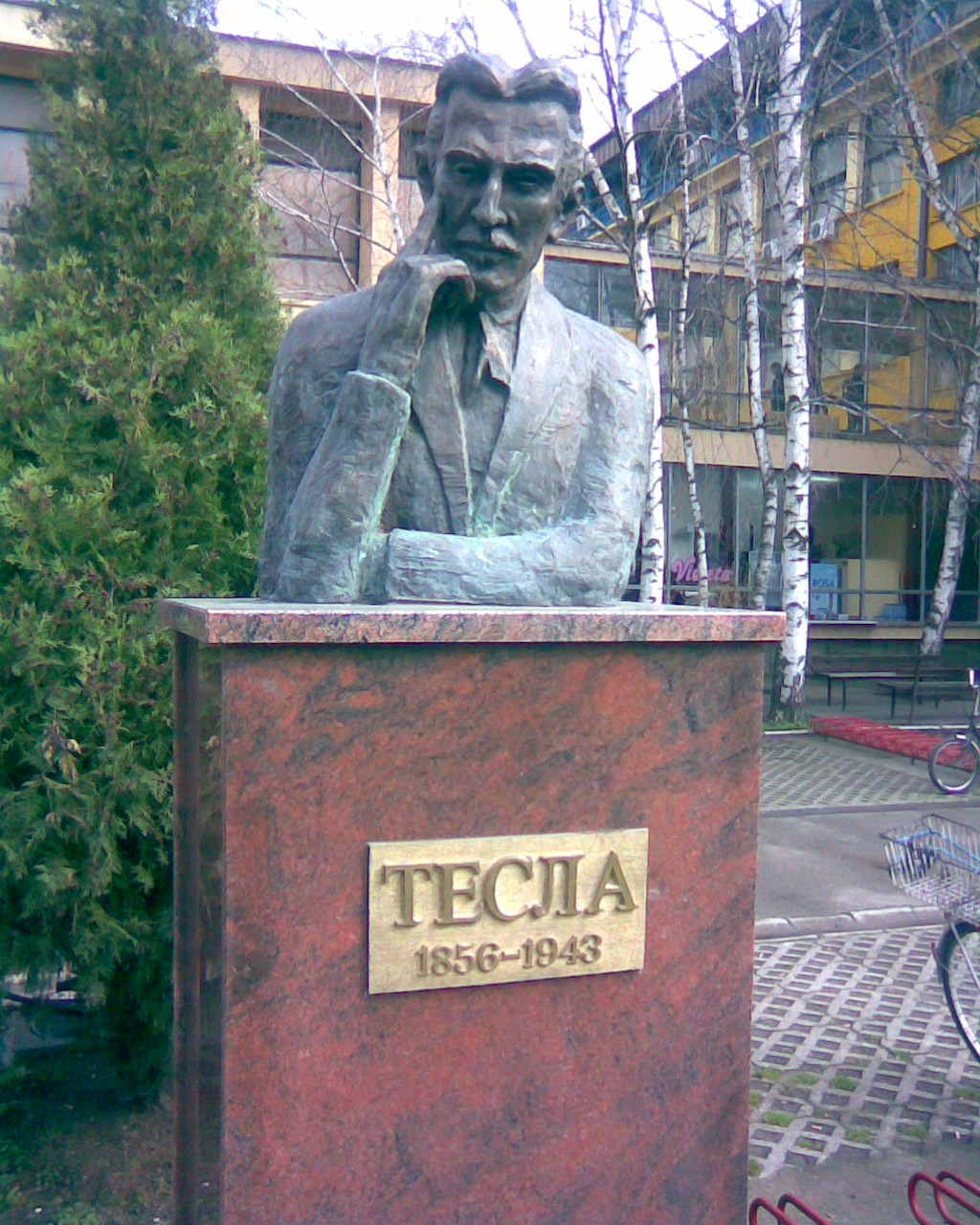
Monument dedicated to Nikola Tesla

=== Foundation and early years ===
The Faculty of Technical Sciences was founded on 18 May 1960, by decision of the Serbian Parliament as Faculty of Mechanical Engineering in Novi Sad, initially as an independent part of the University of Belgrade. With Novi Sad's charter as a university a month later, on 28 June 1960, the faculty became an integral part of it.

The Faculty began its work with seven teachers and ten assistants in the modified building of Technical School. The first dean of the newly opened faculty was Evgenije Čupić, and the first Chief of FTN council was Marko Bačlija. All the studies were at two levels and lasted four years. Lectures followed the educational plan of the University of Belgrade Faculty of Mechanical Engineering.

In 1962 the faculty acquired the Pedagogical Center building, where higher courses of studies were held. For a time, the Pedagogical Center belonged to the Faculty of Law; later it was returned to the Faculty of Technical Sciences. Today it is known as the "F" Block. An additional 890 m^{2} of laboratory and cabinet space was built for the Department for Power, Electronics and Communication Engineering.

The year following the Institute of Mechanical Engineering's completion in 1965, the faculty adopted a new plan of studies, raising the course length to five years.

The building of the teaching block and Rectorate building were completed in 1968. In 1971, the faculty introduced courses in electrical, electronics, civil engineering, telecommunications, signal processing, instrumentation, automation and computer science as sections of existing faculties in Belgrade.

=== 1974–1999 ===
On 22 April 1974, the Vojvodina's Assembly upgraded the Faculty of Mechanical Engineering into a Faculty of Technical Sciences, with Departments of Mechanical, Electrical and Civil Engineering. The dean at that time was Živojin Ćulum. Needing greater facilities, in 1979 the city of Novi Sad gave the Faculty the use of the former Factory of Mechanical Parts (TMD).

In the academic year 1978–79, the Department of Mechanical Engineering began courses on production mechanical engineering, and in the same year organized lectures in Kikinda, majoring in Production Engineering. The following year the Institute for Hydraulics and Traffic Engineering initiated the studies of Traffic Engineering at the Faculty. In 1987, the Large Systems Control Center was founded under the patronage of UNESCO.

=== 1999–present ===
The studies in Architecture and Urbanism began in the 1996–1997. Studies in Graphic Design and Engineering, Postal Traffic and Teletraffic Engineering, Industrial Engineering, Safety Engineering and Environmental Engineering began in academic year of 1999–2000. Studies of Mechatronics as interdisciplinary studies started in the academic year 2002–2003.

In 2006–07 academic year the first generation of students of academic studies was enrolled at the Faculty and the studies of Geodesy and Geomatics engineering were introduced into the educational activities of the Faculty in 2007–08 academic year.

Furthermore, in 2009–2010 the studies of Safety at Work were established at the Department of Environmental Engineering as well as the undergraduate professional program at the Department of Power Engineering – Renewable Energy Sources. In 2011–2012 academic year the following studies were established: Risk and Fire Protection Management, Animation in Engineering as well as undergraduate professional studies Software and Information Technology at the Faculty Department in Inđija; the same study program was also introduced at the Faculty Department in Loznica in 2012/2013 academic year. In 2013/2014 academic year the following study programs will be established: Biomedical Engineering, Measurement and Control, Clean Energy Technologies, Stage Architecture, Engineering and Design, Electric Power Software Engineering, Software Engineering and Information Technology in Novi Sad as well as at the Faculty Department in Loznica and undergraduate professional studies within the study program of Electronics and Telecommunication.

Мaster studies are organized at all study programs after finishing undergraduate academic studies as well as at study programs: Mathematics in Engineering; Digital Technology, Design and Production of Architecture and Urban Planning, Industrial Engineering – Advanced Engineering Technology, Planning and Management of Regional Development as well as Treatment and Water Protection (TEMPUS program) which rounds off the educational activities of the Faculty.

Faculty of Technical Sciences offers a very prominent educational profile for prospective engineers, which ranks it among the most developed institutions in the field of technology in our country.

== Organization ==
Faculty of Technical Sciences is organized as a unique complex institution comprising smaller organizational units such as departments, chairs, research centres, registrar offices, etc. for appropriate scientific fields and laboratories.

The Faculty of Technical Studies is located in seven buildings over an area of 29,000 m^{2} in the middle of the University campus in Novi Sad. It consists of 38 chairs, 13 institutes (departments), six scientific centers and six administration offices.

The Faculty was the first one in the former Yugoslavia to certificate its quality control system according to the international standards ISO 9001 at the SFRY Federal Bureau for Standardization and at the International Certificate Organization RWTÜV from Essen, Germany. The system has been re-certificated according to the changed standard ISO 9000 – 2000.

== Dean's Office ==
- Chairman of Faculty of Technical Sciences Council – Prof. Platon Sovilj, Ph.D.
- Dean of the Faculty of Technical Sciences – Prof. Boris Dumnić, Ph.D.
- Vice Dean for Science and International Cooperation – Prof. Darko Stefanović, Ph.D.
- Vice Dean for Students Academic Affairs – Prof. Aleksandar Kupusinac, Ph.D.
- Vice Dean for Finances and Development – Prof. Boris Dumnić, Ph.D.
- Vice Dean for Investments and Cooperation with Industry – Prof. Sebastian Baloš, Ph.D.
- Student Vice Dean – Marko Starović
- Secretary – Ivan Nešković, B.Sc.

== Activities ==
Faculty of Technical Sciences provides higher education in five areas namely: technical sciences and engineering, mathematics and natural sciences, arts and humanities as well as medical sciences in the following fields: Mechanical Engineering (Production Engineering, Machinery and Construction Engineering, Energy and Process Technology, Technical Mechanics and Design in Engineering); Electrical and Computer Engineering (Power, Electronic and Telecommunication Engineering, Computing and Control Engineering, Electric Power Software Engineering, Measurement and Control, Software Engineering and Information Technology, Power Engineering – Renewable Energy Sources); Civil Engineering; Traffic Engineering (Traffic and Transport Engineering, Postal Services and Telecommunications); Architecture (Architecture, Digital Technology, Design and Production in Architecture and Urban Planning); Industrial Engineering and Engineering Management (Industrial Engineering, Industrial Engineering – Advanced Engineering Technologies, Engineering Management); Environmental Engineering and Safety at Work (Environmental Engineering, Safety at Work, Risk and Fire Protection Management); Geodesy Engineering (Geodesy and Geomatics Engineering); Interdisciplinary studies such as Mechatronics, Applied Mathematics (Mathematics in Engineering), Graphic Engineering and Design, Logistic Engineering (Logistic Engineering and Management), Regional Policy and Development (Planning and Management of Regional Development), Biomedical Engineering, Stage Architecture, Engineering and Design, Treatment and Water Protection (Treatment and Water Protection Engineering), Energy Technologies (Clean Energy Technologies), Computer Graphic (Animation in Engineering); Energy Efficiency in Civil Engineering.

The Faculty's activities are threefold: education, research and applied research.

== Educational activity ==
Since 2005/2006 academic year, educational activities are carried out through the new structure of study programs and modules organized on three cycle degree studies:

=== First cycle studies ===
- undergraduate academic studies
- undergraduate professional studies.

=== Second cycle studies ===
- Master academic studies
- Specialist academic studies
- Master professional studies
- International Master Studies – Master of Business Administration – MBA studies

=== Third cycle studies ===
- Doctoral academic studies.

Academic studies are:

- Undergraduate academic studies (First cycle studies) – last for four years (worth at least 240 ECTS) and after graduation a candidate is awarded a Bachelor with Honors degree in engineering in a particular field of studies.
- Graduate Academic Master studies (Second cycle studies) depending on the completed undergraduate study program, last for one year (worth at least 60 ECTS), or 2 years (worth 120 ECTS). A candidate is awarded a master's degree in engineering or master's degree in arts in particular field of studies.
- Graduate Academic Specialist studies (Second cycle studies) depending on the completed undergraduate study program, last for one year (worth at least 60 ECTS), or 1.5 year (worth 90 ECTS). A candidate is awarded a specialist degree in engineering in particular field of studies.
- Doctoral academic studies (Third cycle studies) last for three years and are worth at least 180 ECTS. A candidate is awarded a Doctoral degree in engineering in particular field of studies.

Professional studies are:

- Undergraduate professional studies (First cycle studies) – last for three years and are worth at least 180 ECTS; a candidate is awarded bachelor's degree in applied engineering in particular field of studies.
- Master professional studies (Second cycle studies) – last for one or two years and are worth 60 – 120 ECTS; a candidate is awarded a degree in applied engineering in particular field of studies – Specialist.
- International practice oriented master's studies (Second cycle studies) – Master of Business Administration – MBA last for two years and are worth at least 120 ECTS; a candidate is awarded a master's degree in business management.

== Academic studies ==
(Undergraduate – UAS, Graduate – GAS, Specialist – SAS, Doctoral – DAS)

The Faculty received new accreditation decision to organize courses taught in English at academic study programmes (undergraduate, master and doctoral studies). The studies are organized in the following fields of science:

=== Mechanical engineering ===
- Production Engineering (UAS, GAS);
- Mechanization and Construction Engineering (UAS, GAS);
- Power Engineering and Process Technique (UAS, GAS);
- Technical Mechanics and Design (UAS, GAS);
- Mechanical Engineering (DAS)

=== Electrical and computer engineering ===
- Power, Electronic and Telecommunication Engineering (UAS, GAS, DAS);
- Power Software Engineering (UAS, GAS);
- Measurement and Control (UAS, GAS);
- Computing and Control Engineering (UAS, GAS, DAS);
- Software Engineering and Information Technology (Novi Sad (UAS, GAS), and Department in Loznica (UAS))

=== Civil engineering ===
- Civil Engineering (UAS, GAS).

=== Traffic engineering ===
- Traffic and Transport Engineering (UAS, GAS);
- Postal Traffic and Telecommunications (UAS, GAS);
- Traffic Engineering (DAS)

=== Architecture ===
- Architecture and Urbanism (UAS, GAS, SAS, DAS);
- Digital Technology, Design and Production in Architecture and Urban Planning (GAS)

=== Industrial engineering ===
- Industrial Engineering (UAS, GAS, SAS)
- Industrial Engineering – Advanced Engineering Technologies (GAS);
- Engineering Management (UAS, GAS, SAS);
- Industrial Engineering/Engineering Management (DAS)

=== Environmental engineering ===
- Environmental Engineering (UAS, GAS, SAS, DAS);
- Safety at Work (UAS, GAS, DAS);
- Environmental Engineering of Catastrophic Events and Fire (Risk and Fire Protection Management) (UAS, GAS)

=== Geodesy ===
- Geodesy and Geomatics Engineering (UAS, GAS, SAS, DAS)

=== Interdisciplinary fields of study ===
- Graphic Engineering and Design (UAS, GAS, DAS);
- Mechatronics (UAS, GAS, DAS);
- Applied Mathematics (Mathematics in Engineering) (GAS, DAS);
- Logistic Engineering (Logistic Engineering and Management) (GAS);
- Urban Planning and Regional Development (Planning and Management of Regional Development) (GAS);
- Computer Graphics (Animation in Engineering) (UAS, GAS, DAS);
- Energy Efficiency in Civil Engineering (SAS);
- Biomedical Engineering (UAS, GAS);
- Stage Architecture, Engineering and Design (UAS);
- Stage Design (Stage Architecture and Design) (GAS);
- Stage Design (DAS);
- Engineering Mechanics (DAS);
- Treatment and Water Protection (Treatment and Water Protection Engineering) (GAS);
- Energy Technologies (Clean Energy Technologies) (UAS, GAS)
- Information Systems Engineering (UAS, GAS)

== Professional studies ==
(Undergraduate – UPS, master – MPS)

- Electrical engineering (UPS)
- Software and Information Technologies (UPS)
- Electrical engineering (MPS)
- Production engineering (MPS)
- Engineering Management – MBA (International practice oriented master's studies) (MPS)

== Then and now ==
From its establishment until 1 October 2014, 16,722 students obtained the Bachelor and master's degree in engineering at the Faculty of Technical Sciences. This, 9,702 students obtained the diploma of Bachelor in engineering, of which 3,399 in the field of Mechanical Engineering, 3,938 in the field of Electrical and Computer Engineering, 833 in Civil Engineering, 706 in Traffic Engineering, in the field of Architecture 395, in the field of Industrial Engineering and Management 320, in the field of Graphic Engineering and Design 88 and in the field of Environmental Engineering 23 students.

Graduate academic studies – Master has so far completed 7,020 candidates; in the field of Mechanical Engineering 414, in the field of Electrical and Computer Engineering 1,747, in the field of Civil Engineering 482, in the field of Traffic Engineering 670, in the field of Architecture 766, in the field of Industrial Engineering and Management 1,802, in the field of Graphic Engineering and Design 429, in the field of Environmental Engineering 411, in the field of Mechatronics 140, in the field of Mathematics in Engineering 18, in the field of Geodesy and Geomatics 134 candidates and in the field of Urban Planning and Regional Development 7.

At the Faculty of Technical Sciences master's degree in Engineering obtained 887 candidates: in the field of Mechanical Engineering 275, in the field of Electrical and Computer Engineering 287, in the field of Civil Engineering 43, in the field of Architecture 24, in the field of Traffic Engineering 48, in the field of Industrial Engineering and Management 154, in the field of Environmental Engineering 43, in the field of Graphic Engineering and Design 7, and in Mathematics in Engineering 6 candidates.

At the Faculty of Technical Sciences PhD in Engineering obtained 524 candidates: in the field of Mechanical Engineering 145, in the field of Electrical and Computer Engineering 172, in Civil Engineering 33, in Traffic Engineering 27, in the field of Architecture 14, in the field of Industrial Engineering and Management 109, in the field of Environmental Engineering 19, while in the field of Graphic Engineering and Design 5 doctoral degrees are obtained.

According to the Law on Higher Education and the Decision of the Educational and Scientific Council of the Faculty on 28/05/2003 335 engineers obtained the diploma of the first cycle studies (sixth level of education) and 252 candidates received the Diploma of a Specialist in Engineering in a particular field of science. So far 5,205 students have obtained undergraduate academic degrees.

The Faculty was the first in this region to issue Diploma Supplement, before signing Bologna Declaration. Since 2004 it has started issuing Diploma Supplement to students in Serbian and English, which has greatly facilitated mobility and employment of our students in Europe and worldwide. Diploma Supplement is a document that is merged with the Diploma of Higher Education, also published in Serbian and English, and was made to offer a description of the nature, level, context, content and status of studies that was attended and successfully completed by the student named in the original diploma, which this supplement incorporated.

Based on the recommendations of the university (initiated by the FTS), the Rules on completion of the studies and acquisition of a title by the Law on Higher Education was adopted. Students are allowed to move into a new system of studies, and if they won 270 credits, finish their studies after the defence of Master thesis which is worth 30 credits, the student wins a total of 300 ECTS credits. So far, 3,703 candidates completed their studies and 56 enrolled doctoral studies which began in 2006/07 academic year. In 2012/13 the sixth generation enrolled the studies, so up to now 751 students entered doctoral studies.

Faculty of Technical Sciences was the first faculty in Serbia to enable students who completed the study according to the Law on University to replace their degree with ‘’new’’ Master's degree according to the Law on Higher Education. So far, around 1,000 diplomas have been substituted at the Faculty.

On 23 May 2008 Faculty of Technical Sciences received the Decision on the accreditation of the Faculty as a higher education institution. On 23 December 2011 the Faculty accredited higher education unit (Department) in Inđija, and in 2012 the department in Loznica as well. Until now, 90 study programmes for academic and professional studies have been accredited.

== Research activity ==
Research activities at the Faculty of Technical Sciences are oriented primarily to the realization of research projects funded by the Ministry of Science and Technology of the Republic of Serbia and the Provincial Department of Science and Technology. The Faculty participates in several European research projects (FP7, Eureka!, Cost, etc.). These are projects or subprojects in the field of basic research, innovative projects and technological development projects. On 19 February 2007 the Faculty received the Decision on accreditation of scientific activities in all scientific fields that are studied at FTS. In 2011 the Faculty received the Decision on the re-accreditation. Faculty scientific and research activities are carried out in modern laboratories and computer centre. Teachers and staff annually publish over 200 scientific papers in leading international and national journals and present them at international conferences in the country and abroad. FTS publishes the following journals:

- Production Engineering
- International Journal of Industrial Engineering and Management (IJIEM)
- Advanced Technologies and Materials] (former: Journal for Technology of Plasticity)
- Faculty of Technical Sciences Proceedings
- FTN Newspaper
- Journal of Graphic Engineering and Design
- Machine Design

The Faculty is a co-publisher of the following journals:

- Теchnics
- Computer Science and Information Systems

== Applied research ==
The strategic directions of cooperation with industry are oriented to the following areas:

- defining the needs of the economy for professional profiles – directions of individual vocations that are taught at the Faculty;
- coordination and direction of scientific and research work of the Faculty in accordance with a long-term economy and development programmes;
- increase of efficiency of applied research of the Faculty in solving current problems of economy.

Faculty of Technical Sciences currently signed more than 320 contracts with various commercial organizations.

The Faculty offers its services in resolving the current problems of the economy in the following areas:

- development of new products and production programs
- development of new technologies
- development of technological systems in the area of machining, assembly, material handling, control, etc.
- development of information–management systems
- the design of complex high-rise buildings, civil engineering and hydro
- saving energy, rational use and quality of electricity
- revitalization of existing technologies and technological systems
- environmental protection
- analysis of safety
- diagnostics, expertise and maintenance
- urban design
- projects of traffic and transport systems
- projects of energy, electronics and telecommunications
- projects of disaster risk management
- geo-information technologies and systems
- organizing seminars for permanent training of experts for the use of new techniques and technologies in the industry
- expertise in intellectual property protection

== International cooperation ==
The Faculty of Technical Sciences is strongly involved in the cooperation with a large number of scientific institutions worldwide, within the scope of its activities. The professors of the Faculty have been invited to give lectures at many universities in the most developed countries of the world, including Japan, the US, and the European Union countries. Significant achievements have been made in the international cooperation, resulting in over 50 realized international projects. During the last several years, large international projects have started to be realized from the programmes TEMPUS (EU), CEEPUS (EU), WUS (Austria), CARDS (EU), FP7 (EU), EUREKA! and Cost.

The Faculty is a place where numerous branches of important world organizations are formed and developed: IEEE (Institute of Electrical and Electronics Engineers) – Joint Chapter of Industrial Electronics, Industry Application and Power Electronics, and IIM Euro – International Graduate School for Industrial Engineering and Management.

On the basis of bilateral agreements, the Faculty of Technical Sciences has the cooperation with the following: Technical University (TU) Budapest, TU Kosice, Polytechnic School Timișoara, TU Bratislava, TU Prague, TU Salonica, the Technical University of Munich, the University of Stuttgart, TU Wien, UBI Brussels, University of Aveiro (Portugal), TU Lodz, University of Liege, National Technical University of Athens, Polytechnic University of Madrid, University of Limerick (Ireland), Galway – Mayo Institute of Technology (Ireland), University of Lugano – Switzerland, University of Manchester, University of Porto, University of United Nations in Bonn, University of Tuzla, University of Skopje, University of Maribor, University of Ljubljana, University of Zenica, University of Srpsko Sarajevo, University of Banja Luka, etc.

In the last ten years, the cooperation has been established with non-European universities as well, like the university "Prince of Songkla" Hat Yai –Thailand, University of Shanghai – China, Ohio State University – USA, University of New Hampshire – USA, University of Delaware – USA, Lakehead University – Canada, University of Free State Bloemfontein – Republic of South Africa, Indian Institute of Technology Roorkee – India, The University of Auckland – New Zealand, "National Chung Cheng University", Taiwan.

== See also ==
- University of Novi Sad
