= Stankov =

Stankov (Bulgarian: Станков) is a Bulgarian masculine surname, its feminine counterpart is Stankova. Notable people with the surname include:

== Sport ==
=== Association football ===
- Aleksandar Stankov (footballer) (born 1991), Macedonian football player
- Aleksandar Stankov (manager) (born 1964), Bulgarian football manager and former player
- Antonio Stankov (born 1991), Dutch-Macedonian football player
- Kiril Stankov (1949–1991), Bulgarian football player
- Martin Stankov (born 1974), Bulgarian football defender
- Nikolay Stankov (born 1984), Bulgarian football player
- Zdravko Stankov (born 1977), Bulgarian football defender

=== Other sports ===
- Georgi Stankov (born 1943), Bulgarian boxer
- Karyna Stankova, Ukrainian wrestler
- Nenad Stankov (born 1992), Macedonian basketball small forward

== Other people ==
- Dušan Stankov (1900–1983), Yugoslavian engineer
- Lazar Stankov, Australian psychologist
- Zvezdelina Stankova (born 1969), mathematician

== See also ==
- Staňkov (disambiguation)
