= Staňkov =

Staňkov may refer to places in the Czech Republic:

- Staňkov (Domažlice District), a town in the Plzeň Region
- Staňkov (Jindřichův Hradec District), a municipality and village in the South Bohemian Region
- Staňkov, a village and part of Pecka in the Hradec Králové Region
