= Nenad Baroš =

Serbian politician

Nenad Baroš (Serbian Cyrillic: Ненад Барош; born 1986) is a politician in Serbia. He has served in the local government of Vršac and was elected to the National Assembly of Serbia in the 2020 Serbian parliamentary election. Baroš is a member of the Serbian Progressive Party.

== Early life and private career ==
Baroš was born in Vršac, Vojvodina, in what was then the Socialist Republic of Serbia in the Socialist Federal Republic of Yugoslavia. He has a Bachelor of Laws degree from the University of Novi Sad, where he also holds a master's degree in academic studies and acquired the title Master of Laws, Department of Banking and Stock Exchange Law. He worked for Swisslion Takovo from 2013 to 2017, when he became director of the company Enološka stanica Vršac.

== Politician ==
=== Municipal politics ===
Baroš received the fourth position on the Progressive Party's electoral list for the Vršac municipal assembly in the 2016 Serbian local elections and was elected when the list won twenty seats. He was chosen as deputy president (i.e., deputy speaker) of the assembly after the election and was promoted to the position of president in September 2017. He was re-elected to the assembly in the 2020 local elections and was subsequently chosen for a second term as president of the assembly.

=== Parliamentarian ===
Baroš received the ninety-fourth position on the Progressive Party's Aleksandar Vučić — For Our Children list in the 2020 parliamentary election and was elected to the assembly when the list won a landslide majority with 188 out of 250 mandates. He is now a member of the assembly committee on the judiciary, public administration, and local self-government; a deputy member of the committee on Kosovo-Metohija and the agriculture, forestry, and water management committee; the head of Serbia's parliamentary friendship group with Jordan; and a member of the parliamentary friendship groups with the Bahamas, Botswana, Cameroon, the Central African Republic, China, Comoros, Cuba, the Dominican Republic, Ecuador, Equatorial Guinea, Eritrea, Grenada, Guinea-Bissau, Jamaica, Kyrgyzstan, Laos, Liberia, Madagascar, Mali, Mauritius, Mexico, Mozambique, Nauru, Nepal, Nicaragua, Nigeria, Palau, Papua New Guinea, Paraguay, the Republic of Congo, Saint Vincent and the Grenadines, Sao Tome and Principe, the Solomon Islands, South Sudan, Sri Lanka, Sudan, Suriname, Togo, Trinidad and Tobago, the United Arab Emirates, the United States of America, Uruguay, and Uzbekistan.
