= Stancho =

Stancho (Bulgarian: Станчо) is a Bulgarian masculine given name. Notable people with the name include:

- Stancho Belkovski (1891–1962), Bulgarian architect
- Stancho Bonchev (1942–2013), Bulgarian football player
- Stancho Kolev (1937–2025), Bulgarian freestyle wrestler
- Stancho Penchev (born 1940), Bulgarian weightlifter
- Stancho Stanchev (1932–2017), Bulgarian theatre director
