= Stankowo =

Stankowo may refer to the following places:

- Stankowo, Greater Poland Voivodeship (west-central Poland)
- Stankowo, Elbląg County in Warmian-Masurian Voivodeship (north Poland)
- Stankowo, Szczytno County in Warmian-Masurian Voivodeship (north Poland)
- Stańkowo, Pomeranian Voivodeship (north Poland)
