= Stenka (name) =

Stenka may be a given name and a surname. As a Russian given name Стенька, it is a diminutive of Stepan.

As a Polish gender-neutral surname, it may be derived either from the nickname stenka, 'brat' or from the diminutive for the name, Stenclaw, a Germanized version of Stanisław. Archaic feminine forms (still used colloquially): Stenczyna (after husband), Stenczanka (after father).

Notable people with the name include:

- Barbara Stenka, Polish poet and writer
- Danuta Stenka (born 1961), Polish actress
- Dariusz Stenka (born 1963), Polish speedway rider
- Stenka Razin (1630–1671), Cossack leader

== See also ==
- Sten (name)
- Stanko
