= Bratislav Stankovic =

Bratislav Stankovic (born 1963) is a multidisciplinary professor of law & biotechnology, and a registered U.S. patent attorney. Stankovic is the author of more than 100 peer-reviewed articles, books, book chapters, government and international reports on law, science and policy related to innovation, patents, technology transfer, bioethics, research ethics, reproductive technologies, stem cells, and plant space biology.

Stankovic has over 30 years of experience as a scientist, including 5 years as a Chief Scientist at the NASA-funded Wisconsin Center for Space Automation and Robotics, University of Wisconsin-Madison, where he was the principal investigator for experiments on the Space Shuttle and the International Space Station. He is a U.S. Fulbright Scholar. He is also the only recipient in Macedonia of a FP7 Marie Curie International Reintegration Grant, in this category of almost 7,000 grants awarded in Europe. Stankovic is ranked in the top 5% SSRN authors.

Bratislav Stankovic taught patent law at Loyola University Chicago School of Law and cell biology at North Carolina State University. In 2009-2014 he also served as a Science & Technology Advisor to the President of Macedonia Dr.Gjorge Ivanov.

Stankovic earned his Master of Science in plant physiology from the University of Novi Sad in 1991, his PhD in biological sciences from the University of Nebraska–Lincoln in 1994, and his juris doctor from University of Wisconsin-Madison in 2004.
