= Music & More SummerFest =

Annual music and drama festival held in Salzburg, Austria

Music＆More International Classical Music Festival & Summer Academy Music＆More SummerFest
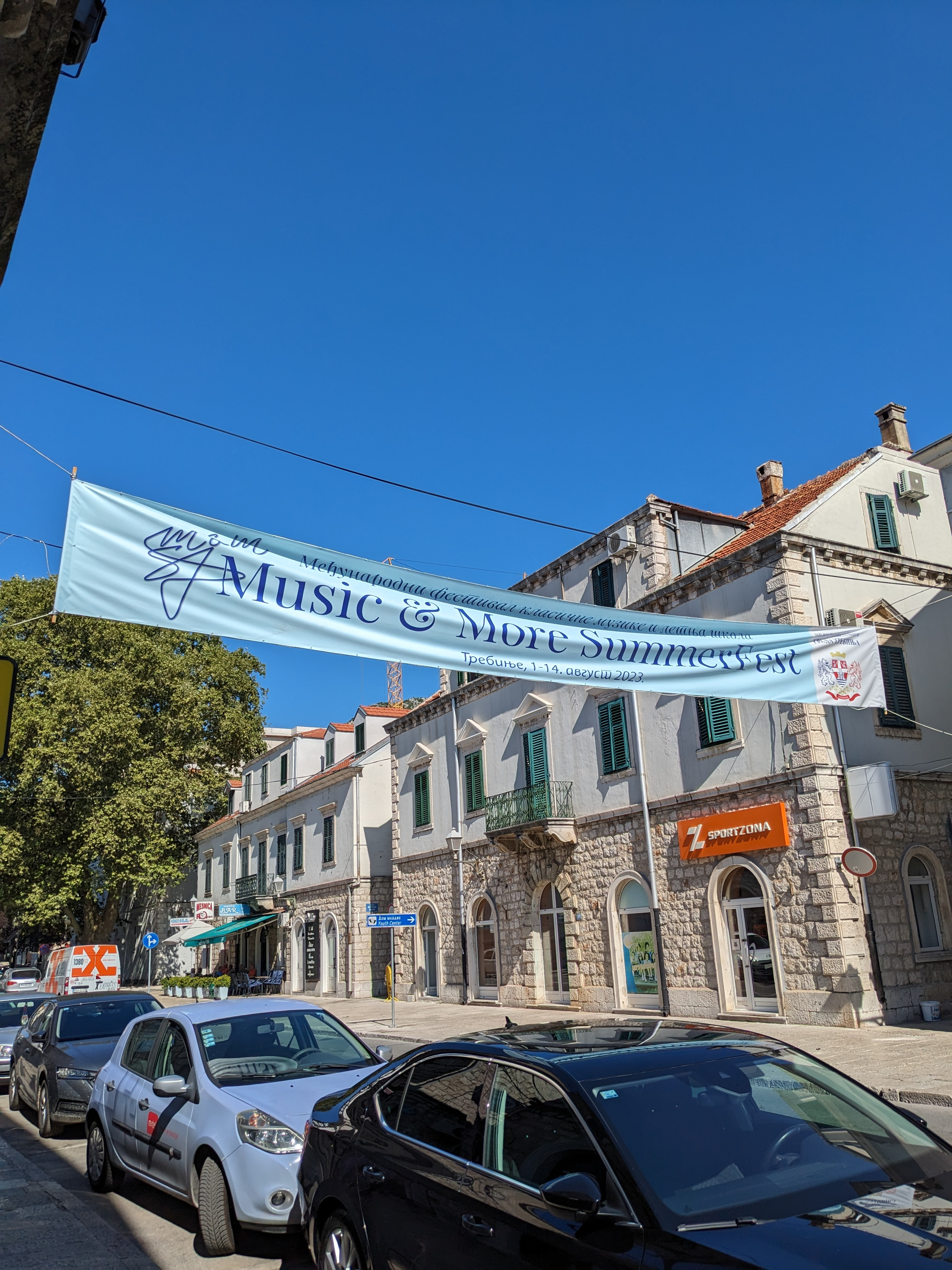
- Genre: Music
- Begins: early August
- Ends: mid of August
- Frequency: annual
- Locations: Trebinje, Bosnia & Herzegovina
- Inaugurated: 2018; 8 years ago
- Website: musicandmoresummerfest.com

Music & More SummerFest is a two-week annual international festival of classical and contemporary music, held in Trebinje, Bosnia & Herzegovina, in the first half of August. It was founded in 2018 by the pianist and educator Dr. Tatjana Rankovich, who also directs the festival.

The festival invites musicians to perform in six outdoor concerts in different locations around the town, such as the Amphitheater Crkvina and Villa Lastva, all of which are open to the public. Music students from over 20 countries study with the guest musicians and can participate in various musical activities, such as solo and ensemble performances, orchestra works, masterclasses.

The music director and conductor of the festival is French conductor Pascal Verrot.

In 2023, the festival expanded its scope and held additional concerts in Čačak, Serbia and Herceg Novi, Montenegro. In 2024, it held Inter-festival cooperation concert for KotorArt in Kotor, Montenegro.
