= Tomáš Staněk (historian) =

Czech historian (born 1952)

Tomáš Staněk (born 15 October 1952 in Ostrava) is a Czech historian, specializing in Czech-German relations, the position of the German population in the Bohemian lands in the 20th century and in the persecution of the population under the Communist regime at the turn of the 1940s to the 1950s. He was also active in politics. In 1994–1998, he was a representative of the city of Ostrava and in 2000–2008, he was a member of the Assembly of the Moravian-Silesian Region, both for the Civic Democratic Party (ODS).

Tomáš Staněk graduated from the Faculty of Philosophy of Palacký University of Olomouc (1972–1977). From the end of his studies, under communist rule in Czechoslovakia, he worked in the Silesian Institute of the Silesian Museum. He also worked as an external lecturer at the philosophical faculties of the University of Ostrava and Palacký University and became Doc. PhDr. at the Faculty of Public Policies of the Silesian University in Opava, where he is employed today (2018).

== Works ==
Tomáš Staněk is the author and co-author of several scientific articles and books.

- Odsun Němců z Československa 1945–1947 [Expulsion of the Germans from Czechoslovakia 1945–1947], ISBN 80-200-0328-2, 536 p., Prague 1991
- Předpoklady, průběh a důsledky vysídlení Němců z Československa (1918–1948) [Prerequisites, course and consequences of the expulsion of Germans from Czechoslovakia (1918–1948)]. ISBN 80-85498-04-9, 111 p., Ostrava 1992
- Německá menšina v českých zemích 1948–1989 [The German minority in the Bohemian/Czech Lands 1948–1989]. Prague 1993
- Perzekuce 1945 [Prosecution 1945]. Prague 1996
- Tábory v českých zemích 1945–1948 [Camps in the Czech Lands 1945–1948]. Opava 1996
- Retribuční vězni v českých zemích 1945–1955. [Retribution prisoners in the Czech Lands 1945–1948] Opava 2002
- Verfolgung 1945 [Prosecution 1945; German version of his 1996 book]. ISBN 3-205-99065-X, 242p., Wien 2002
- Poválečné "excesy" v českých zemích v roce 1945 a jejich vyšetřování [Post-war "excesses" in the Czech lands in 1945 and their investigations]. Praha 2005
- Internierung und Zwangsarbeit [Internment and forced labor]. Munich 2007
- with Adrian von Arburg (eds.) Vysídlení Němců a proměny českého pohraničí 1945–1951. Dokumenty z českých archivů. Díl I. Češi a Němci do roku 1945. Úvod k edici. [Displacement of Germans and Transformation of the Czech Borderland 1945–1951. Documents from the Czech Archives. Part I. Czechs and Germans until 1945. Introduction to the editions.] Středokluky 2010
- with Adrian von Arburg (eds.) Vysídlení Němců a proměny českého pohrančí 1945–1951. Dokumenty z českých archivů. Díl II., svazek 3. Akty hromadného násilí v roce 1945 a jejich vyšetřování. Středokluky 2010
- with Adrian von Arburg (eds.) Vysídlení Němců a proměny českého pohraničí 1945–1951: Dokumenty z českých archivů. Díl II., svazek 1. Duben–srpen/září 1945. „Divoký odsun“ a počátky osídlování. Středokluky 2011
- Němečtí váleční zajatci v českých zemích v letech 1945–1950: Nástin vybraných problémů. Opava 2011
