= Stankovo =

Stankovo may refer to:

- Stankovo, Slovenia, a hamlet near Brežice
- Stankovo, Croatia, a village near Jastrebarsko
