= Staněk =

Staněk (feminine: Staňková) is a Czech surname, a pet form of the given name Stanislav. Notable people with the surname include:

- Antonín Staněk (born 1966), Czech politician
- Blanka Staňková (born 1973), Czech volleyball player
- Eliška Staňková (born 1984), Czech athlete
- František Staněk (born 1944), Czech rower
- Jaroslav Staněk (born 1940), Czech table tennis player
- Jindřich Staněk (born 1996), Czech footballer
- Maruska Stankova (1934–2000), Czech-Canadian actress
- Roman Staněk (born 2004), Czech racing driver
- Roman Staněk (entrepreneur), Czech technology entrepreneur
- Sonja Stanek, Austrian figure skater
- Tomáš Staněk (born 1991), Czech athlete
- Tomáš Staněk (historian) (born 1952), Czech historian
- Willibald Stanek (1913–2007), Austrian ice hockey player

== See also ==
- Stanek (disambiguation)
