= University of Novi Sad =

University in Serbia

Coordinates: 45°14′51.459″N 19°51′14.666″E

- Универзитет у Новом Саду; Univerzitet u Novom Sadu; Újvidéki Egyetem
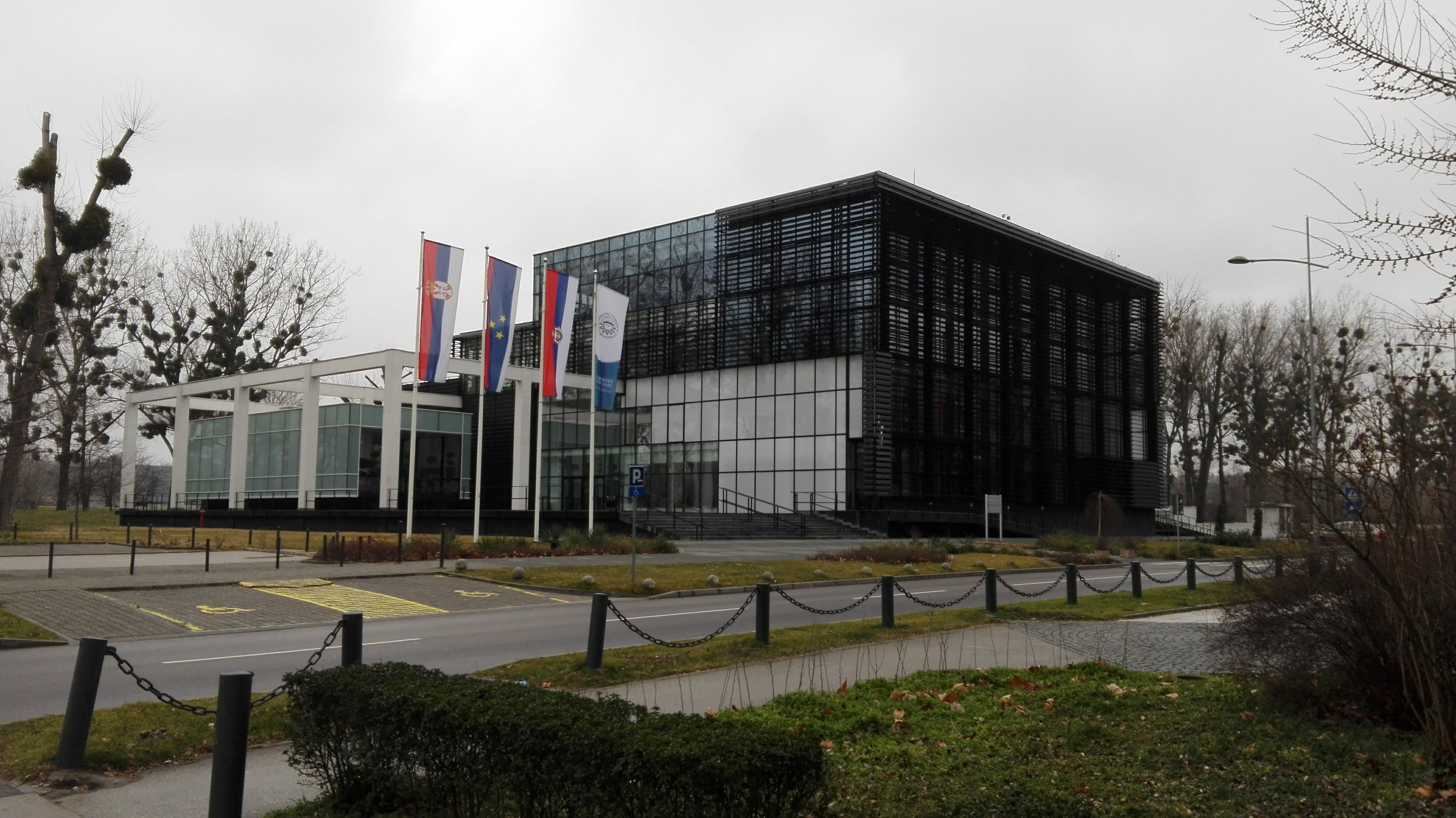
- Type: Public
- Established: June 28, 1960; 66 years ago
- Academic affiliations: European University Association; Erasmus; AUF
- Budget: €63.06 million (2020, planned; public funding)
- Rector: Dejan Мadić
- Academic staff: 3,004 (2024–25)
- Administrative staff: 1,428 (2024–25)
- Students: 49,201 (2024–25)
- Undergraduates: 34,582 (2024–25)
- Postgraduates: 11,492 (2024–25)
- Doctoral students: 2,792 (2024–25)
- Location: Dr Zorana Đinđića 1, Novi Sad, Vojvodina, Serbia
- Campus: University campus
- Website: www.uns.ac.rs

The University of Novi Sad (Serbian: Универзитет у Новом Саду, Univerzitet u Novom Sadu; Hungarian: Újvidéki Egyetem) is a public university in Novi Sad, Serbia. It is the flagship institution of higher education in the Autonomous Province of Vojvodina.

As of the academic year 2025/2026, with 48,180 students and 4,017 faculty staff, it is the second largest university in Serbia and one of the largest educational and research centers in South Eastern Europe. It belongs to the group of comprehensive universities, which are characterized by providing nearly all fields of science and higher education. It is composed of 14 faculties and three scientific institutes located in four university cities - Novi Sad, Sombor, Subotica and Zrenjanin.

== History ==
The foundations of higher education in Vojvodina can be traced back to 1740, with the establishment of the Collegium Vissariono-Pawlovicsianum Petrovaradinense seminary in Novi Sad. In 1778, the Norma, a school for the education of Serbian teachers, was founded in Sombor and in 1812, the Preparandija, a teacher training college was founded in Szentendre, whose seat was moved to Sombor in 1816. These institutions were important forerunners to the University of Novi Sad.

The seat of Matica Srpska, the oldest cultural and scientific institution of the Serbian people, was relocated to Novi Sad in 1864. The development of legal sciences and education on the territory of today's Vojvodina was particularly influenced by the Faculty of Law in Subotica, established in 1920. In 1960, the National Assembly adopted the Law on establishment of the University of Novi Sad, which brought together previously founded faculties into a unique academic community of Novi Sad. The University schools that had previously existed in Novi Sad since 1954, the Faculty of Liberal Arts, Agriculture, Law, Medicine, Technology, Economics, Mechanical Engineering, Mathematics and Natural Sciences, were merged into one entity.

== Organization ==
=== Faculties and Institutes ===
The faculties and institutes of the University of Novi Sad are situated in four historic cities of the Autonomous Province of Vojvodina, in the north of the Republic of Serbia. The seat of the university is in Novi Sad, with the central campus situated on the bank of the river Danube, in the vicinity of Petrovaradin Fortress (built in the 18th century), and the old city center.

#	Faculty	Headquarters	Year of Establishment
1	Faculty of Agriculture	Novi Sad	1954
2	Faculty of Philosophy	Novi Sad	1954
3	Faculty of Law	Novi Sad	1955
4	Faculty of Technology	Novi Sad	1959
5	Faculty of Economics	Subotica	1960
6	Faculty of Technical Sciences	Novi Sad	1960
7	Faculty of Medicine	Novi Sad	1960
8	Faculty of Natural Sciences and Mathematics	Novi Sad	1969
9	Academy of Arts	Novi Sad	1974
10	Faculty of Civil Engineering	Subotica	1974
11	Technical Faculty Mihajlo Pupin	Zrenjanin	1974
12	Faculty of Sports and Physical Education	Novi Sad	1974
13	Faculty of Pedagogy	Sombor	1993
14	Teachers' Training Faculty (in Hungarian language)	Subotica	2006

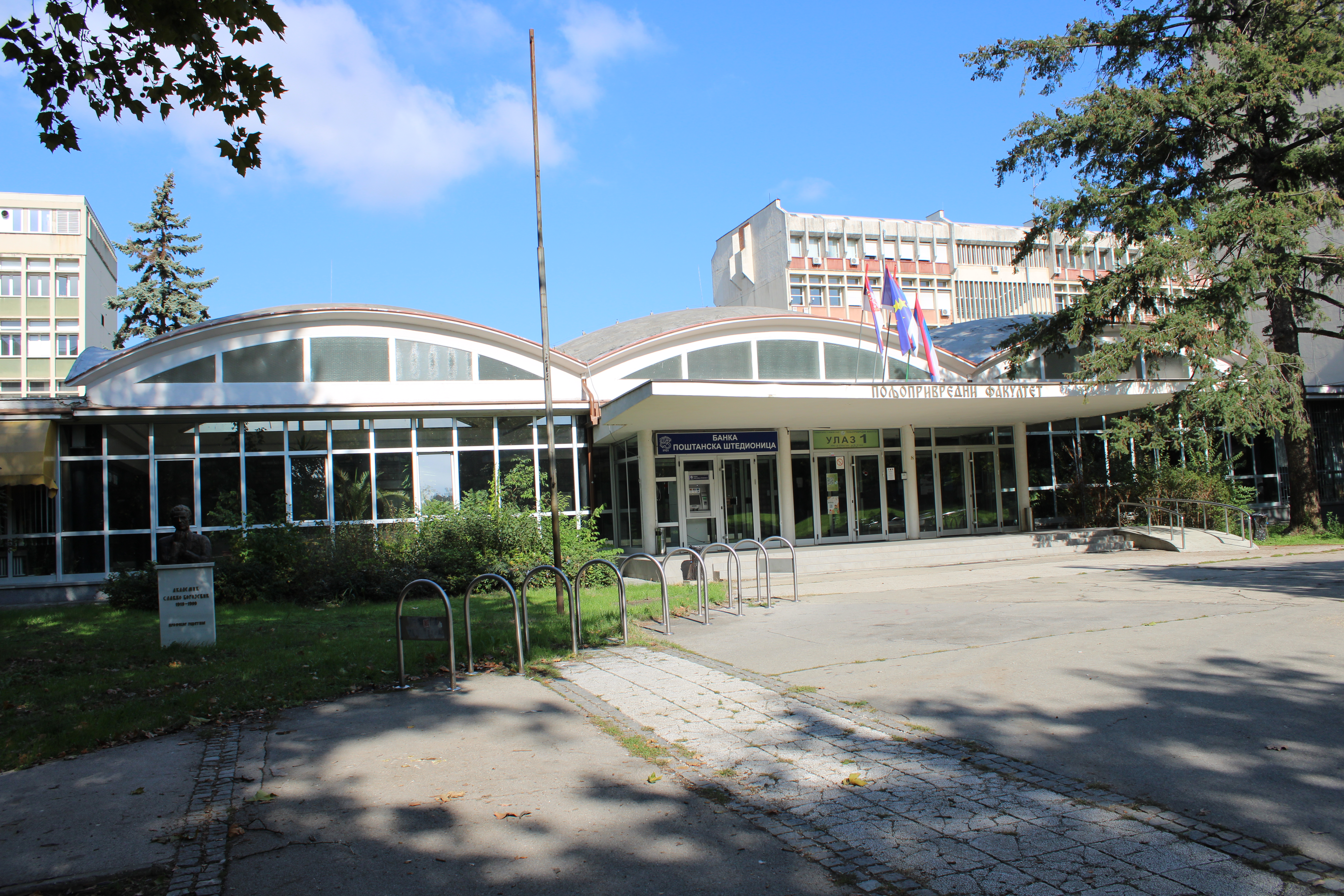
Faculty of Agriculture

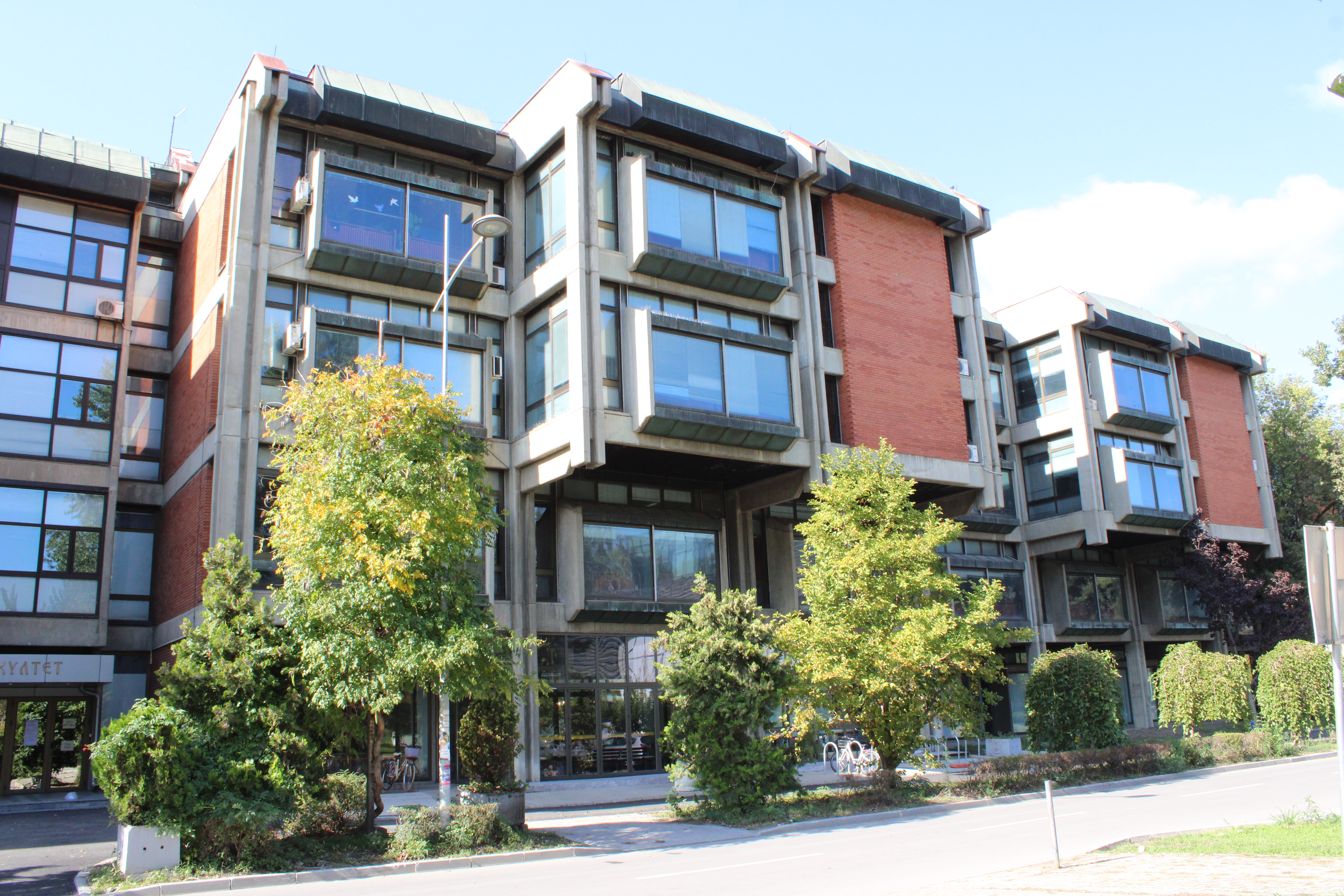
Faculty of Philosophy

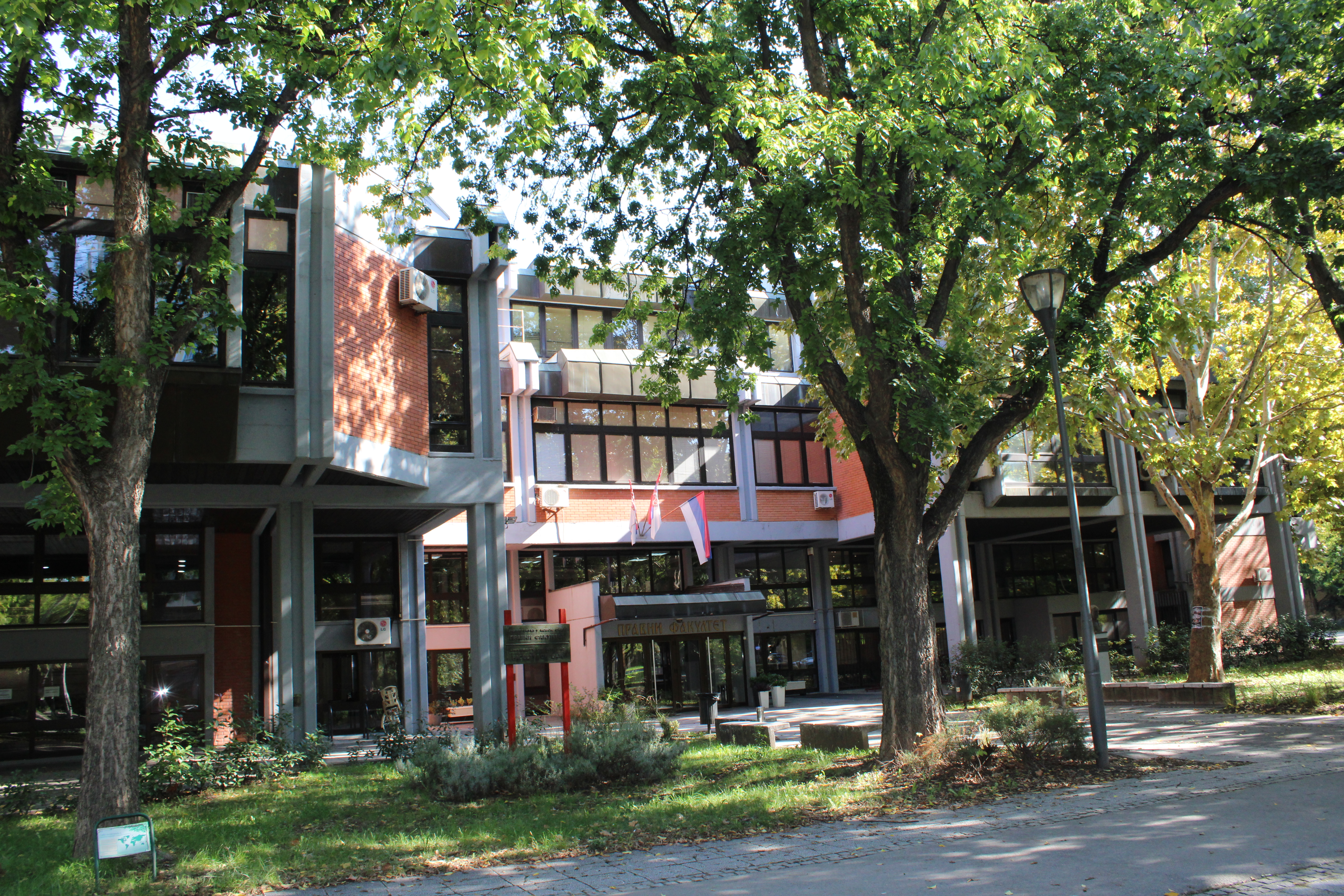
Faculty of Law

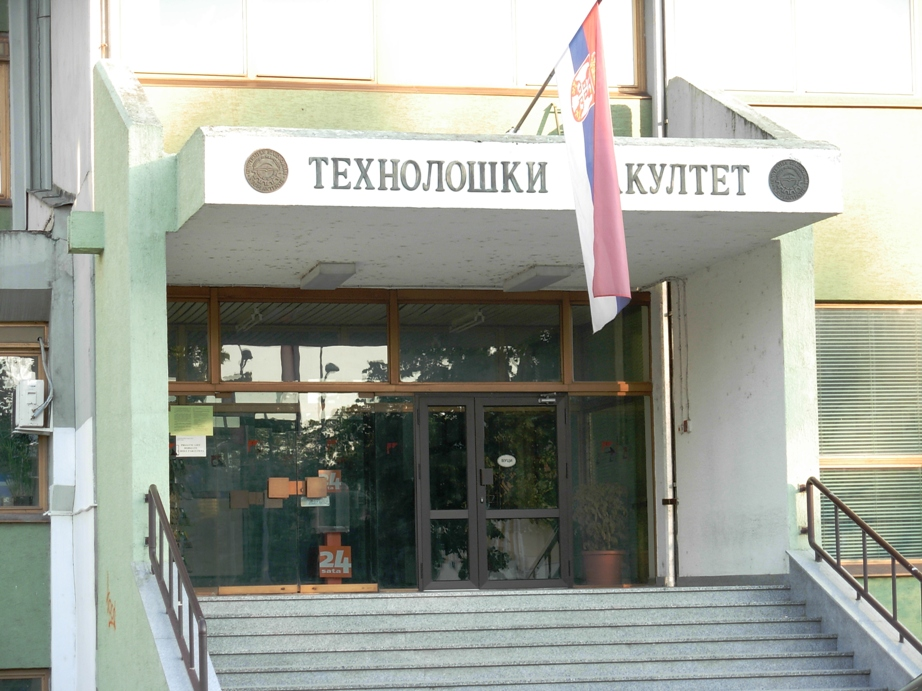
Faculty of Technology

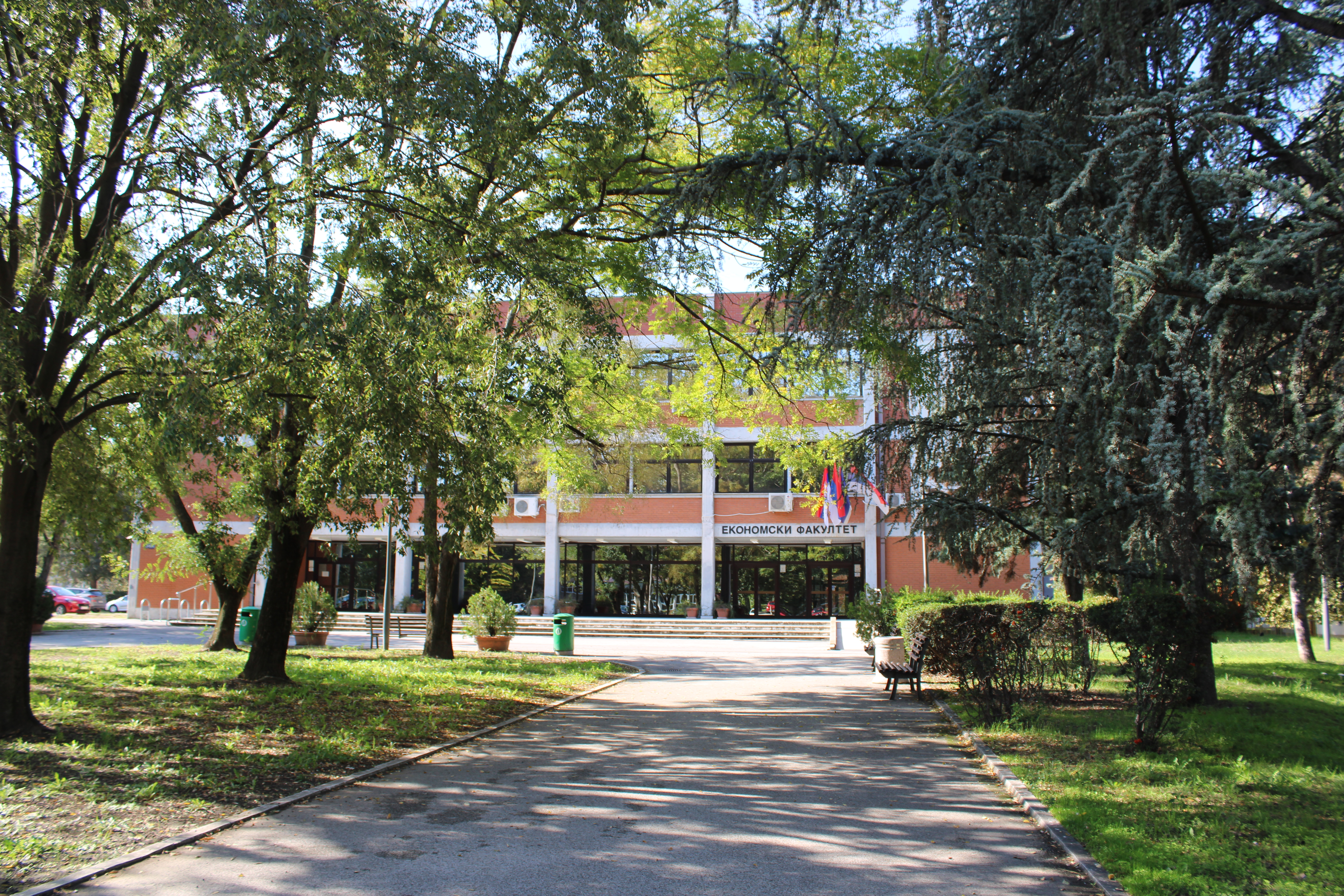
Faculty of Economics

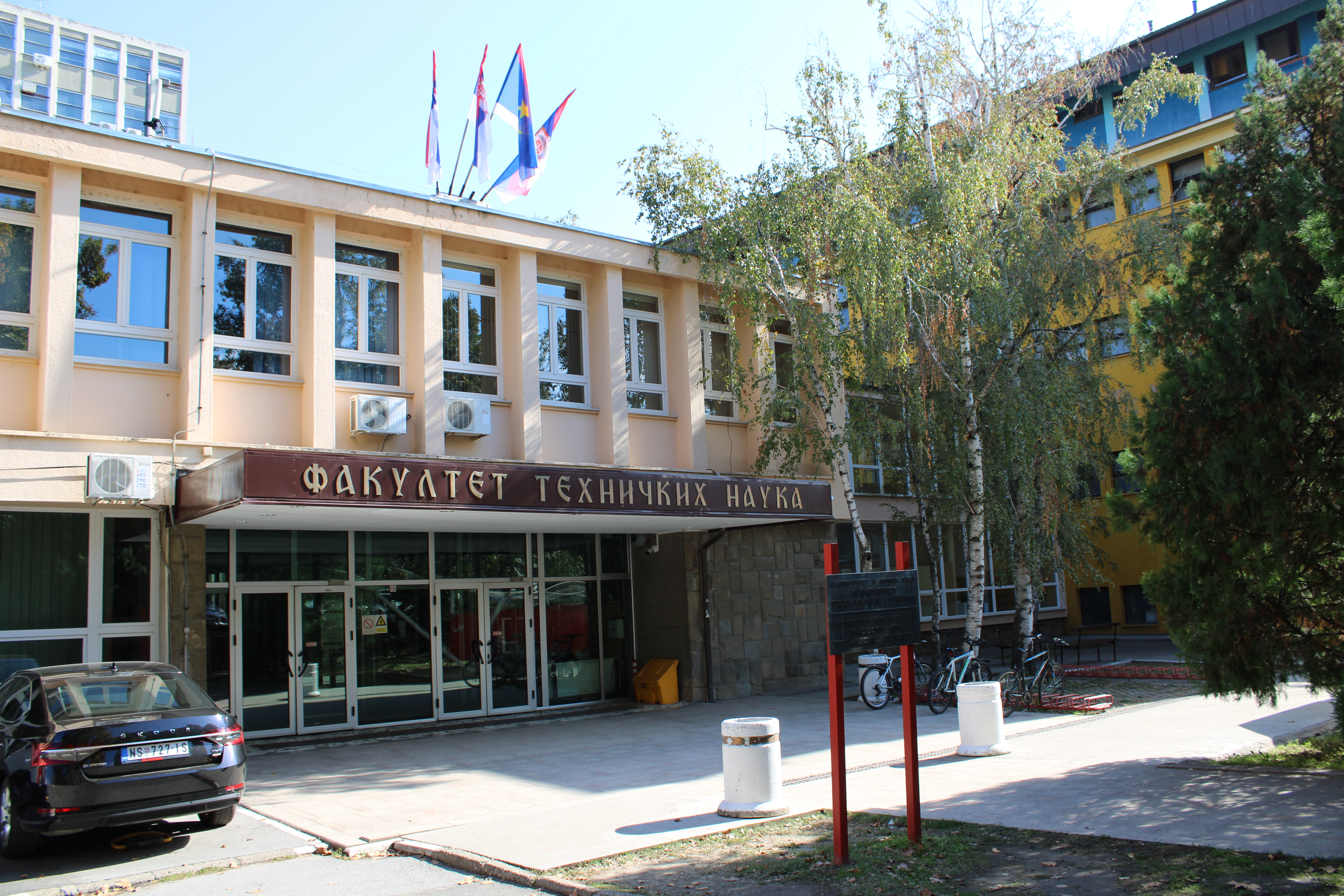
Faculty of Technical Sciences

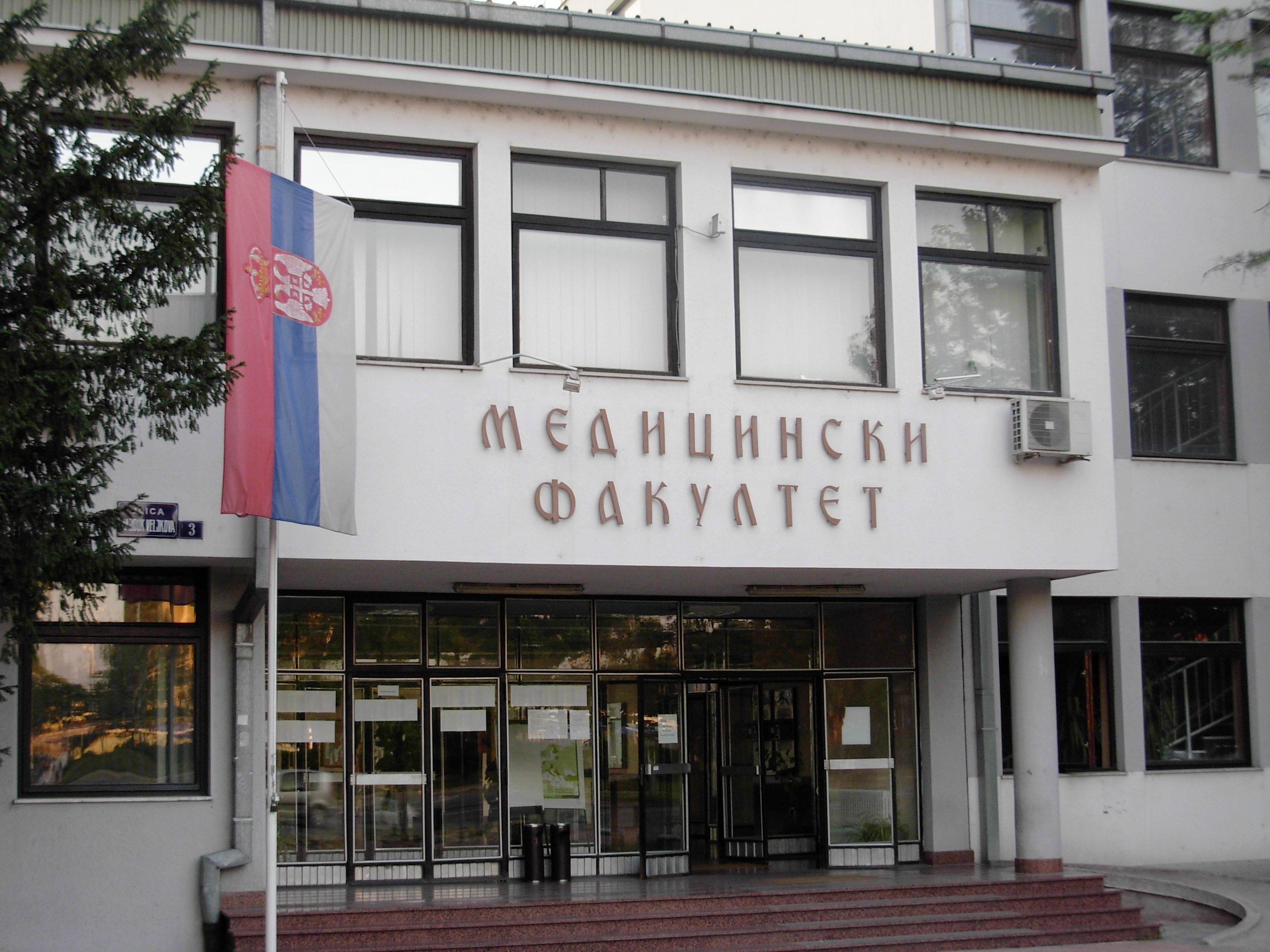
Faculty of Medicine

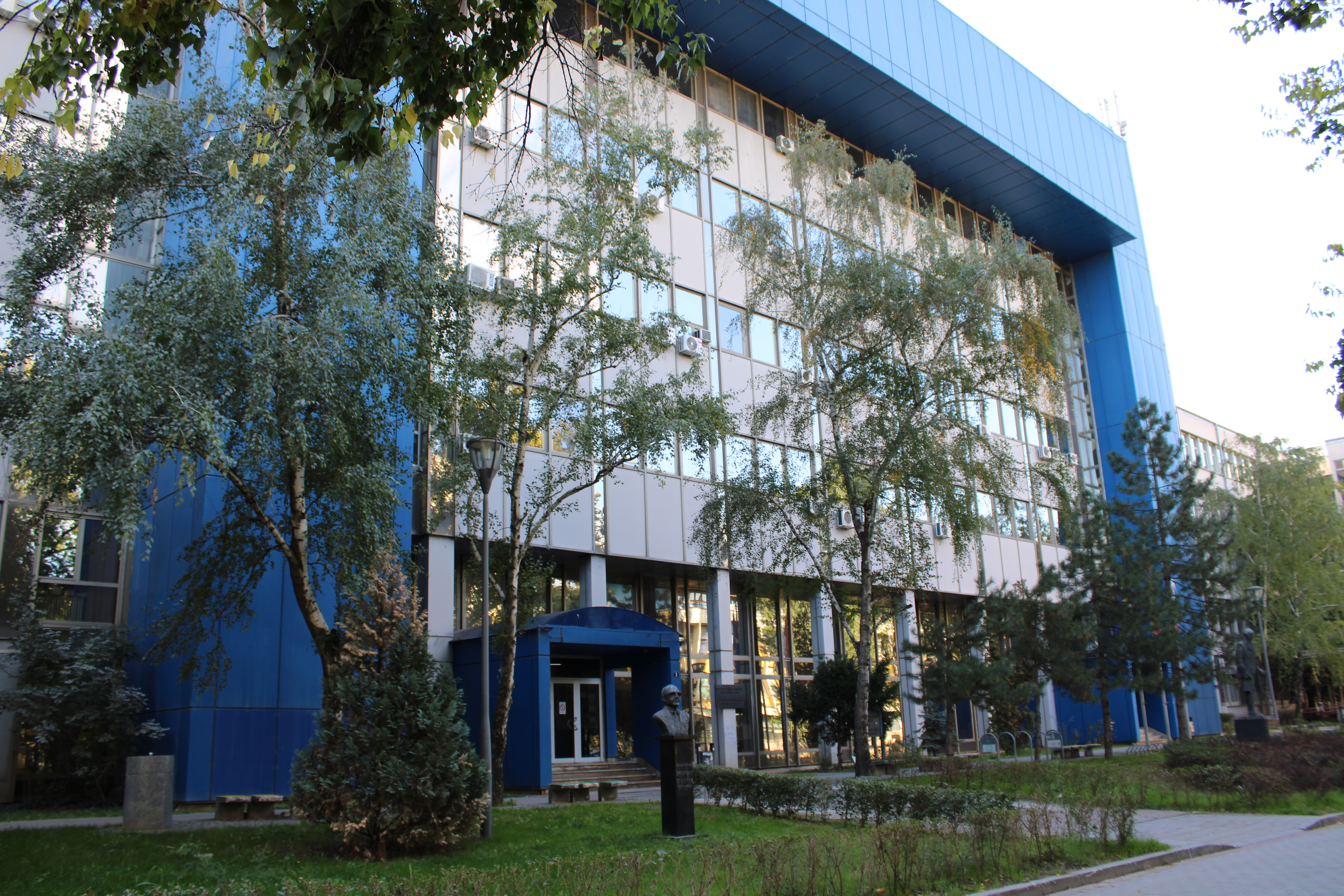
Faculty of Natural Sciences and Mathematics

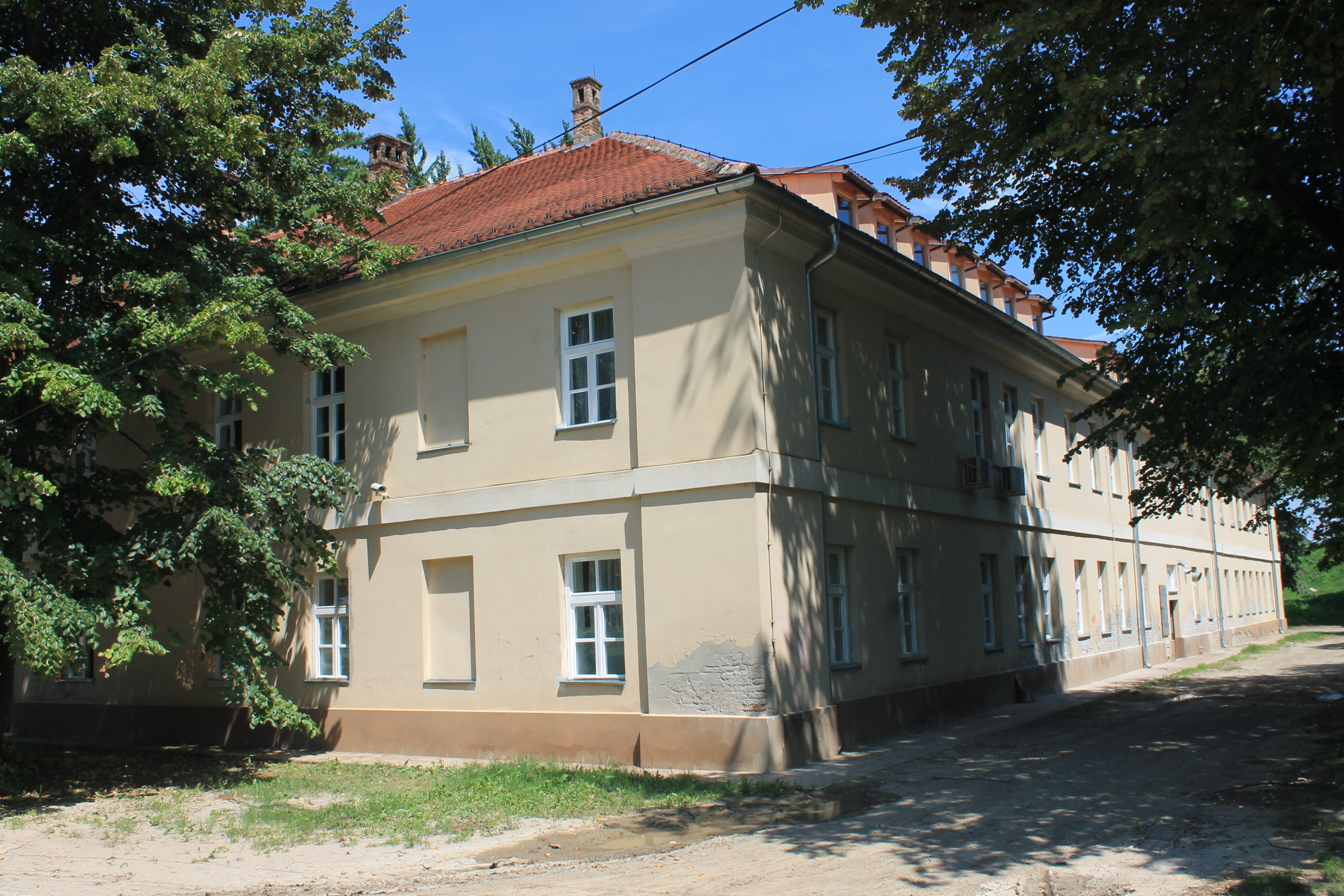
Academy of Arts

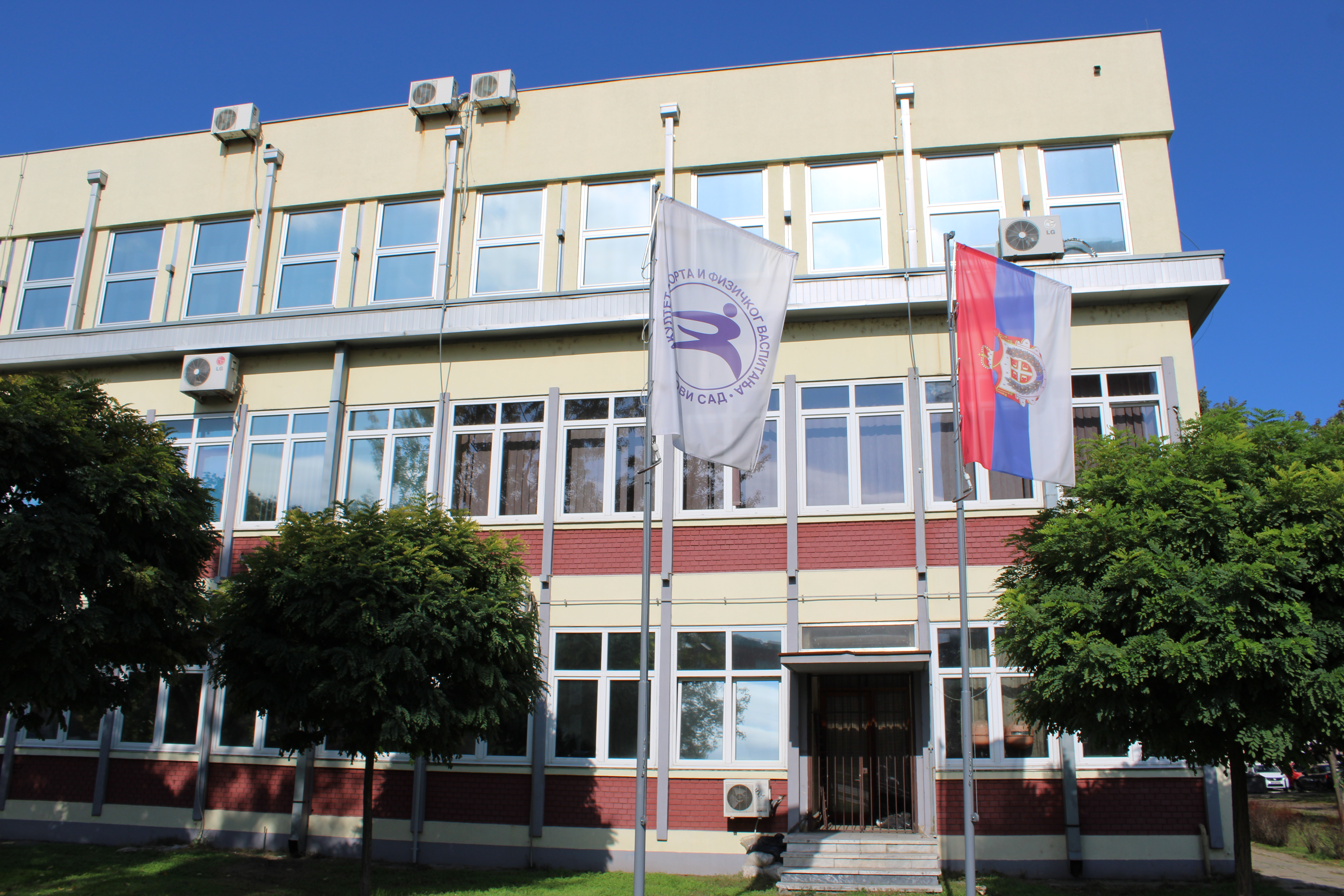
Faculty of Sports and Physical Education

== Studies ==
The University of Novi Sad offers around 320 accredited study programs at the level of Bachelor, Master, Specialist and Doctoral studies, carried out at its faculties and within its University Center for Interdisciplinary and Multidisciplinary Studies and Research.

About 56% of students at all study levels studies are women.

=== Science ===
Resulting from a special agreement on cooperation, researchers, professors and students have access to the Matica Srpska Library, the oldest Serbian scientific and cultural institution, founded in 1826, which offers more than three million publications.

The University encompasses around 250 laboratories. Of special significance to the strengthening of innovation potential is the Science and Technology Park Novi Sad. With the support of the Faculty of Technical Sciences, around 200 start-up and spin-off companies have been founded, mainly in the IT sector, employing young engineers who graduated from the University of Novi Sad.

Researchers from the University of Novi Sad have been the recipients of numerous international and national awards for technical innovations. The BioSense Institute, one of three research institutes, was proclaimed by the European Union as one of the thirty research institutions in Europe with the greatest potential in the field of bio-technologies. Its project ANTARES was the best ranked in Europe in 2016 within the program Horizon 2020.

In 2009, the Faculty of Law won first place in the moot court competition, which was organized by the University of Leiden at the International Court of Justice in the Hague. The students from the Faculty of Technical Sciences, which continue the tradition of the famous Yugoslav School of Robotics, have been named among the best in Europe, winning first place at the European Competition in Robotics EUROBOT 2019 and EUROBOT 2022, held in France, as well as second and third place in EUROBOT 2016. The students of the Academy of Arts and the Faculty of Sports and Physical Education have received numerous awards at national and international competitions.

=== Art ===
The Academy of Arts Novi Sad was founded in 1974 as one of the University of Novi Sad faculties.

The Academic Culture and Art Society of the University of Novi Sad "Sonja Marinković" is known for its successful performances at festivals in the country and abroad. Its Accordion Orchestra won the first prize at the World Music Competition in Innsbruck (Austria) in 2013 and is considered to be one of the best in Europe.

== Rankings ==
University rankings

Global – Overall
- CWUR World: 1121 (2025)
- QS World: 1201–1400 (2025)
- THE World: 1501+ (2026)
- USNWR Global: 1169 (2025)

Regional – Overall
- QS Emerging Europe and Central Asia: 113 (2022)

On Shanghai Ranking (ARWU), the University of Novi Sad is not listed among the top 1000 universities worldwide in 2025. This marks a shift from previous years, such as 2024, where it was positioned in the 901–1000 bracket. In 2025, it ranked between 201st and 300th place in Food Science & Technology it also ranked between 401st and 500th place in Agricultural Sciences. In 2025 on USNWR, the University of Novi Sad ranked 1169th globally. Out of all subjects on USNWR the University of Novi Sad it was best ranked in Food Science and Technology being 120th in the world.

== Notable alumni ==
- Poets and novelists Dragomir Dujmov, Mihajlo Kažić and Jovan Zivlak,
- American Slavist Wayles Browne,
- Bulgarian linguist Lyubomir Miletich,
- Croatian-American writer Josip Novakovich,
- Serbian-Canadian mathematician and computer scientist Ivan Stojmenovic.
- Serbian Ambassador to Israel Mile Isakov, and
- Hungarian politicians in Serbia Attila Juhász and István Pásztor.
- Bratislav Stankovic, biologist and lawyer, U.S. patent attorney
- Nenad Baroš, politician
- Gojko Palalić, politician

Among the best-known musicians are:

- pianists Rita Kinka, Mladen Čolić and Ratimir Martinović,
- flutist Sanja Stijačić,
- composer Mitar Subotić,

== Notable people ==
- Dorian Leljak, pianist and university professor

== See also ==
- Education in Novi Sad
- Education in Serbia
- List of universities in Serbia
