= Arbo Valdma =

Estonian pianist and music pedagogue (born 1942)

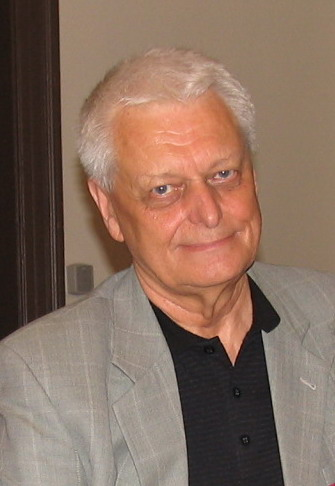
Arbo Valdma in 2007

Arbo Valdma (born 20 February 1942 in Pärnu) is an Estonian pianist and music pedagogue. He is a professor of piano at the University of Music in Cologne (Germany). He received his musical education at the Tallinn Conservatory (Estonia) under Bruno Lukk (himself a student of Artur Schnabel and Paul Hindemith) and later with Nina Emelyanova (a former student of Samuel Feinberg) at the Tchaikovsky Conservatory in Moscow (Masters and Doctorate degrees).

== Career ==
He performed as a soloist with multiple orchestras and with conductors including N. Järvi, K. Sanderling, E. Klas. A. Janson, A. Rabinowitsch, O. Danon, N. Debelic, I. Drazinic, A. Nanut, P. Despalj, A. Kolar and others. As chamber musician, he has performed with multiple musicians including Mstislav Rostropovich, Walter Despalj, Fern Raskovic among others. In 1984, he was appointed Professor of Piano and Piano Pedagogy and Head of the Piano Department at the University of Belgrade (former Yugoslavia). From 1989 to 1992, he was also Dean of the Piano Faculty at the Academy of Arts at the University of Novi Sad.

Vocational pedagogue, researcher, and author of multiple pedagogical publications, he has given more than 150 Masterclasses around the world in cities such as Moscow, Rome, Thessaloniki, Athens, Calgary, Tokyo, Montepulciano, Liechtenstein, Ohrid, Subotica, Belgrade, Zagreb, Novi Sad, Ljubljana, Kaohsiung, Dubrovnik, Bad Sobernheim, Cologne, Orlando, Las Vegas, Los Angeles, Atlanta, Sendai, and others. Since 2007, the "International Music Festival with Prof. Arbo Valdma" has been held in Fukuoka and Nagoya, Japan. Arbo Valdma was a founding member of EPTA (European Piano Teachers Association) Department in Yugoslavia (established in 1988); Honorary President of EPTA Serbia and an Honorary Member of EPTA in Estonia. In 1991, he was awarded Doctor Honoris Causa grade by Estonian Music Academy. Recently, he has been serving as an artist-faculty member specializing in piano at the annual Music & More SummerFest held in the city of Trebinje, Bosnia & Herzegovina.

His students have won a number of prizes at the most prestigious international piano competitions: Brussels (Queen Elisabeth), Vienna (Beethoven), Vevey (Clara Haskil), Cologne (F. Chopin), Epinal, Geneva, Lausanne, Leeds, Munich, Sydney, Vercelli, Washington and others. He has also produced a number of television and radio shows where often his students performed with an exceptionally high standard.
