= Gender paradox (sociolinguistics) =

Attested sociolinguistic relationship between gender and language change

The gender paradox is a sociolinguistic phenomenon first observed by William Labov, who noted, "Women conform more closely than men to sociolinguistic norms that are overtly prescribed, but conform less than men when they are not." Specifically, the "paradox" arises from sociolinguistic data showing that women are more likely to use prestige forms and avoid stigmatized variants than men for a majority of linguistic variables, but that they are also more likely to lead language change by using innovative forms of variables.

== Overview ==
William Labov identifies three main principles that in combination, constitute the gender paradox. They illuminate the juxtaposing roles of women, who display both conformist and nonconformist behavior in the treatment of linguistic variables.

=== Stable linguistic variables ===
The first of the three principles states, "For stable sociolinguistic variables, women show a lower rate of stigmatized variants and a higher rate of prestige variants than men." The principle gives the most general understanding of women's treatment of linguistic variables, in that when variables are not undergoing any change, women tend to prefer the standard form of the variable to the non-standard form. It is a commonly occurring phenomenon that sociolinguists have observed in a wide array of societies. Peter Trudgill's study of the (ng) variable in Norwich, England provides evidence to support this principle.

In his 1968 study, Trudgill studied the frequency of the (ng) variable among sixty random subjects and calculated the usage of the standard form [ɪŋ] versus that of the non-standard form [ən ~ n̩]. He classified his results into categories of class, style and sex. Women tended to avoid the stigmatized form and would prefer the standard form more than men did, which hold true for nearly all English dialects. Women were even more careful with their choice in variable when they spoke formally, which indicated a high level of linguistic awareness.

=== Changes from above ===
Occasionally considered a corollary to the first principle, the second principle states, "In linguistic change from above, women adopt prestige forms at a higher rate than men." These are language changes that individuals are generally conscious of. People are aware of the prestige associated with formal styles and thus are prone to hypercorrection – a product of linguistic insecurity. Several studies have shown that women are leaders both in eliminating stigmatized forms and adopting incoming prestige forms, and they do so at a notably higher rate than men.

This finding is widespread across languages and can be seen in examples such as (r)-pronunciation in New York City, the reversal of the Parisian French chain shift, and entire language shifts, like that from Hungarian to German in Austria.

=== Changes from below ===
The third principle is as follows: "In linguistic change from below, women use higher frequencies of innovative forms than men do."

Those changes, which generally occur below the level of social consciousness, are "the primary form of linguistic change that operates within the system." In these cases, women are the initiators and leaders of changes in progress.

The Northern Cities Shift (NCS) offers a clear example of women leading change from below. For instance, The Atlas of North American English provides data on the regression analysis of 56 speakers in the Inland North in which the most significant factor regarding sound change advancement is gender, with women being the leading innovators. Women-led sound change from below is particularly salient for new and vigorous changes, like that of the palatalization of /t/ and /d/ in Cairo Arabic.

== Explanations ==
Researchers in sociolinguistics have attempted to provide a unified account and explanation for the gender paradox, with varying levels of success.

=== Neurobiological view ===
One proposed explanation from J. K. Chambers is the notion that women lead sound change because of some inherent biological verbal advantage. Under that view, women command a greater range of variants and styles, despite similar gender roles, because of sex differences. That view is contradicted by the varying size of the "gender gap" and the fact that differences have not remained constant over time. Labov asserts that if Chambers's biological explanation were to hold true, it would need to produce a robust effect across generations.

=== Social capital view ===
Another possible explanation for women's leadership in language change is their greater sensitivity to the social status associated with certain variants. As women have historically been denied access to the standard economic capital available to men through education and job opportunities, that may have motivated the usage of prestige forms to help them gain social capital and advance their social standing, both consciously for cases of change from above and subconsciously for change from below. The notion that women's speech is in fact the "language of powerlessness" is supported by findings that some features of stereotypical women's speech were also used by men when in a position of subverted power.

However, women still consistently exhibit higher use of prestige forms even in contemporary societies with higher levels of gender equality. Studies of language variation in central Sweden show that gender differences in speech have been maintained or even increased since 1967 although recent legislation in Sweden has led to improvements in gender equality. Nonetheless, the legislation may be too recent to have any great effect on the power entrenched in language and the systemic and cultural sexism that might remain despite various new laws.

=== Network theory view ===
Gendered patterns of speech can also be explained by social network theory, which suggests that speech differences are accounted for by the differences between the social networks of men and women. Men tend to have denser and more local social networks, which are more conservative and resistant to change and result in higher usage of non-standard local variants. On the other hand, women tend to have more open and less local networks, which are more likely to use standard variants and have access to innovative forms because of weak ties to other speech communities.

== Complications ==
In addition to the difficulties that arise in reconciling the gender paradox itself, other complications have emerged in the methodology and interpretations that led to its discovery.

=== Ethnocentric data ===
Evidence of the paradox is widespread in sociolinguistic variation studies that use either sex or gender as a variable, but findings that support the principles are not universal. Most data in support of the gender paradox come from studies of Indo-European languages in Europe or North America, but studies done in Asia, Africa, and the Middle East countries often show contradictory patterns. For example, male speakers use the prestigious classical variety of Arabic far more than women even though women lead in the use of locally-prestigious standard variants. Men speaking Malagasy also lead in the use of their ideal speech style, which is characterized by non-confrontational indirectness, but the women are norm-breakers and use the stigmatized direct style that is associated with negative information. Those counterexamples suggest that the gender paradox could be limited to Western cultures or languages.

=== Stylistic differences within women ===
Several sociolinguists question the validity of making generalizations about a group as large as "women," which makes up roughly half the population of the world. Penelope Eckert argues instead that women are not using prestige forms to declare whether or not they are women. A single linguistic variable can be indexical of multiple traits and women (and men) can belong to multiple social groups, each with their own linguistic traits. Language variations that are chosen by their third-order indexical qualities on a personal, rather than gender-wide level, reflected in the fact that no two women speak exactly alike. Those findings challenge the idea that women's use of prestige forms is not necessarily something inherent in their biology but could also be an external third-order indexical quality more highly valued among women than men.

=== Social-constructionist view ===
Social constructionists view the gender paradox as questionable because many of the studies used as evidence fail to take into account the sex and gender distinction. When gender is mentioned at all, it is often used synonymously with sex. Statistics support the fact that women often lead language change, but their motivations for doing so cannot be determined by statistics alone. It is inconclusive whether it is something physiologically inherent that makes women more progressive in their language use or if the trend is instead an effect of the role of the female gender within society.

If a tendency towards language change is a product of gender, which is socially constructed, sociolinguistics should instead be focusing on the social aspects of femininity that are indexed by female speech. Tats view would also account for the inconsistency in results between studies done in western cultures supporting the gender paradox and those done in other cultures in where the results are less conclusive.

=== Shifting of standard forms ===
Variation among women could also be caused by shifting standard forms. In a 2003 study of the multilingual community of Palau, Kazuko Matsumoto and David Britain examined the functions of prestige forms among women of various age groups. They found that among Palau women of the parent and grandparent generations, the use of Japanese is considered a conservative behavior since it is used to preserve their ethnic home language. Among young Palau women, however, the use of Japanese is considered an innovative behavior because since they have been raised speaking Palau, Japanese is an prestigious foreign language, which is used to secure a job in the modern employment market.

== See also ==
- List of paradoxes
