= Final victory =

"Final victory" or "ultimate victory" may refer to:

- An English translation of the German term Endsieg, used to denote a victory at the end of a conflict
- Finvenkism, an ideology within the Esperanto movement (from the Esparanto phrase "fina venko" [final victory])
- Final Victory, a 1987 Hong Kong action film directed by Patrick Tam
- Ultimate Victory, the second studio album by American rapper Chamillionaire
