= Atanasković =

Atanasković is a surname. Notable people with the surname include:

- Anđelka Atanasković (born 1958), Serbian Minister of Economy
- Nataša Atanasković (born 1972), Serbian painter, conservator-restorer and writer
