= Milovan Stanković =

Serbian writer

Milovan Stanković (Serbian-Cyrillic: Милован Станковић; born 1969, Belgrade, Yugoslavia) is a Serbian writer and electrical engineer.

== Biography ==
Stanković studied at the Faculty of Electrical Engineering of Belgrade's University. He is employed as an electrical engineer at Telekom Srbija. Stanković published a business profile on LinkedIn (BT Parison Ltd.) without indication to his artistic work, there is a professional profile with contact details at ZoomInfo and his personal website represents the literary work only. He lives in his native place.

The author of two novels, three volumes with poems and a collection of short stories is laureate of the Isidora Sekulić Award (2001) and the Milutin Uskoković Award (2004). New York City is the location of the novel All About the Fuller Family (2001), which reflects on the American way of life and the American Dream from the perspective of a family. The main character of the story is an immigrant to the United States. The award-winning narrative From the Preacher's Book (Iz knjige propovednika; 2004) has been published in the short stories volume Stories from the Eustachian Tube in 2006. Some of his short stories have been also published in literary magazines such as Stremljenja (Aspirations), Koraci (Steps), Mali Nemo's Sveske (Notebooks), Polja and others.

The novel If You Become A Butterfly in the Next Life was nominated for the final selection of the NIN Award 2013. The unpublished manuscript has been also nominated for the final selection of the Miroslav Dereta Award of the same named publishing house a few years earlier. In a brief unexpected encounter, the fictional character Martin falls in love with a woman who is found murdered shortly thereafter. He is then accused of being the prime suspect in the murder. The location of the plot is Prague as a fantastically surreal background for the story, which already became a dark-mystical place in stories of Kafka and Perutz to world literary fame. The book of poems What A Dream Of Flowers was translated into Esperanto by Zlatoje Martinov.

== Bibliography (selection) ==
- Pločnici ljubavi (Sidewalks of Love), Književne novine, Belgrade 1996, poems, ISBN 86-7943-036-6.
- Noć u nama (Night in Us), Narodna knjiga–Alfa, Belgrade 1999, poems.
- Sve o porodici Fuler (All about the Fuller family), Narodna knjiga–Alfa, Belgrade 2001, novel, second edition Mali Nemo, Pančevo 2002, ISBN 86-83453-16-2.
- Priče iz Eustahijeve trube (Stories from the Eustachian tube), Stylos, Novi Sad 2006, short stories, ISBN 86-7473-300-X.
- O čemu sanja cveće (What A Dream Of Flowers), Prometej, Novi Sad 2008, poems, ISBN 978-86-515-0193-0.
- Ako u sledećem životu budeš leptir (If You Become A Butterfly in the Next Life), KOV, Vršac 2013, novel, ISBN 978-86-7497-222-9.
- Ptolomejeva pevanja (Ptolemy's Chants), KOV, Vršac 2018, poems, ISBN 978-86-7497-273-1.
