= Esperanto PEN Centre =

Esperanto PEN-Centre
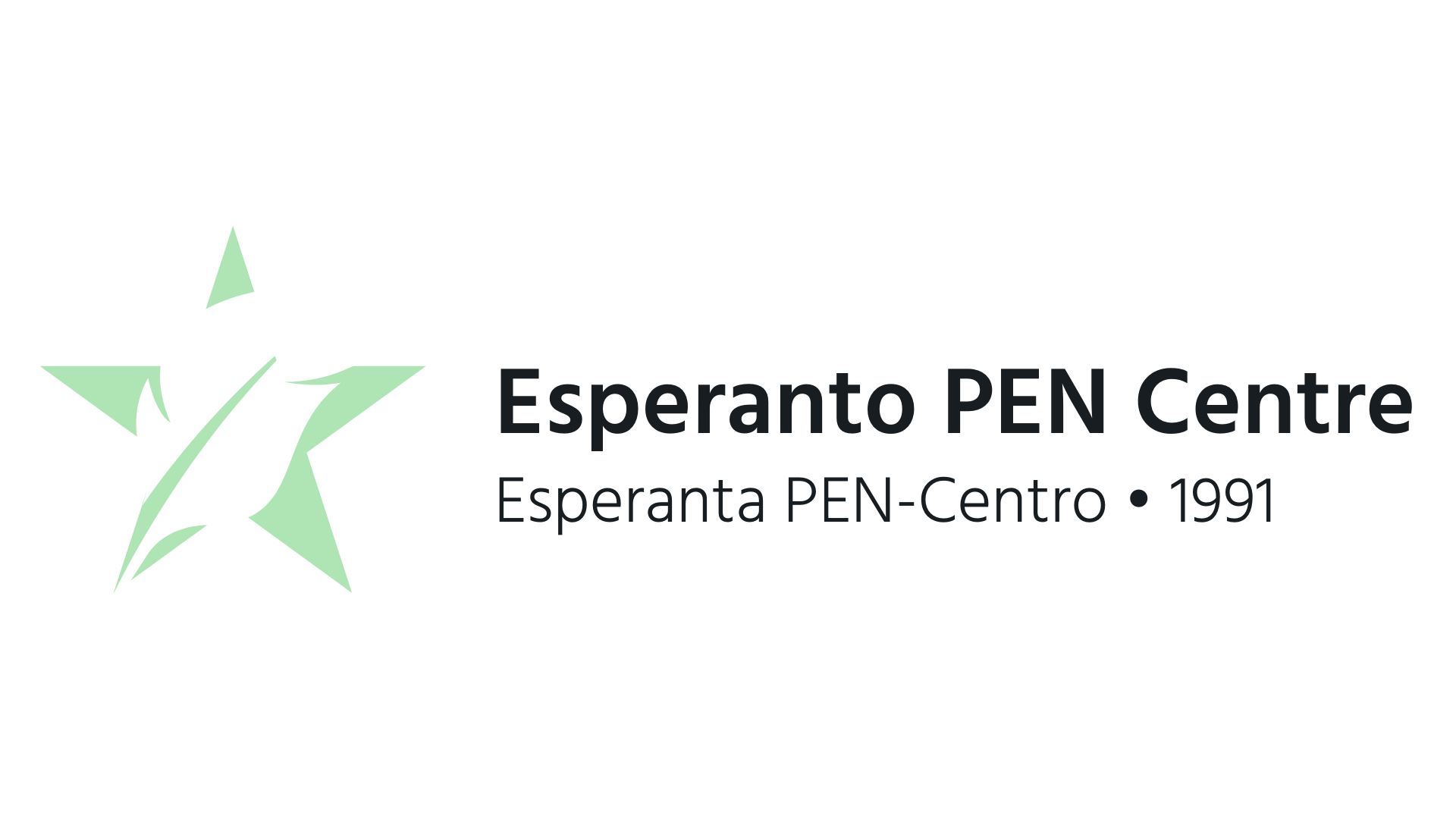
- Formation: 1991
- Founded at: Ticino, Switzerland
- Headquarters: Budapest, Hungary
- Official language: Esperanto
- Publication: Literatura Foiro
- Parent organization: PEN International
- Website: https://www.literaturafoiro.com/

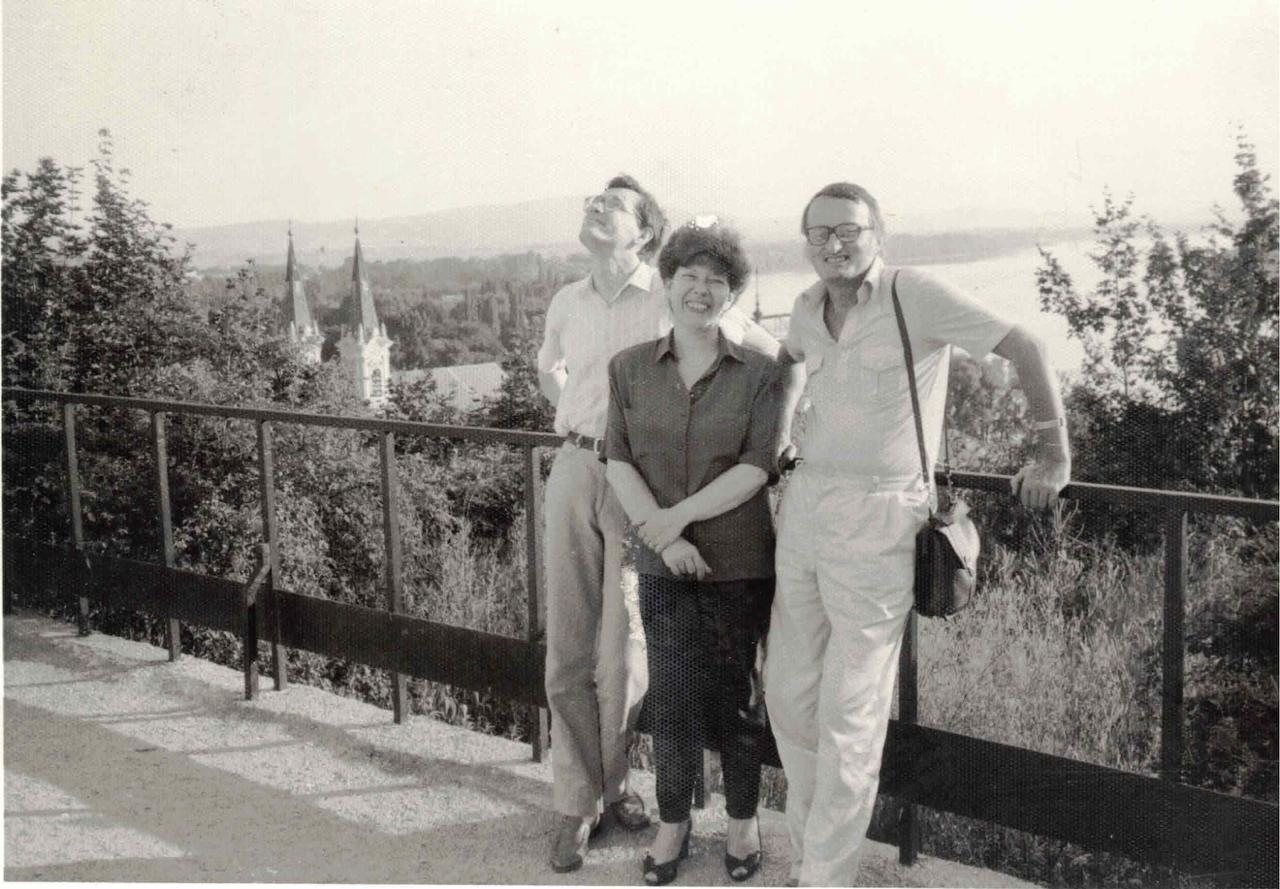
The founders of Esperanto PEN Centre.

Esperanto PEN Centre (Esperanto: Esperanta PEN-Centro) is part of the worldwide association of writers PEN International. Founded in 1991 in Ticino, Switzerland, it was admitted as a member of PEN International during its 1993 congress in Santiago, Galicia. It is currently based in Budapest, Hungary.

It is the most renowned association of Esperanto writers. Its official organ is the review Literatura Foiro.

== Work ==
The centre's activities are broadly literary and human-rights oriented. As stated by its statute, its main aims are to:

- Fulfil the objectives of PEN International, in accordance with its Charter and consistent with its principles and regulations;
- Encourage contact among professional writers in Esperanto and to promote the professional development of amateur writers;
- Illustrate and defend the values and originality of Esperanto literature among the literatures of other ethnolinguistic communities;
- Strengthen among its members the awareness of belonging to a unique community, comparable to a voluntary linguistic diaspora (as described in the Manifesto of Rauma), and consequently to adopt Esperanto not as an international auxiliary language, but as a transnational primary language of a minority.

== History ==
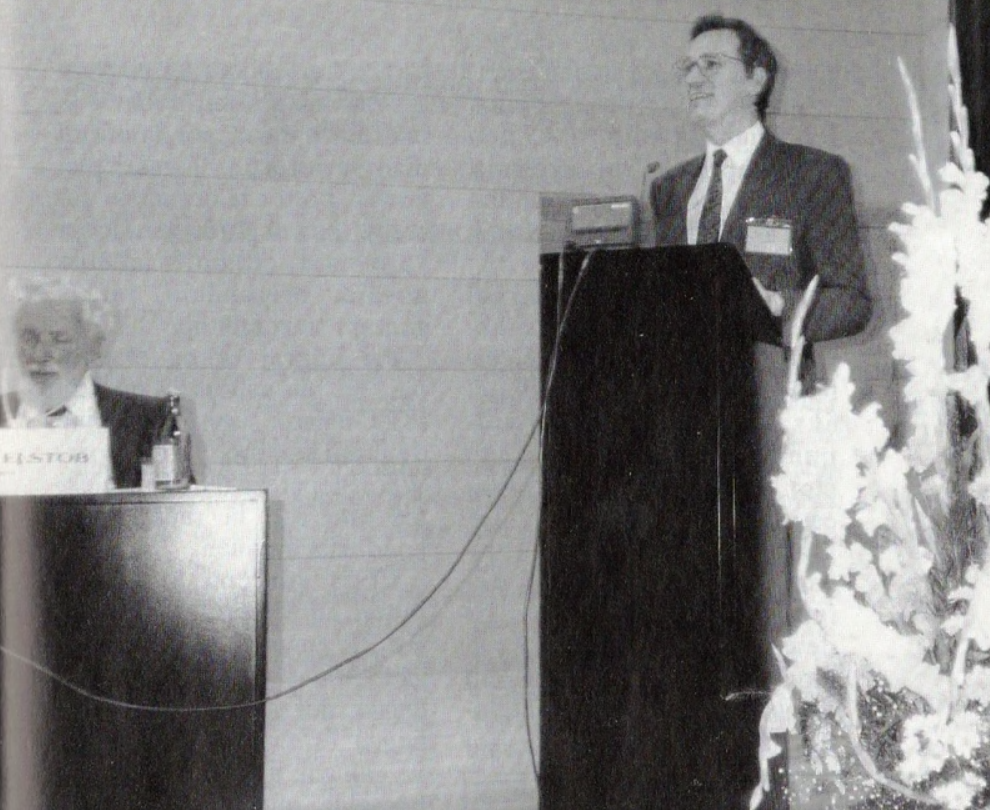
Giorgio Silfer (b. 1949), representing Esperanto PEN Centre in the 1993 Santiago PEN Congress.

The Esperanto PEN Centre was founded on 27 November 1991 by Perla Martinelli, István Nemere, and Giorgio Silfer, with Gaston Waringhien as an early member. Its establishment marked the formal organisation of Esperanto writers within the framework of PEN International. In 1992, the first formal assembly was held in Bellinzona, Switzerland, where the first leadership was elected: Nemere as president, Silfer as vice president, and Judit Felszeghy as Secretary. Heroldo de Esperanto and Literatura Foiro accepted to function as provisional organs of the centre, with the latter eventually becoming the definitive one in 1995.

At the 1993 congress in Santiago de Compostela, the Esperanto PEN Centre was officially accepted into PEN International, signifying official recognition of Esperanto as a literary language within the organisation.

"On 10 September 1993, Esperanto received definitive recognition as a literary language. From that day onward, anyone who claims that our language has no culture, no literature, is offending the highest worldwide authority in the literary field. From that day onward, it has been sufficient to reply to any detractor of our idiom: if Esperanto did not possess its own literature, its own culture, it would not have found its place in PEN International [...]. The PEN Congress perceived Esperantio not merely as a movement for the propagation of a noble philanthropic ideal, but above all as a self-chosen diasporic linguistic minority, with its own young yet original culture."

Since then, Esperanto has been acknowledged as a language of literature on equal footing with other literary traditions represented in PEN International. William Auld expressed his satisfaction with the achievement, which he compared, in a public letter, to the 1954 recognition of Esperanto by UNESCO in Montevideo. The Esperanto PEN Centre has been active in international congresses and conferences, participating regularly in PEN World Congresses, as well as other international literary events.

=== Nobel Prize nominations ===
The centre has also engaged in high-profile literary recognition efforts: in 1998 it participated, through its member Manuel de Seabra, in nominating William Auld for the Nobel Prize in Literature, drawing significant attention in international media. After his death, the Centre continued literary nominations, including scholars like Marjorie Boulton and later endorsing other candidates through its membership process.

== Gallery ==
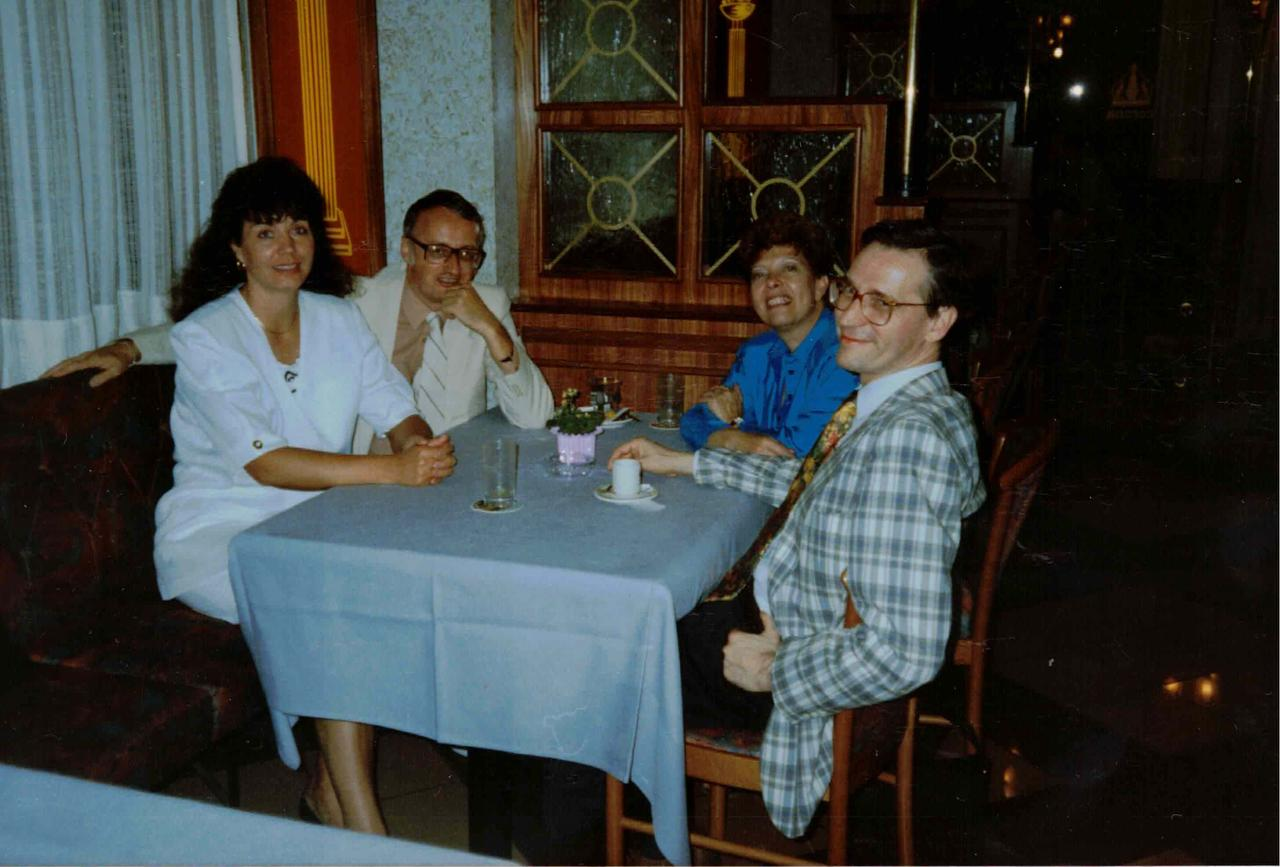
The Aris and the Nemeres, among the founders of the centre.

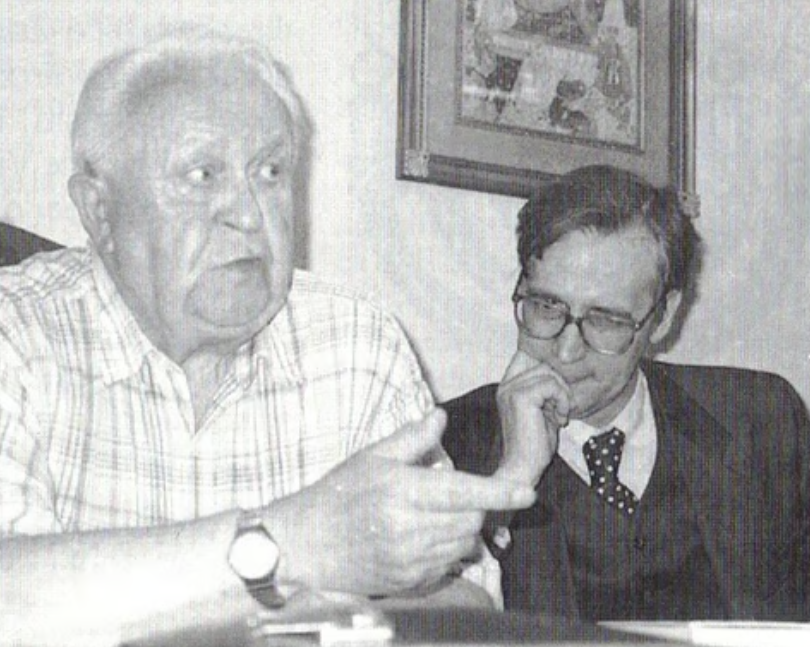
William Auld and Giorgio Silfer, in 1998, in Mantua.

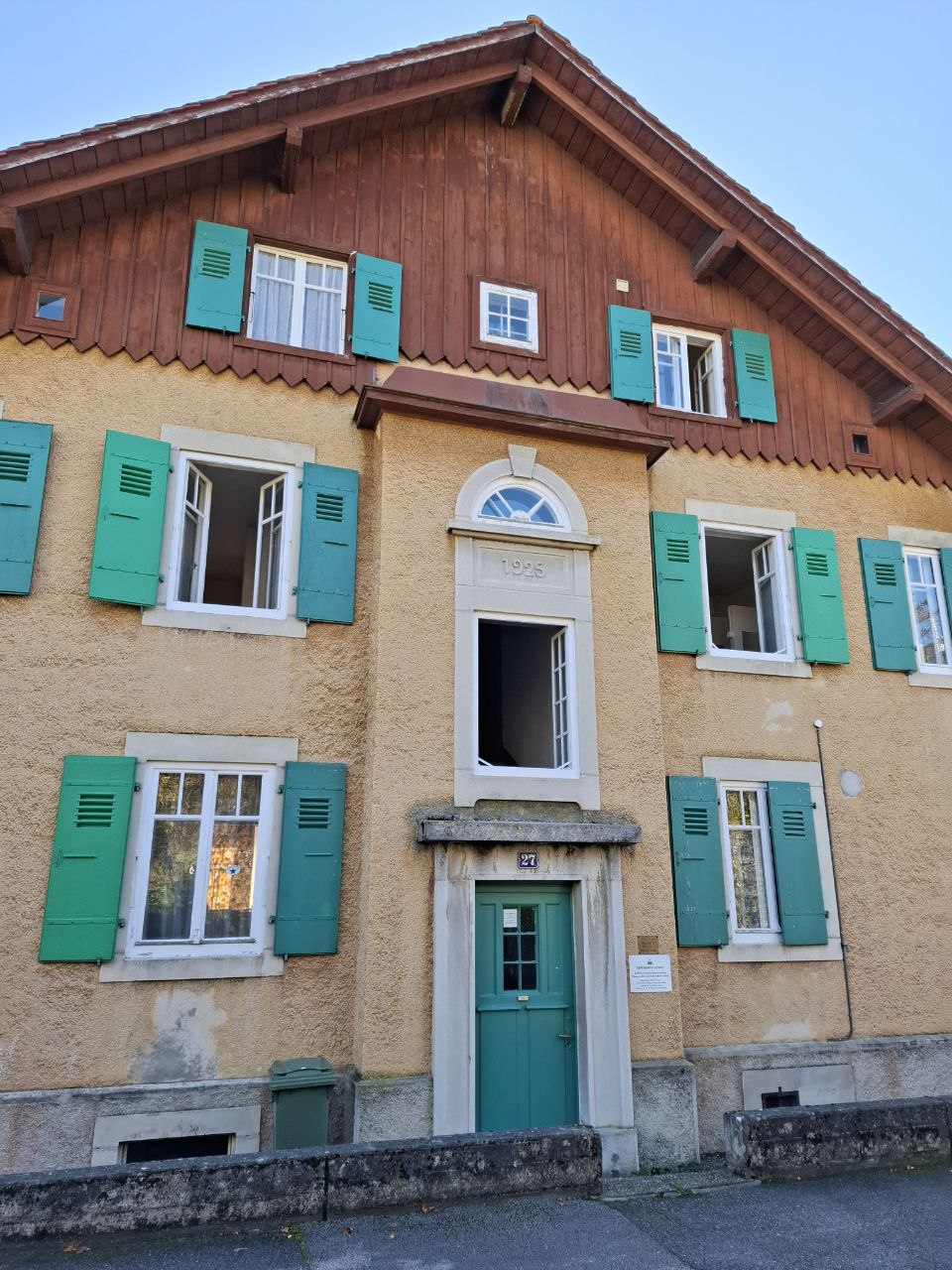
Façade of the Swiss Esperanto-House, La Chaux-de-Fonds, one of the headquarters of the centre.
