= Raumism =

Ideology

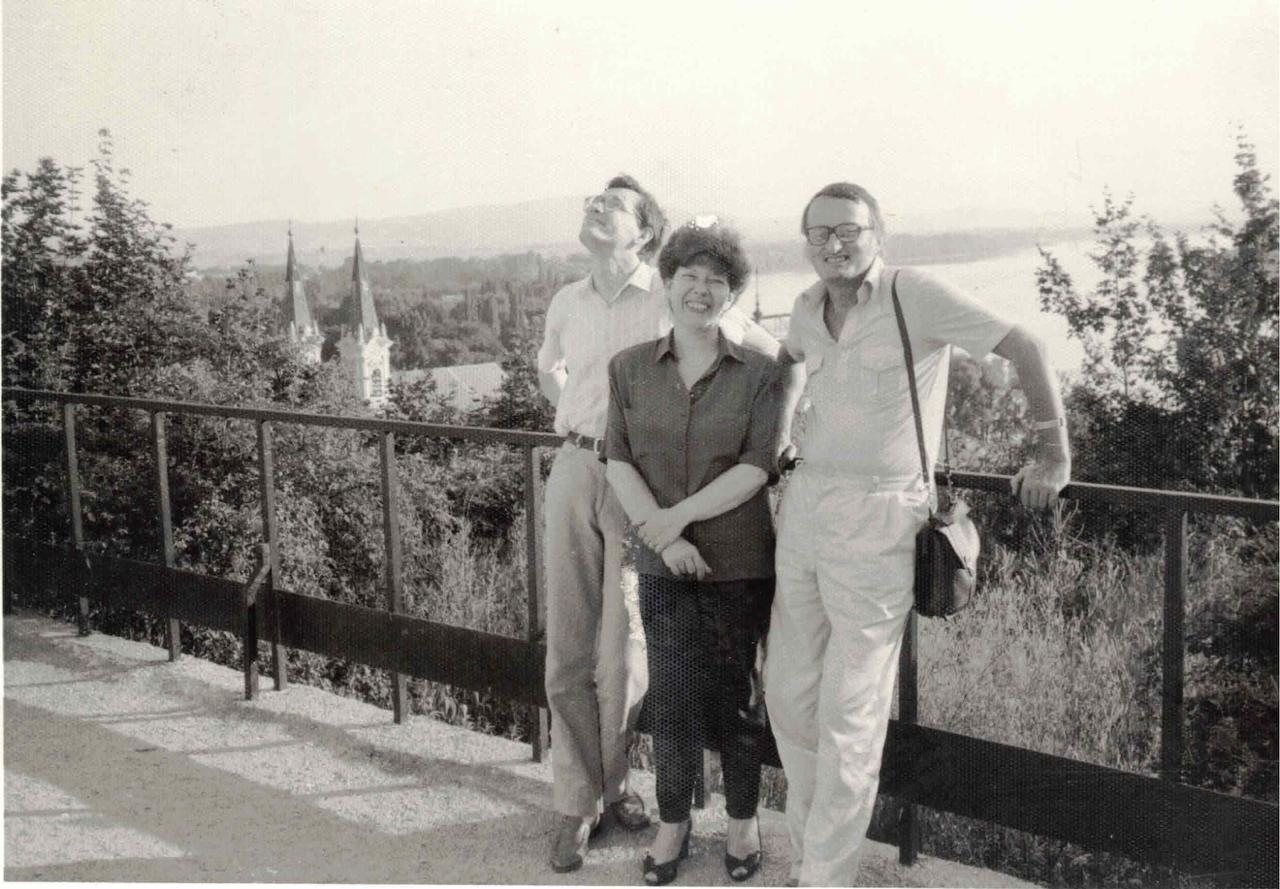
The founders of the Esperanto PEN Centre (Giorgio Silfer, Perla Martinelli, István Nemere).

Raumism (Esperanto: Raŭmismo [rau̯ˈmismo]) is an ideology beginning in 1980 with the Rauma Manifesto, which criticized the goals of the traditional Esperanto movement and defined the Esperanto community as "a stateless diaspora linguistic minority" based on freedom of association. Its name comes from the Finnish town of Rauma, where it was launched.

By doing so, Raumism tried to offer a different vision for Esperanto. Rather than focusing on having governments adopt it as an international communication tool, it suggested that the Esperanto was probably going to remain a minority language and that its culture was worth developing nevertheless.

The main achievement of this paradigm was the acceptance of the Esperanto PEN Centre by PEN International, which was itself a recognition of the literary value of Esperanto.

Literatura Foiro, established in 1970, is the most important Raumist magazine currently active.

== Rauma Manifesto ==
The Rauma Manifesto (Esperanto: Manifesto de Raŭmo) was ratified in 1980 at the 36th International Youth Congress in Rauma, Finland. Its first subscribers were Jouko Lindstedt from Finland, Giorgio Silfer from Italy and Amri Wandel from Israel.

It emphasized that official acceptance of the language was not probable and not essential during the 1980s and that it was necessary for the Esperanto community to have alternative goals. The manifesto emphasized the fact that the Esperanto-speaking community had itself become a culture, worthy of preservation and promotion for its own sake. It states: "We want to spread Esperanto to realize its positive values more and more, bit by bit (...)" – a fact that is not widely known. As a matter of fact, traditional Esperantism sometimes criticises Raumism, entailing that it is not interested in propagating Esperanto.

Esperantists from Zamenhof to Baghy had often described the Esperanto community as something more than a loose network of language learners, but less than a traditional nation, stressing its character as a voluntary, transnational cultural community united by shared ideals rather than ancestry or territory. Their reflections, as echoed in the Rauma-oriented discourse around Esperanto culture, treat the esperantistaro as a kind of self-chosen linguistic "people" or minority whose cohesion rests on common language, literature and ethical commitments, not on state institutions or ethnic homogeneity.

As Giorgio Silfer wrote in Kontakto (1976):

"Esperantists are the vanguard of the world, because they possess the means to solve the linguistic problem; but, like every vanguard, they have their feet in the past. For this means to be effective, one must free oneself from those ideas that either reduce Esperanto to a hobby or, conversely, exaggerate its value to the point of seeing in it the solution to all problems [...]. For the language to be effective, it must create a culture of international worth."

== See also ==
- Finvenkismo
