= Aleksandar Marčićev =

Serbian writer and librarian (born 1966)

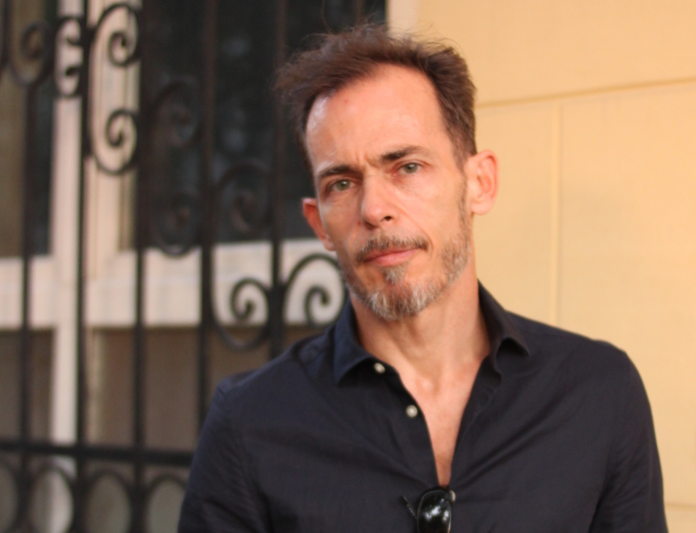
Aleksandar Marčićev, 2019

Aleksandar Marčićev (Serbian-Cyrillic: Александар Марчићев; born 11 November 1966 in Belgrade, SFR Yugoslavia) is Serbian Academic Librarian and Intellectual Romancier.

== Life and work ==
Marčićev completed Phd Education at Department of Comparative Literature and Literary theory of Belgradian Faculty of Philology, and is Chief librarian in Special library of Physical Chemistry in The University of Belgrade since 1999.

A Master of modesty, who can certainly be regarded as great unknown rebowned Man of contemporary Serbian literature; had hitherto been unnoticed by critics of literary scene in his native country apart from few exceptions. One of critics even used the claim that he would be a writer at border of obscurity and cult, in the sense of an unknown author who is single literary recommendation of elitist circles only. Zlatoje Martinov's review headed The Sins of Saint Max in literary journal Bagdala of same named Culture circle: Literary provocation sui generis, dealing dimensions of socio-political and cultural-philosophical aspects in Marčićev's work. In fact, the author and his literary confrontation with contemporaries of various generations, their and ultimately his own culture, has not been made easy getting to public acceptance with his creations. Although he had already been awarded for best Academic thesis of Philological Faculty upon graduation, then supported by Pekić Foundation Scholarship (2002) and temporary bursary of Ténot Foundation (2006), but total of nine publishers had refused to edit his first novel All the Lives of Zechariah Neuzinski (completed in 2002).

Marčićev writes his stories with in-depth knowledge on literature and its literary genres, art history, history of philosophy and the general history of Europe. The first three novels, collectively called as the Weissenburg Threebook (Serbian: Vajzburškog troknjižja), are a trilogy from the irrational cabinet of curiosities of human beings. The plots of the narratives take place in Weissenburg, a city between Byzantium and Pannonia and the name of the city is the ancient German name for Belgrade, also two of the protagonists has conspicuously a German name (Max Eichmann and Victor Eisberg; Neuzinski is a neologism, combined with the German adjective new and a Slavic name suffix), all deftly applied alienation effects. The writer plays masterfully with the literary genres of Bildungsroman and autobiography from the canon of classical literatures, and even the titles of his novels creates associative connections to works such as Augustine’s Confessions, Goethe’s Poetry and Truth and his Conversations with Eckermann, Mann’s Confessions of Felix Krull or Hesse's Demian. All three novels are metaphorical confrontations with the socio-political upheavals of his country and the entire Balkans region, biographies of fictional characters whose lives are told on the one hand autobiographically and on the other biographically by contemporary witnesses or by a demiurge. They are stories about the status of culture, its actual value, its traditions and the individuals who live in it, constantly re-create and influence it through their own activities and attitudes. German history has some examples of persons who have transformed the cultural cabinet of curiosities into a chamber of nightmares: Are these places of mind called Buchenwald, Srebrenica or Weissenburg? However, this real question might be a future provocation, because these places should be alienation effects of a fictitious culture only, which no longer exists in any present. The fourth novel tells about the lives of four friends from Voždovac, who have known each other since their youth, in the mirror of historical events and radical changes such as the death of Tito, the Gazimestan speech by Milošević, the Yugoslav wars, the NATO bombing of Yugoslavia and the assassination of Zoran Đinđić.

The novels All the Lives of Zechariah Neuzinski and Victor Eisberg: happy, despite everything have been nominated for the final selections of the Miroslav Dereta Award for the best unpublished manuscript by Dereta publishing in 2007 and 2009, the novels Saint Max and Zechariah Neuzinski for NIN Awards 2007 and 2008.

In any case, Aleksandar Marčićev has a famous German colleague who also worked as a librarian: Gotthold Ephraim Lessing.

== Works ==
- Gresi svetog Maksa (Sins Of Saint Max), Mali Nemo, Pančevo 2007, ISBN 978-86-7972-007-8
- Svi životi Zaharija Neuzinskog (All Lives Of Zechariah Neuzinski), Mali Nemo, Pančevo 2008, ISBN 978-86-7972-021-4
- Viktor Ajsberg: srećan, uprkos svemu (Victor Eisberg: Happy, Despite Everything), Mali Nemo, Pančevo 2009, ISBN 978-86-7972-041-2
- Je l' se sećaš kad je Tito umro? (Do You Remember When Tito Died?), Mali Nemo, Pančevo 2017, ISBN 978-86-7972-105-1.

== Awards ==
- Danilo Kiš Award 1997 for the best academic thesis of the Philological Faculty
- Brankova nagrada Matice srpske 1997 (Branko Award of Matica srpska)
- Mali Nemo Award 2007
