= University of Belgrade School of Electrical Engineering =

University faculty in Belgrade, Serbia

- Електротехнички факултет Универзитета у Београду
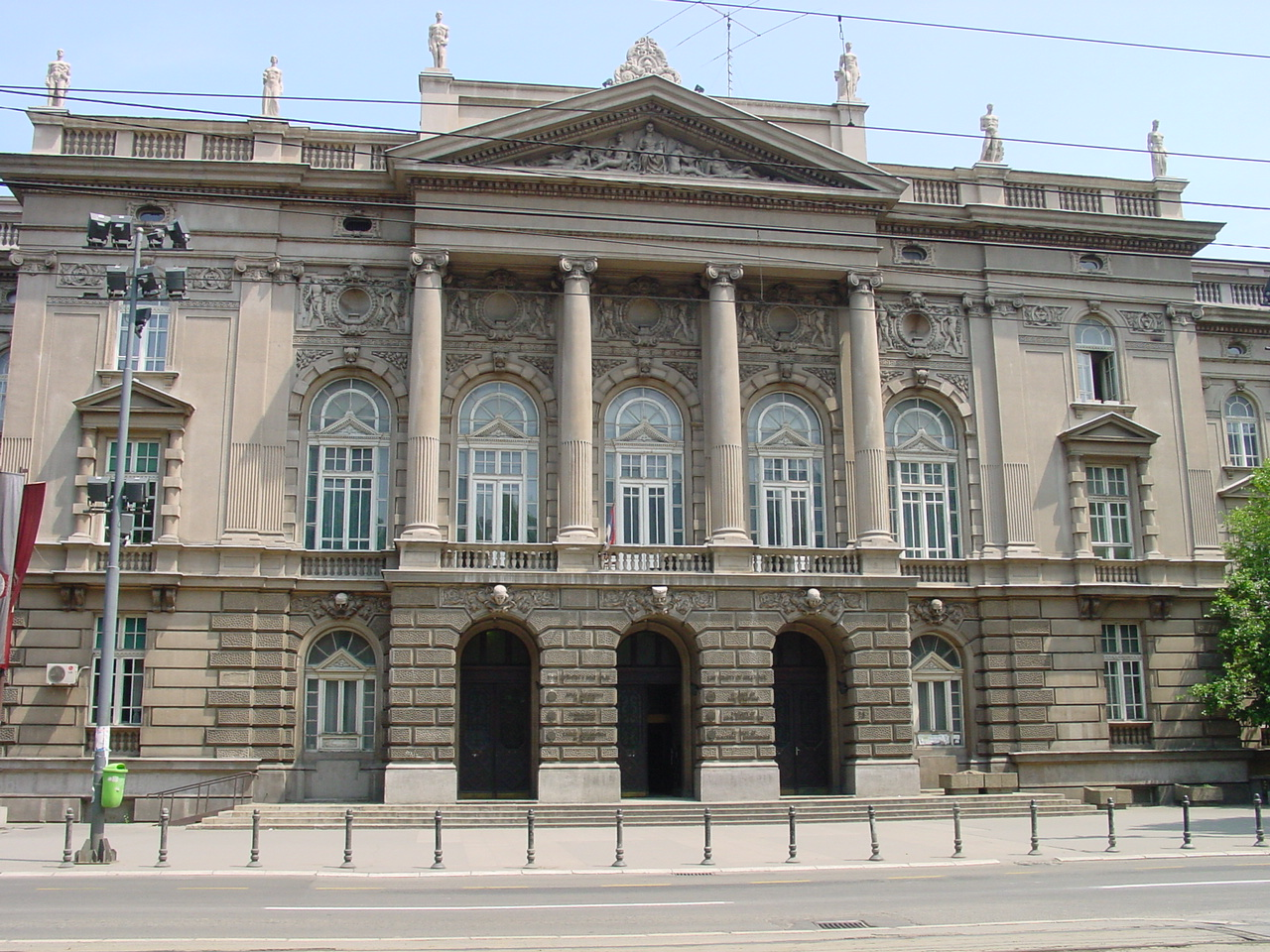
- Other names: ETF
- Type: Public
- Established: 1894
- Parent institution: University of Belgrade
- Rector: Vladan Đokić
- Dean: Dejan Gvozdić
- Academic staff: 161 (2016)
- Administrative staff: 138 (2016)
- Students: 4,690 (2018–19)
- Undergraduates: 3,549 (2018–19)
- Postgraduates: 814 (2018–19)
- Doctoral students: 329 (2018–19)
- Location: Belgrade, Serbia; 44.8057°N 20.4762°E
- Campus: Urban
- Website: etf.bg.ac.rs

The University of Belgrade School of Electrical Engineering also known as Faculty of Electrical Engineering (Serbian: Електротехнички факултет Универзитета у Београду/Elektrotehnički fakultet Univerziteta u Beogradu) is a constituent body of the University of Belgrade. The word Faculty in Europe stands for an academic institution, the sub-unit inside the university.

The first university level lecture in the field of electrical engineering in Serbia was held in 1894. Professor Stevan Marković was the first lecturer and founder of Electrical Engineering Chair within the Engineering department of the Belgrade Higher School. In 1898, Marković also founded the first electrical engineering laboratory in Serbia.

The school consists of a number of departments: Software Engineering, which is a separate department students enroll from year one, and the General Course, where from year two the students can select one of the following. Basic Electrical Engineering, Computer Science and Informatics, Telecommunications and Information Technology, Signal Processing and Automation, Power Engineering, Electronics Engineering and Physical Electronics.

== History ==
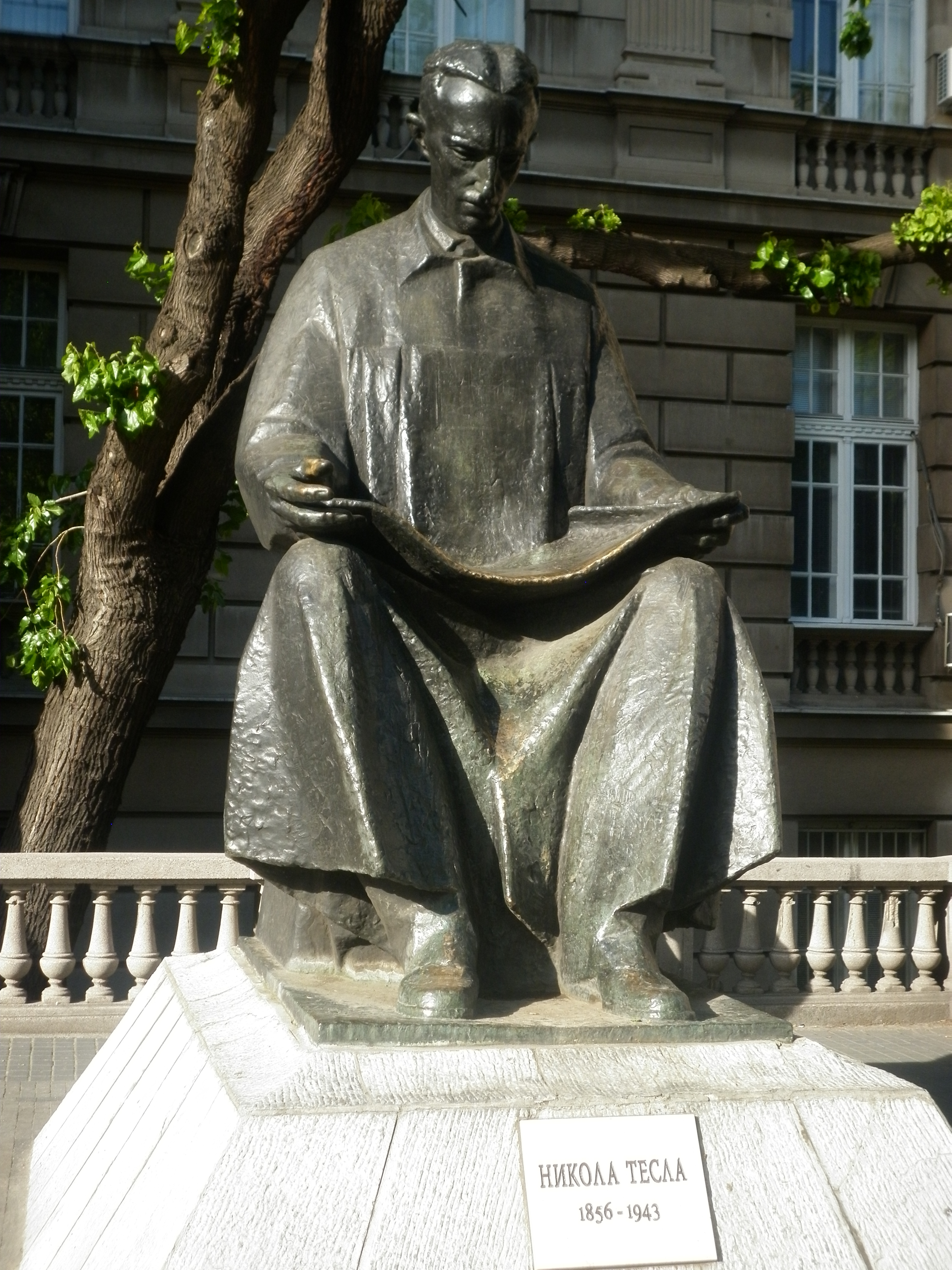
A Tesla monument erected in 1963 in front of the building of the School of Electrical Engineering by Frano Kršinić

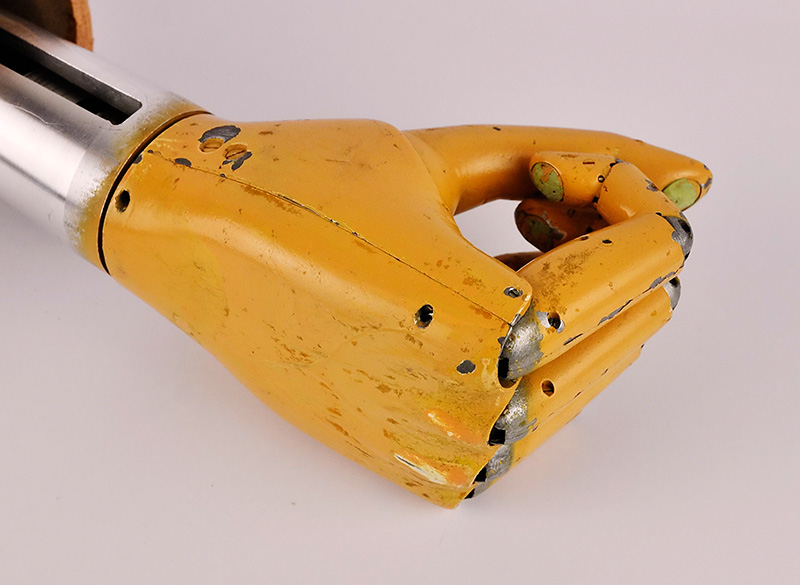
"Belgrade prosthetic hand" was the first prosthetic hand in the world, made in the Institute "Mihajlo Pupin" in Belgrade by alumni from the School of Electrical Engineering.

The first university level lecture in the area of electrical engineering was held in 1894. Professor Stevan Markovic was the first lecturer and founder of Electrical Engineering Chair with Engineering department of Belgrade Higher School. Only four years later, Professor Markovic also founded electrical engineering laboratory. Since then, this area has been studied at the Higher School, and later at the University of Belgrade which developed from it. First diplomas in this area were given in 1922.

The education of electrical engineers has been considerably expanded after reorganization of the engineering department in 1935. The mechanical department became Mechanical Electrical Engineering department, within which, in 1937, four new departments were formed- mechanical, aeronautical, power systems engineering and telecommunications. Due to the lack of lab equipment forming of the fourth department (telecommunications) was postponed until the end of the Second World War. In 1946 the Department of Electrical Engineering was formed. That department grew into the School of Electrical Engineering two years later, with its Power Systems Engineering and Telecommunications departments. In 1955 a new department was founded - Physical Electronics.

In following years the Telecommunications department was broadened in the areas of electronics, automatics and computer science. The fourth department - Computer science - was formed in 1987.

The most recent addition is the department of Software Engineering, which was formed in 2004.

Starting with the 2017/2018 school year, 720 students enroll on the first year of the faculty, of which 540 are enrolling at the electrical and computer engineering department and 180 at the software engineering department.

Professor Dr. Dejan Popović, a member of the Serbian Academy of Sciences and Arts.

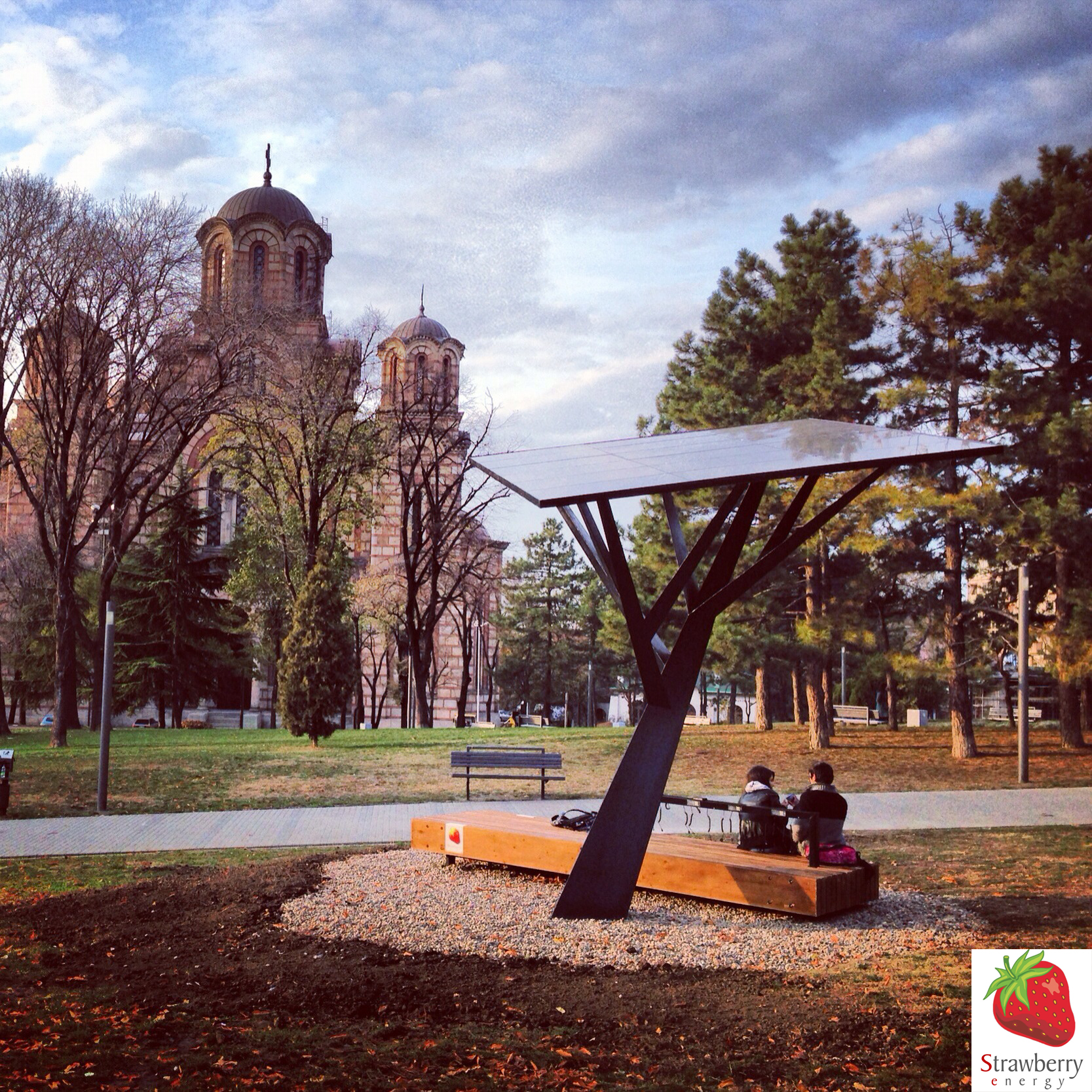
Strawberry Tree (solar energy device) was developed by Miloš Milisavljević (alumni of School of Electrical Engineering), founder of Strawberry Energy company.

== Notable alumni ==
Some of the school's notable students include:

- Nenad Bogdanović
- Petar V. Kokotovic
- Branko Kovačević
- Miroslav Krstić
- Mihajlo D. Mesarovic
- Josip Pečarić
- Dragoslav D. Šiljak
- Aleksandra Smiljanić
- Milovan Stanković
- Jasmina Vujic
- Rajko Tomović
- Dejan Popović
- Srbijanka Turajlić
- Predrag Osmoković
- Antonije Đorđević
- Predrag Pejović
- Slobodan Vukosavić
- Dragoslav Popović

== Nuclear engineering ==
School of Electrical engineering was the first institution in South-east Europe that started nuclear engineering program. After the departments of telecommunications and energy, third department was technical physics department (also known as applied or engineering physics) had two scientific groups, group for Nuclear Technology and group for Materials. One of the best known professors at this department was Dragoslav Popović, who constructed a reactor RB in the Vinča Institute of nuclear science, making Yugoslavia the 6th country in the world who successfully created the nuclear reactor, after US, USSR, France, UK and China.

Faculty still teaches all nuclear subjects such as nuclear physics, nuclear engineering, nuclear Energy, decommissioning and waste management, radioecology, dosimetry and radiation protection, detection of ionizing radiation etc. Beside subjects correlated to nuclear energy, faculty educate students for medical physics as well, giving them knowledge of nuclear physics applied in the human science over the subjects such as nuclear medicine, nuclear imagining, radiotherapy etc.

== See also ==
- University of Belgrade
- University of Novi Sad
- University of Novi Sad Faculty of Technical Sciences
- Higher education
- Tertiary education
- Electrical Engineering
- Electronics Engineering
- Computer Science
- Software Engineering
