= Zlatoje Martinov =

Serbian publicist and writer (born 1953)

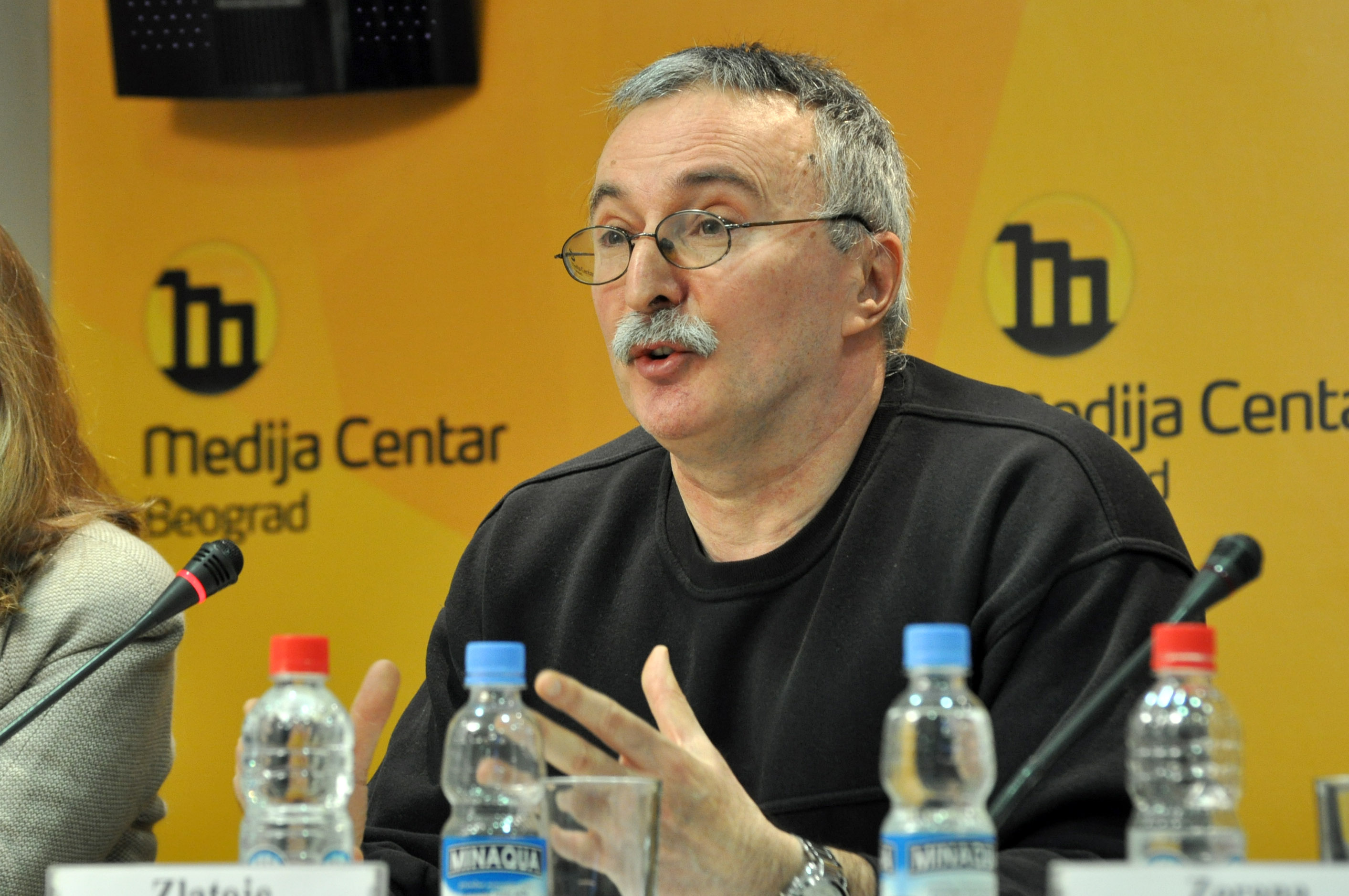
- Born: 16 December 1953 (age 72) Pančevo, SR Serbia, SFR Yugoslavia

Zlatoje Martinov (Serbian-Cyrillic: Златоје Мартинов; born 16 December 1953, Pančevo) is a Yugoslav and Serbian publicist and writer.

== Biography ==
Martinov studied economics (BS) at the University of Belgrade. He was director of the cooperative Res Publica, assistant of Nebojša Popov for several years and last editor-in-chief of the magazine Republika. Martinov's reports, reviews and essays have also been published in magazines such as Sveske (Serbian: Notebooks), Krovovi (Serbian: Roofs), Fenster (German: Windows) and some others. His critical articles reflected social, political, cultural and historical themes of Serbian society. Martinov was the director of the Documentation Center of Germans of Vojvodina (Centar za dokumentaciju o vojvođanskim Nemcima) from 1994 to 2002, and during this time he promoted cultural dialogue between Serbian majority and German minority. In 2000 and 2003, he participated as a Serbian representative at the Danube Swabian symposia ARDI in Vienna.

He is interested in Esperanto culture since several decades, member of the Esperanto PEN center in La Chaux-de-Fonds and editor-in-chief of the Esperanto magazine Literatura Foiro. Martinov is member of the Danube Swabian Heimathaus Foundation in Sremski Karlovci. The writer belongs to the committee of the Alliance of Anti-fascists of Serbia (Savez antifašista Srbije). He lives in Belgrade.

== Bibliography (selection) ==
Prose

- Osmeh Emi Majer (The Smile of Emi Majer; short stories), Banatski Forum, Pančevo 2002, ISBN 86-902963-1-X.
- Preljubnička biblija: priče (Bible for Adulterers: short stories), Mali Nemo, Pančevo 2004, ISBN 86-83453-40-5.

Poetry

- Svetu na dar: antologija srpske poezije za decu (A Gift to the World: Anthology of Serbian Poems for Children), in Serbian and Esperanto, Strategia, Belgrade 1996.

Essays

- Ideja, egzistencija i savremeni problemi međunarodnog jezika (Idea, Existence and Problems of Modern International Language), Društvo prijatelja međunarodnog jezika esperanto, Pančevo 1980.
- Esperanto: jezik i pokret (Esperanto: Language and Movement), Međunarodni centar zu usluge u kulturi, Zagreb 1985.
- U podnožju demokratskih propileja: izbori u Srbiji 1990–2000 (On the Base of Democratic Propylaea: Elections in Serbia 1990 − 2000), Res Publica, Belgrade 2000.
- Nemački uticaj na ishranu Srba u Banatu (The German Influence on Nutrition of Serbs in Banat), Mali Nemo, Pančevo 1997 and 2004, ISBN 86-83453-47-2.
- Hermeneutika književne estetike (Hermeneutics of Literary Aesthetics; collected reviews), Mali Nemo, Pančevo 2006, ISBN 86-83453-84-7.
- Sloboda kao ponornica: Republika 1907–2013 (Undercurrents of Freedom), Res Publica, Belgrade 2013, ISBN 978-86-86487-07-0.
- Gavrilo Princip – heroj ili terorista? (Gavrilo Princip – Hero or Terrorist?), Rosa Luxemburg Foundation Southeast Europe, Belgrade 2014.
- NDH i Nedićeva Srbija: sličnosti i razlike (NDH and Nedić's Serbia: Similarities and Differences), Orion Art, Belgrade 2018, ISBN 978-86-6389-078-7.

Articles

- Zašto Kosovo nije "srce Srbije"? (Why Kosovo Is Not the "Heart of Serbia"?), Republika No. 426-427, Belgrade 2008.
- Začarani krug (Vicious Circle), newsletter of Medija Centar Beograd (Медија Центар Београд), Belgrade 2011.

Drama

- Kobno pismo: tv drama (The Fatal Letter), Orion Art, Belgrade 2016, ISBN 978-86-6389-035-0.

Translations to Esperanto

- David Albahari, Eklampsio en remizo: Rakontaro, Serbia Esperanto-Ligo, Belgrade 1990.
- Milovan Stanković, Pri kio songes floroj, Prometej, Novi Sad 2009.
