= Philadelphia study =

Linguistic study

The Philadelphia study was a study designed to test the Curvilinear principle as referred to by William Labov, through careful gathering and analysis of research on language variants in five Philadelphia neighborhoods. His research goal was to "discover the social location of the innovators of linguistic change and therefore focuses on the embedding of individuals in their neighborhood".

== Methods ==
To test his hypothesis, Labov identified socially and ethnically central groups by gathering information on five Philadelphia neighborhoods through census data and initial surveys. He selected particular blocks in each neighborhood as an initial research point using a specific set of criteria including full occupancy of dwellings, high levels of interaction between people, and public spaces where interaction can occur. The field workers presented their research goals to the residents broadly and "without singling out language for specific attention" in the sociolinguistic interviews. The goals of these interviews were to gather social data on the residents, their block, and the neighborhood and analyze linguistic variants without facing the problem of the observer's paradox. That is, the field workers attempted to create an environment where the speaker would speak informally.

To gauge each speaker's social position within the community, Labov created a socioeconomic status index based on education and occupation, each ranked on levels from 0 to 6, where 6 was the highest level of education or occupation. He studied a series of "new and vigorous" vowel changes, including the fronting and raising of (aw) and (ey) and the centralization of (ey). He also studied the nearly completed changes involving (ow) and (aeh) and incipient changes such as the lowering of (e) and (ae).

== Results ==
Graph of the curvilinear principle, showing that the frequency of use is highest in the interior classes and lowest in the exterior classes.

Labov discovered that incipient changes did not provide a strong correlation with age or social class because these variants were too early in their stages of development to display any social significance. The nearly completed and most advanced changes displayed the most stability within the study and showed intermediate correlation with the middle classes. The new and vigorous changes—the focal point of the study—displayed the strongest curvilinearity and most clearly encompassed the linguistically innovative nature of the inner classes.

Through these Results, Labov asserted the truth and significance of what he named the Curvilinear Principle. With the social information gathered from the interviews, he discovered that it is not the education or occupation factors that drove the middle class to spur linguistic change. Rather, it was the central location within their communities—both socially and literally. They were not only central in the social hierarchy, but also in their local environments and interactions.

== Other factors ==
Labov considered age as a factor in his research along with social class, occupation, and education. He discovered in the majority of vowel variables, adolescents aged 13–16 had the highest values of use of innovative forms. To eliminate bias and errors due to other social factors such as age, Labov created the Philadelphia telephone study to corroborate the curvilinear hypothesis.

== Philadelphia telephone study ==
The telephone study was designed as a means to cancel out any possible errors that may have occurred in the neighborhood study, including but not limited to errors in selecting neighborhood representatives, errors in choosing neighborhoods to represent Philadelphia class distribution, and errors involving the physical research equipment. The telephone survey was done through random sampling of Philadelphia phone numbers, and therefore eliminated the biases that occur with selection of neighborhoods and interviewees. Due to the nature of telephone interviews, there was a possibility of error from the quality of sound, but this error was not present in the neighborhood study. The findings of the telephone study were closely related to the findings of the neighborhood study, strengthening the curvilinear hypothesis and leading Labov to the creation of the principle.
