= Radoš Kosović =

Serbian writer and translator (born 1984)

Radoš Kosović (Serbian-Cyrillic: Радош Косовић; born 28 May 1984 in Belgrade, Yugoslavia) is a Serbian writer and translator.

== Biography ==
Radoš Kosović grew up in his native place and attended the prestigious philological gymnasium, where he was taught with a focus on Latin and Ancient Greek. After his graduation with maturity diploma, he began studying Scandinavian languages and literature with focus on Norwegian and Danish at the department of Germanic languages of the Philological Faculty of Belgrade’s University and continued postgraduate studies at the University of Agder. In 2010, he obtained his master's degree with thesis on The word in the wilderness: rhetoric and nature of Jon Fosse, Tor Ulven and J.S. Welhaven. The young academic taught Norwegian language and literature as a junior researcher at the Philological Faculty in Belgrade from 2012 to 2014, and he is lecturer at KONTEXT foreign language center in his native town.

He is translator of numerous Norwegian and Danish works by Henrik Ibsen, Maria Parr, Linn Ullmann, Erlend Loe, K. O. Knausgård, Jo Nesbø, Merethe Lindstrøm, A. L. Kielland, Jostein Gaarder, Lars Svendsen, Espen Hammer, Tone Hødnebø, Dorthe Nors, Karen Blixen, Jakob Martin Strid, Kristian Bang Foss and Jens Bjørneboe. His extensive translation work is a noteworthy contribution to the Scandinavian-Serbian cultural exchange and he already received two renowned Serbian awards for literary translation therefore. Kosović said in an interview related to his work: Translating is the most intimate encounter with literary work. Kosović is a member of the Association of Serbian Literary Translators and lives in Vračar.

In addition to his translating activity, he has already drawn attention to himself in an artistic sense with two of his own literary works. The award-winning novel Carnival is a surreal narrative about one night in the lives of several characters, during a venetian-style and seemingly neverending carnival in an unnamed fictional city. The volume Eremites is a collection of short stories, for the most part inspired by the temptations of Saint Anthony.

In 2021, Kosović has been named as Translator of the Month October by the organization NORLA (Norwegian Literature Abroad), which is financed by the Norwegian Ministry of Culture.

== Works ==
Novel

- Karneval (Carnival), Mali Nemo, Pančevo 2011, ISBN 978-86-7972-073-3.
- Eremiti (Eremites), Mali Nemo, Pančevo 2012, ISBN 978-86-7972-079-5.

Translation (selection)

- Jon Fosse, I Am The Wind (Ja sam vetar, book edition 2019), Premiere at Novi Tvrđava Teatar, Čortanovci 2011.
- Karen Blixen, Out of Africa (Moja Afrika), Geopoetika, Belgrade 2014, ISBN 978-86-6145-168-3.
- Henrik Ibsen, Emperor and Galilean (Car i Galilejac), Akademska knjiga, Novi Sad 2019, ISBN 978-86-6263-267-8.

== Awards ==
- Mali Nemo Award 2011 for Karneval
- Miloš N. Đurić Award 2015 for best translated prose
- Aleksandar I. Spasić Award 2015 for best translation of non-fiction
