= Branko Kovačević =

Serbian academic (born 1951)

- Бранко Ковачевић
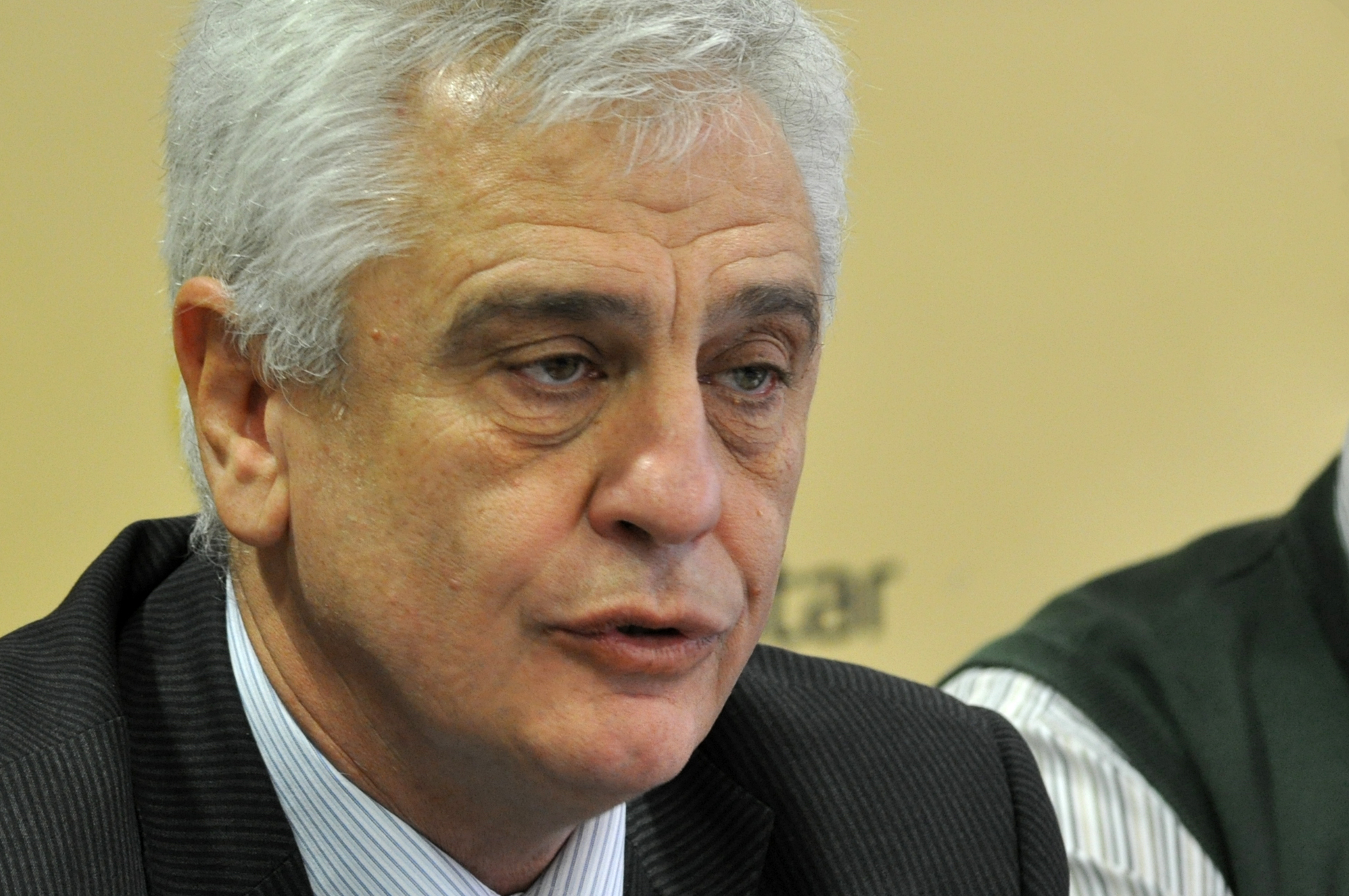
- Born: 29 June 1951 (age 74); Belgrade, Yugoslavia
- Occupation: Academic
- Known for: Rector of the University of Belgrade

Branko D. Kovačević (Serbian: Бранко Ковачевић; born 29 June 1951) is a Serbian academic. He served as the rector of the University of Belgrade from 2006 to 2012.

== Education and career ==
He received the B.Sc., M.Sc., and Ph.D. degrees from the University of Belgrade Faculty of Electrical Engineering in 1975, 1980, and 1984, respectively. He is currently a full professor of the Faculty of Electrical Engineering, University of Belgrade, teaching courses in control systems theory and its applications.

He is the President of ETRAN Section for Automatic Control, the President of ETRAN Program committee, and the Editor in chief of the Journal of Automatic Control (published by the Belgrade University Press).

In December 2006, he became rector of the University of Belgrade. He stayed on that position until September 2012, and later returned to his former dean office of the Faculty of Electrical Engineering.

In 2014, he was named the President of the Supervisory Board of Elektroprivreda Srbije (EPS).

== Honours and awards ==
He was awarded:

- The Engineers Prize of the Economic Council of Belgrade
- The Dušan Mitosis Prize of the Yugoslav Society of Electrical Engineers (ETRAN)
- The Branko Raković Prize of the Faculty of Electrical Engineering
- The Outstanding Research Prize of the Institute of Applied Mathematics and Electronics
- The Teaching Prize of the University Students Council.

Academic offices
Preceded by Dejan Popović	Rector of the University of Belgrade; 2006–2012	Succeeded by Vladimir Bumbaširević
