= Orlić =

Orlić is a Serbo-Croatian surname, derived from the word orao, meaning "eagle". It may refer to:

- Mila Orlić, Croatian historian and co-author of Boris Pahor
- Milan Orlić, Serbian poet, prose writer and essayist
- Mirko Orlić, Croatian scientist
- Slobodan Orlić, Serbian politician
- Tihomir "Tiho" Orlić, Croatian musician
- Vladimir Orlić, Serbian politician
- Vlaho Orlić, Yugoslav water polo player and manager

== See also ==
- Orlović and Orlić families
