= Literatura Foiro =

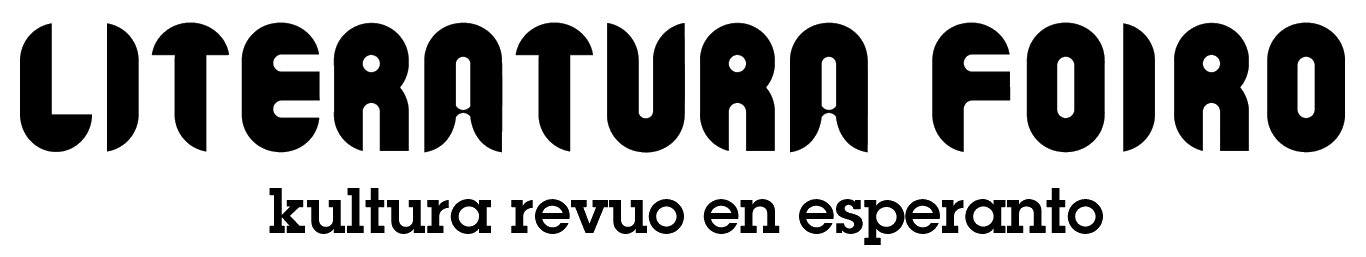

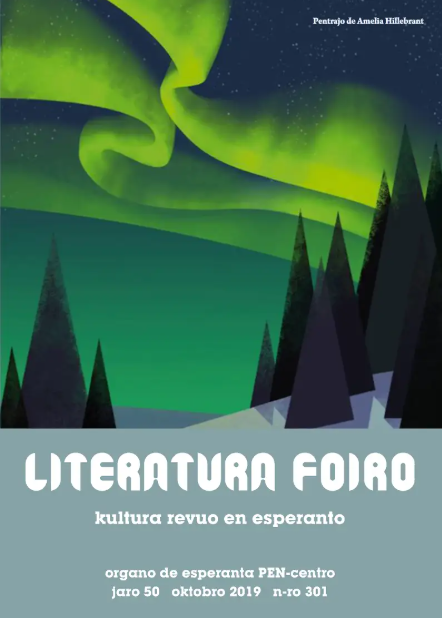
- Literatura Foiro Issue 301, cover dated February 2019
- Editors-in-Chief: Alessio Giordano, Perla Martinelli
- Categories: Literature, Esperanto
- Frequency: 6 per year
- Founded: 1970; 56 years ago
- First issue: July 1970
- Company: Kooperativo de Literatura Foiro
- Country: Italy
- Based in: La Chaux-de-Fonds, Canton Neuchatel, Switzerland
- Language: Esperanto
- Website: www.literaturafoiro.com
- ISSN: 0393-2907

Literatura Foiro (English: Literary Fair) is a bi-monthly periodical of Esperanto culture. It is one of the most relevant reviews aligned with the Esperanto Citizenry, and the longest-running literary review in the history of Esperanto literature.

It has been the official magazine of the Esperanto PEN Centre, part of PEN International, since 1991. The magazine publishes articles on international literature, cinema, music, performing arts, sociology, linguistics and philosophy.

== History ==
In 1970, the magazine was founded by the literature circle La Patrolo in Milan. The first issue was modest in size but signalled a commitment to engaging with contemporary cultural topics in Esperanto. The founders were mainly young intellectuals from Italy and Ticino.

In the mid-1970s, the editorial activities expanded beyond Italy, with editorial teams emerging in Finland and Switzerland. By 1980, editors and contributors from various countries formalised the organisation as the Kooperativo de Literatura Foiro (LF-koop) in La Chaux-de-Fonds, Switzerland. From that point on, the magazine continued under the umbrella of this cooperative, gradually becoming internationally oriented in its editorial structure and production.

The Rauma Manifesto, founding document of Raumism, was first printed in and primarily promoted by Literatura Foiro.

Throughout the years the review was based in various cities across Europe. Its current headquarters are in La Chaux-de-Fonds.

== Gallery ==
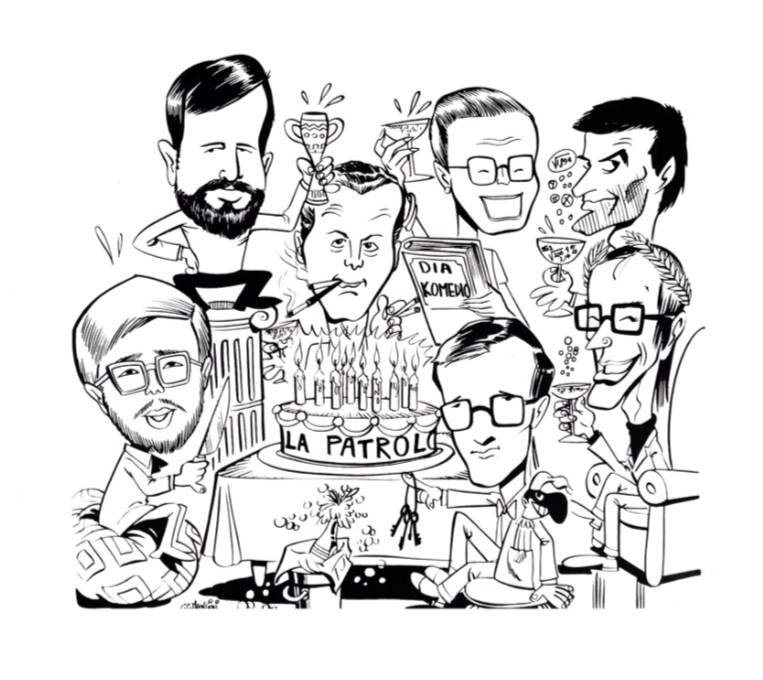
Caricature of La Patrolo.

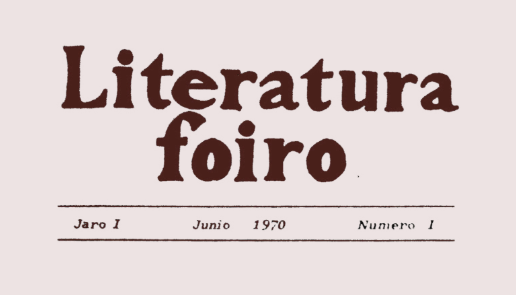
Header of the first issue (June 1970).

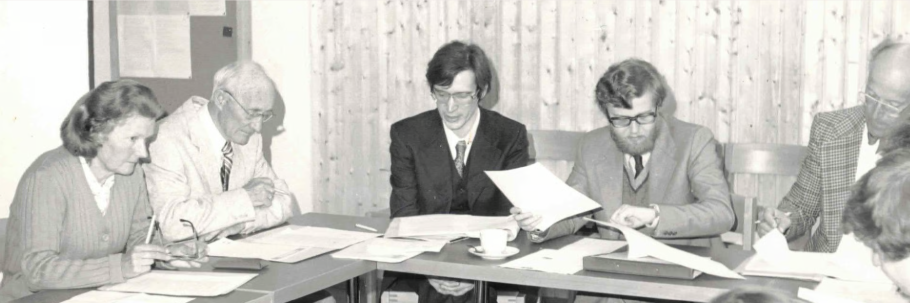
Founding ceremony of LF-koop.

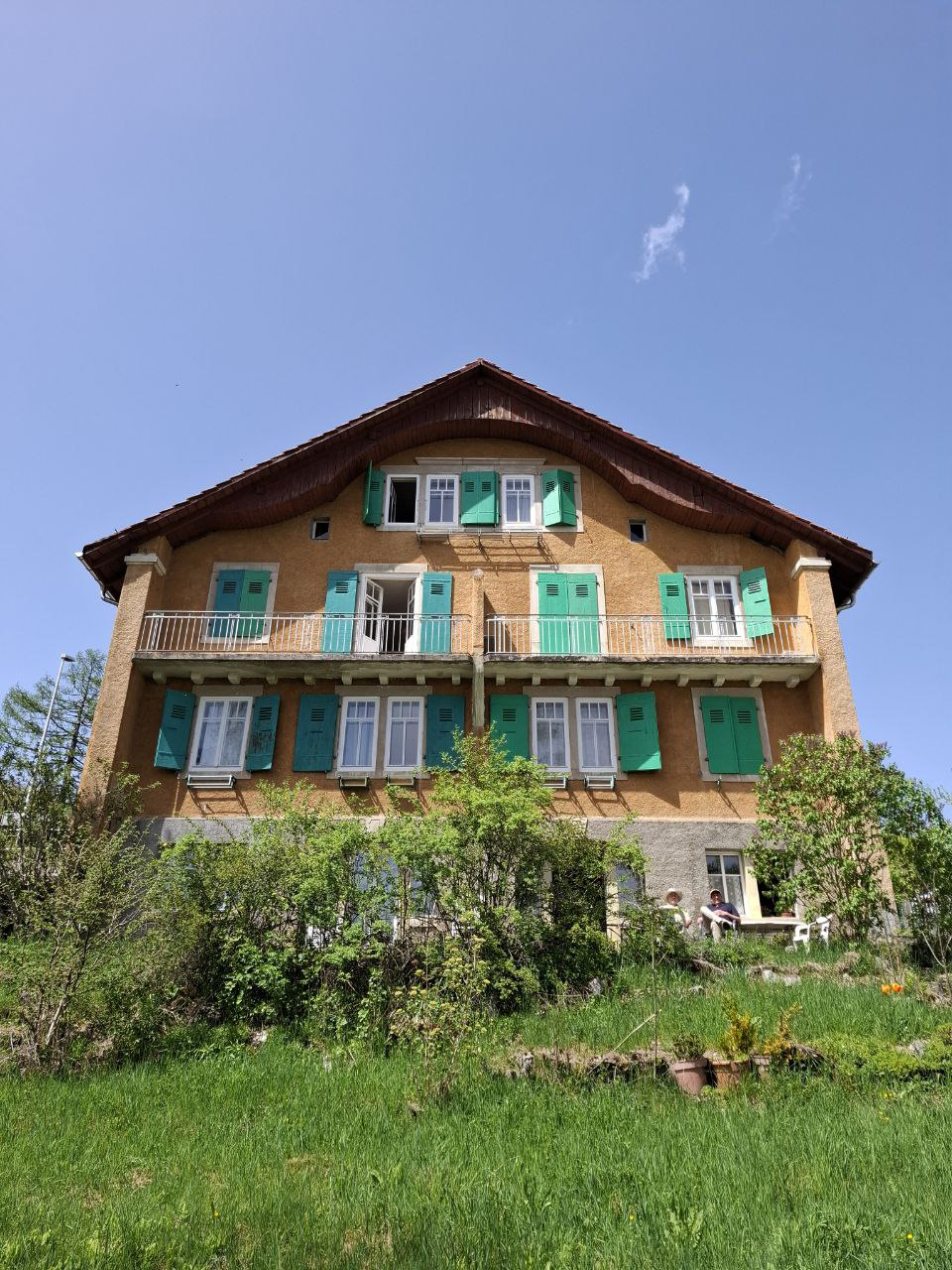
Swiss Esperanto-House of La Chaux-de-Fonds, headquarters of Literatura Foiro.

== Editors-in-chief ==
- Giorgio Silfer, 1970–1980
- Perla Martinelli, 1980–1995
- Ljubomir Trifonĉovski, 1996–2013
- Carlo Minnaja, 2014
- Zlatoje Martinov, 2015–2018
- Perla Martinelli, 2019–2025
- Perla Martinelli and Alessio Giordano, 2026-today
