= Curvilinear principle =

Concept in sociolinguistics

In sociolinguistics, the curvilinear principle states that there is a tendency for linguistic change from below to originate from members of the central classes in a speech community's socioeconomic hierarchy, rather than from the outermost or exterior classes.

== Overview ==
Graph demonstrating the curvilinear principle, showing that the frequency of use is highest in the interior classes and lowest in the exterior classes.

First proposed by William Labov, the curvilinear principle departs from traditional nineteenth century notions that language change generally originates in the highest or lowest classes of society. Instead, it states that variant forms leading to language change are typically introduced and motivated by the intermediate groups—the upper-working class and lower-middle class.

The principle can be seen as one response to an important question in sociolinguistics known as the embedding problem, a problem "concerned with determining regular patterns in both the linguistic and the extra-linguistic context of change." In other words, the embedding problem seeks to identify other changes or factors that have a non-coincidental relationship with the actual linguistic change. The curvilinear principle identifies such a non-trivial factor by proposing that a speaker's class can indicate the degree to which he or she motivates linguistic change.

The principle's name refers to the curvilinear correlation that results from plotting the variation of a linguistic variable with respect to the class of the speakers. Because the lowest and highest classes generally tend to use newly emerging forms less frequently than central classes, data points representing variable usage resemble a concave curve when connected on a graph.

== Studies ==
=== Philadelphia study ===
In the Philadelphia study, William Labov examined a series of linguistic variables in various stages of speech integration in order to evaluate whether the interior classes were, in fact, the innovators of linguistic change. In order to determine each speaker's social position within the community, Labov created a socioeconomic status index based on education and occupation, each ranked on levels from 0 to 6, where 6 was the highest level of education or occupation. He studied a series of "new and vigorous" vowel changes, including the fronting and raising of (aw) and (ey) and the centralization of (ay). The research found that members of the upper working class and lower middle class used these variables more frequently than members of either the lower or upper class. This corroborated his curvilinear hypothesis because the middle classes were leading the use of these "new and vigorous" linguistic changes.

=== Norwich ===
In his study of Norwich, England, Peter Trudgill examined different cases of linguistic variation and whether or not class could be related to realizations of certain linguistic variables. One of the observed variables was the (RP) quality of vowels in words like top, hot, and dog. To determine a subject's class, Trudgill calculated a score for each subject based on six parameters: subject's occupation, father's occupation, income, education, locality, and housing. Trudgill found that middle-class women were introducing the RP vowels in Norwich; working-class men were also introducing variation by borrowing a similar vowel associated with working-class speech from a nearby area. The distribution of linguistic variation in Trudgill's study thus abides by the curvilinear principle because members of the central classes led the change.

=== Lower East Side ===
In 1966, Labov published a study on linguistic variation on the Lower East Side neighborhood of New York City. In the study, he approximated each subject's class with score that factored in his or her occupation, income, and education. Using these scores, Labov then grouped the subjects into 5 categories defined by sociologist Joseph Kahl: lower class, working class, lower middle class, upper middle class, and upper class (though Labov noted no subjects were considered upper class and that the presence of any upper-class people living on the Lower East Side would be unexpected).

One variable considered was (oh), the mid-back rounded vowel present in caught, talk, and dog. Labov found that members of the working class and lower middle class—the central socioeconomic classes of the Lower East Side—used higher vowels for (oh) than did either the lower class or the middle class subjects. Labov recognized this as a linguistic change in progress, driven by the central class in accordance with the curvilinear principle.
