= Finvenkismo =

Pursuing worldwide adoption of Esperanto

Finvenkismo (Esperanto pronunciation: [finvenˈkismo], lit. 'final-victory-ism') is an ideology of pursuing the worldwide adoption of Esperanto as a lingua franca, prioritising this over other current goals of the Esperanto movement.

The name is derived from the concept of an eventual "final victory" for Esperanto, denoting the moment when it will be used as the predominant international auxiliary language. A finvenkisto is thus someone who hopes for or works towards this "final victory" of Esperanto. According to some finvenkists, this "final victory" of Esperanto may help eradicate war, chauvinism, and cultural oppression. The exact nature of this adoption (e.g., individual vs state adoption), and what would constitute a "final victory" is often left unspecified.

== Origin ==
L. L. Zamenhof created Esperanto with the goal of widespread use as a second language for international communication. In the early days of the Esperanto movement, essentially all Esperantists maintained an idealized hope of widespread future adoption; however, as the Esperanto community grew, so did the diversity of ideologies among Esperantists, some of whom began to challenge the merits of preserving such an aspirational goal.

== Possible ways to achieve ==
During the 1910 World Esperanto Congress, Zamenhof highlighted two ways that widespread adoption could be achieved: through individual action (change from below, e.g., self-directed study of Esperanto) around the world, or by government action (change from above) permitting or requiring Esperanto literacy to be taught in schools:

The goal we're working for can be reached in two ways: either by the work of private individuals, i.e., of the popular masses, or by government decrees. Most likely it will be reached the former way because, in matters like ours, the governments ordinarily come with their endorsements and help only when all is ready.

— Speech by L. L. Zamenhof before the 1910 World Esperanto Congress

Among Esperantists, as Esperanto matured, the two ways began to be called desubismo ("from below -ism") and desuprismo ("from above -ism"), respectively.

== Raŭmismo and Civitanismo ==
Since 1980, finvenkismo encountered criticism by so-called raŭmistoj. This ideological current interprets the Esperanto community as a language diaspora in its own right, whose members should not concentrate on the propagation of the language, but rather on its cultivation. The term Raŭmismo is named for the Manifesto of Rauma, signed by many participants of the International Youth Congress in the Finnish town Rauma in 1980.

Soon the word Raŭmismo acquired two different meanings: According to some, a Raŭmist is just someone who uses Esperanto without propagating it. Others follow Raŭmismo, an ideology that considers the Esperanto community a self-selected linguistic minority and supports attempts to get a state-like representation for this minority. Raŭmismo is now often called Civitanismo, because it is the official ideology of the Esperanta Civito (Esperanto Citizens' Community), an organisation which attempts to be such a state-like representation of the Esperanto diaspora. The Raŭmismo (Civitanismo) ideology, representing a small proportion of Esperantists, is perceived as spending more energy on criticising the finvenkist movement than on cultivating Esperanto, and thus has become somewhat isolated within the Esperanto community.

=== Manifesto of Prague ===
In response to the criticisms from Raŭmists, the Esperanto movement produced the Prague Manifesto (Esperanto: Praga Manifesto), which establishes a set of seven widely shared principles of the Esperanto movement. It was drafted at the 1996 World Esperanto Congress in Prague by Mark Fettes and others attending the congress. The document emphasizes democratic communication, language rights, preservation of language diversity, and effective language education.
