= Dejan Popović =

Serbian professor of law

Dejan Popović (born 1950 in Belgrade) is a Serbian professor of law and the former rector of Belgrade University between 2004 and 2006. In 2008 he was appointed Ambassador of Serbia to the United Kingdom.

Popović graduated from the University of Belgrade's Law School in 1973. He obtained his master's degree in 1976 and PhD in 1980. Since 1991 he has been a professor of law, teaching public finances and finance law.

He has written 13 books and numerous academic articles.

In the Government of Serbia (2001-2004) he was the Deputy Minister of Finance. He is not a member of any political party.

Academic offices
| Preceded by Marija Bogdanović | Rector of the University of Belgrade; 2004–2006 | Succeeded by Branko Kovačević |
