= Nataša Atanasković =

Serbian painter, conservator-restorer, writer

Nataša Atanasković (Serbian-Cyrillic: Наташа Атанасковић; born 1972 in Belgrade, Yugoslavia) is a Serbian painter, conservator-restorer and writer.

== Biography ==
Atanasković studied mural painting (frescos, icons) at the academy for art and conservation of the Serbian Orthodox Church. She has participated in religious-artistic designing of several Orthodox churches in Serbia and Republika Srpska for recent decades. In 1997, she was staff of conservator team, which had renovated the murals of St. Michael's Cathedral, supported by Republic Institute for the Protection of Monuments of Cultural Heritage. She participated with some of her works at the exhibition Orthodox Symphony 1997 in the Residence of Princess Ljubica, and an exhibition of her portraits of 20th-century painters entitled Modern Art - Questions and Answers was shown in the Phoenix Gallery Belgrade (Feniks Galerija) in 2012.

In addition to her work as visual artist, she has written four novels since 2010, her debut work Horse, Pipe and Red Flower (title is an allusion to the same-named picture by Joan Miró) received the Mali Nemo Award. The mother of two daughters lives in Belgrade.

== Awards ==
- Mali Nemo Award

== Works ==
- Konj, lula i crveni cvet (Horse, Pipe and Red Flower), novel, Mali Nemo, Pančevo 2010, ISBN 978-86-7972-056-6.
- Brod duhova i Princeza blogova (Ghost ship and princess of blogs), Presing, Mladenovac 2013, ISBN 978-86-6341-019-0.
- Božansko poreklo (Divine origin), novel, poems and short stories, Presing, Mladenovac 2015, ISBN 978-86-6341-074-9.
- Libreto gospođe Korvusamenti (Libretto of Madam Korvusamenti), Gothic novel, Otvorena knjiga, Belgrade 2017, ISBN 978-86-7674-272-1.
