= Change from above =

Type of linguistic change

In linguistics, change from above refers to conscious change to a language. That is, speakers are generally aware of the linguistic change and use it to sound more dominant, as a result of social pressure. It stands in contrast to change from below.

Change from above usually enters the speech of educated people, not the vernacular dialects. This change usually begins with speakers in higher social classes and diffuses down into the lower classes. Upper classes use these new linguistic forms to differentiate themselves from the lower classes, while lower classes use these forms to sound more educated and similar to the upper class. However, the concepts of change from above and below refer to consciousness and not social class.

== Diffusion ==
Lexical diffusion is a major kind of change. It includes changes of words, sounds, mergers, and reassignment of words to different categories. Recipients of diffusion pick up these changes over a lifetime. Women often lead in these kinds of variation and in change from above in general. This is also the case for change from below.

== See also ==
- Desuprismo in Esperanto finvenkism
