= Change from below =

Type of linguistic change

Change from below is linguistic change that occurs from below the level of consciousness. It is language change that occurs from social, cognitive, or physiological pressures from within the system. This is in opposition to change from above, wherein language change is a result of elements imported from other systems.

Change from below first enters the language from below the level of consciousness; that is, speakers are generally unaware of the linguistic change. These linguistic changes enter language primarily through the vernacular and spread throughout the community without speakers' conscious awareness. Since change from below is initially non-salient, the changing features are not marked characteristics and are difficult for speakers or linguists to perceive. As the changes occur, they will ultimately become stable changes that are stigmatized.

== Curvilinear principle ==
New linguistic changes that enter the language from below are most commonly used by the interior socioeconomic classes, as displayed by William Labov's curvilinear principle. Change from below is seen in Labov's Philadelphia study, where a series of new vowel changes was most often used by the interior classes. Age and gender similarly affect the way changes occur, where younger or female individuals are more likely to exhibit the change than older or male individuals in the community. However, gender, age, and social class act independently in transmission.

== The roles of women and conformity ==
Change from below challenges societal norms; women (especially upper working class women, and those who are socially entrenched and involved in their community) lead this linguistic change. However, forms that have overt prestige are more prized by these groups, so when changes from below rise to the level of awareness, they are frequently stigmatized and rejected by the very people using them.

Change from below typically begins in informal speech. Often, those utilizing the changing forms are young speakers using the language as a form of resistance to authority. The changes made by individuals such as these, who are upwardly mobile and intentionally nonconformist, then diffuse into the speech of broader groups as described by Bill Labov’s Constructive Nonconformity Principle.

== Three phases of change ==
=== Transmission ===
The first phase of change from below is the acquisition of language by children. Typically, children learn the patterns of female caretakers.

=== Incrementation ===
The second phase of change from below is the advancement of informal changes by young individuals.

=== Stabilization ===
The third phase of change from below sees the individual’s speech shift towards more standard forms, and the change become socioeconomically diffused and stigmatized.

== See also ==
- Desubismo in Esperanto finvenkism
