= István Nemere =

Hungarian novelist (1944–2024)

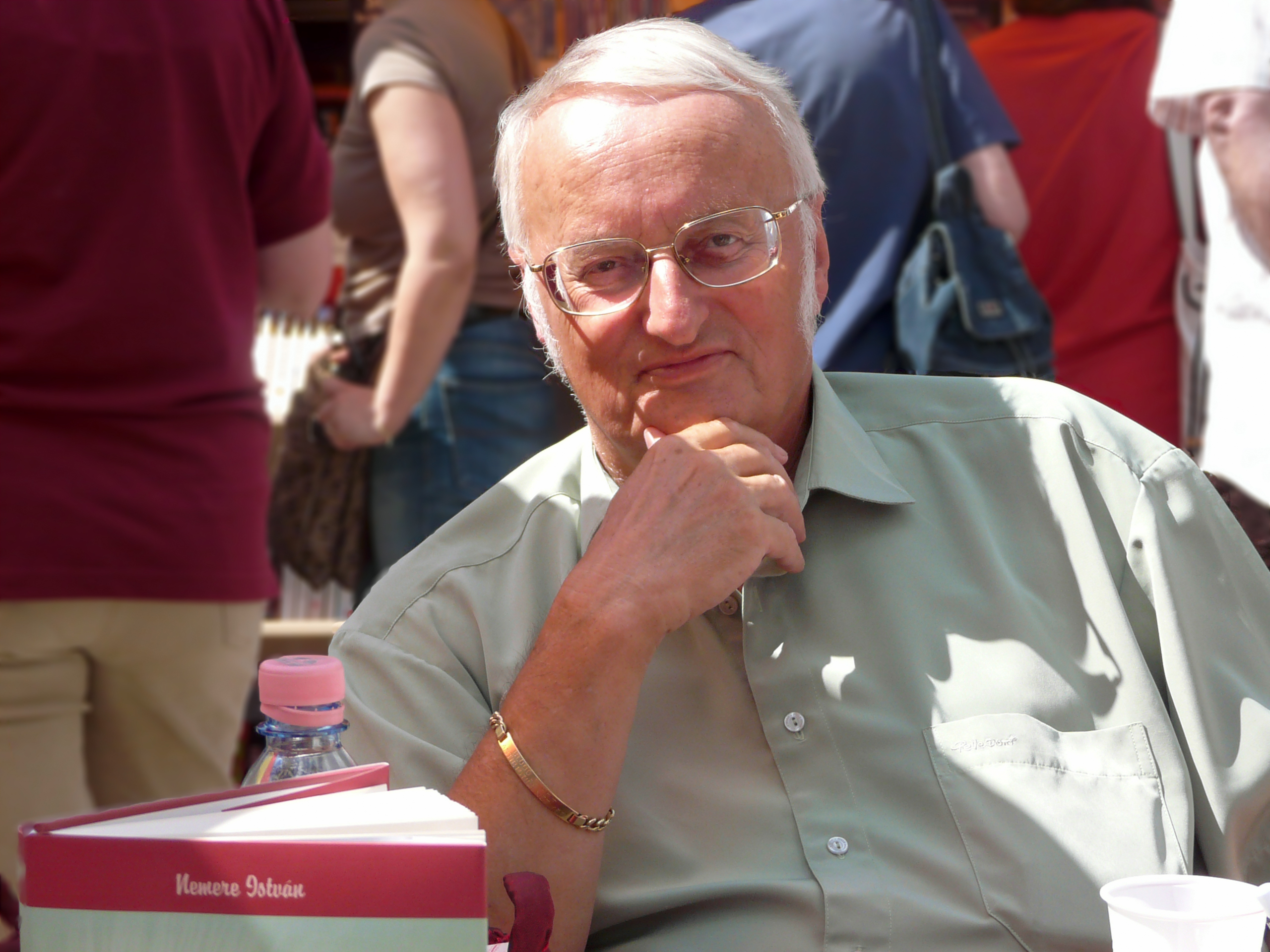
- Nemere in 2010
- Born: 8 November 1944; Pécs, Hungary
- Died: 15 November 2024 (aged 80)
- Occupations: Writer; Esperantist; Translator

István Nemere (8 November 1944 – 15 November 2024) was a Hungarian novelist, Esperantist, and translator. He wrote 744 published books up to November 2020, mostly in Hungarian, over twenty novels in Esperanto. He has been a notable figure in the world of Hungarian science fiction with as many as 60 novels and several stories.

Nemere alleged that the film Demolition Man plagiarized one of his novels.

== Background ==
Nemere was born in Pécs, Hungary on 8 November 1944. He was twice elected as the president of the PEN International in the 1990s; but he was not a member of the Hungarian Writers' Union.

Nemere died on 15 November 2024, at the age of 80.

== Writing ==
His fame is due to his sci-fi and paranormal books but he wrote in other genres too. His works have been translated into Esperanto and Persian amongst others.

His first book was published in 1974. According to him he's the record holder of the most published books (800) – beating Barbara Cartland.

Nemere's 1983 Esperanto novel Sur Kampo Granita, originally written in Esperanto was included by Scottish poet William Auld in the Baza legolisto, a curated canon of essential works in the language.

== Selected works ==
- The Whip of the Cosmos (A kozmosz korbácsa)
- Steel Shark (Acélcápa)
- Action Neutron (Neutron-akció)
- On The Granite Field (Sur kampo granita)
