= Milan Orlić =

Serbian poet, writer and publisher (born 1962)

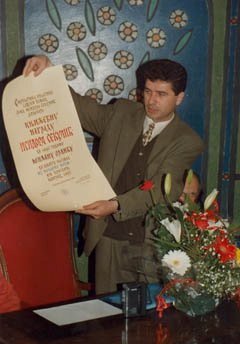
- Born: 1962 (age 63–64); Pančevo, SR Serbia, SFR Yugoslavia

Milan Orlić (Serbian-Cyrillic: Милан Орлић; born 15 November 1962 in Pančevo) is a Serbian poet, writer and publisher.

== Biography ==
Milan Orlić began studying at the Philosophical Faculty in Belgrade and graduated with master's degree (Magister). The author is founder and proprietor of the publishing house Mali Nemo which runs successfully since 1994. The publishing assortment includes publications on literary theory, humanities and cultural history as well as prose by contemporary authors. He is editor-in-chief of the literary-editorial-staff of Mali Nemo and editor of the literary magazine Sveske (Serbian: Notebooks). Many of his essays and reviews of the last decades have been published in several other literary and cultural magazines such as Letopis Matice srpske (Chronicle of Serbian Matica), Književna istorija (Literary history), Gradina (South Slavic: Garden), Polja (Fields), Art032 and Koraci (Steps). The poet is laureate of the renowned literary prizes Isidora Sekulić Award (1995), Branko Miljković Award (1998) and the Milan Rakić Award (2006).

He gave guest lectures on contemporary Serbian literature at the departments of Slavic Studies of the universities in Paris, Prague, Brno, Kraków, Poznan, Wrocław, Gdańsk, Opole and Melbourne. He was President of Jury of the Isidora Sekulić Award from 2001 to 2005. For many years, he participates in international academic conferences and symposia with thematic focus on Serbian literature and presents his publishing house at book fairs (Belgrade Book Fair) and in bookstores. In 2004, Orlić's publishing house was the only representative from Vojvodina at the Frankfurt Book Fair. The publisher initiated a literary prize (Nagrada Mali Nemo) for the young generation of writers of Serbia which was presented annually during the Belgrade Book Fair from 2007 to 2013. The award-winning authors were Aleksandar Marčićev, Aleksandar Novaković, Violeta Ivković, Nataša Atanasković, Radoš Kosović, Čedomir Ljubičić and Nenad Pavlović. Orlić was one of the young editors of the publication of Pančevo's 14th Rukopisi (Manuscripts) Festival of 1989. In the years 2006, 2008 and 2016, selections of his poems have been published in anthologies of Serbian poetry in Romanian, Polish and English translation. In 2001 and 2013, some of his poems have been published in the International Poetry Review of the University of North Carolina and The Literary Review in English translation. In 2013, two of his poetic works have been published in French edition. In 2015, Milan Orlić obtained the doctorate as doctor of philosophy at the Faculty of Arts of the Australian Monash University and enriched his respectable career. He is current member of the Association of Writers of Serbia. The artist lives in his native place.

== Bibliography (selection) ==
- O ne/stvarnom: pričoroman (About the Un/real: Novella), Književna omladina Srbije, Belgrade 1987, ISBN 86-7343-012-7.
- Momo u polarnoj noći: bajka za odrasle (Momo in the Polar Night: A Fairytale for Adults), Prosveta, Belgrade 1992, ISBN 86-07-00671-1.
- Iz polarne noći (From the Polar Night), Prosveta, Belgrade 1995, ISBN 86-07-00911-7, second edition in 1996, poetry.
- Zapisi iz polarne noći (Notes From the Polar Night), Prosveta, Belgrade 1997, ISBN 86-07-00000-4, essays.
- Bruj milenija (Hum of Millennium), Prosveta, Belgrade 1998, second edition in 2000.
- Grad, pre nego što usnim (The City, Before I Fall Asleep), Mali Nemo, Pančevo 2005, ISBN 86-83453-63-4, poetry.
- Žudnja za celinom (Longing for Wholeness), Mali Nemo, Pančevo 2009, ISBN 978-86-7972-043-6, poetry.
- Ardent désir d'unité; La ville, avant que je m'endorme (Longing for Wholeness; The City, Before I Fall Asleep), translated by Harita Wibrands, Liljana Huibner-Fuzellier, Raymond Fuzellier and Nina Živančević, L'Harmattan, Paris 2013, ISBN 978-2-343-01928-4.
- Andrić, Crnjanski, Pekić: pripovedne strukture srpskog (post)modernističkog romana: dekonstrukcija pripovednog subjekta i rekonstrukcija figure pripovedača (Andrić, Crnjanski, Pekić: narrative structures of the Serbian (post) modernist novel: the deconstruction of the narrative subject and the reconstruction of the narrator figure), Mali Nemo, Pančevo 2017, ISBN 978-86-7972-107-5, literary theory and science.
